= Cottonwood Lake (British Columbia) =

Lake in British Columbia, Canada

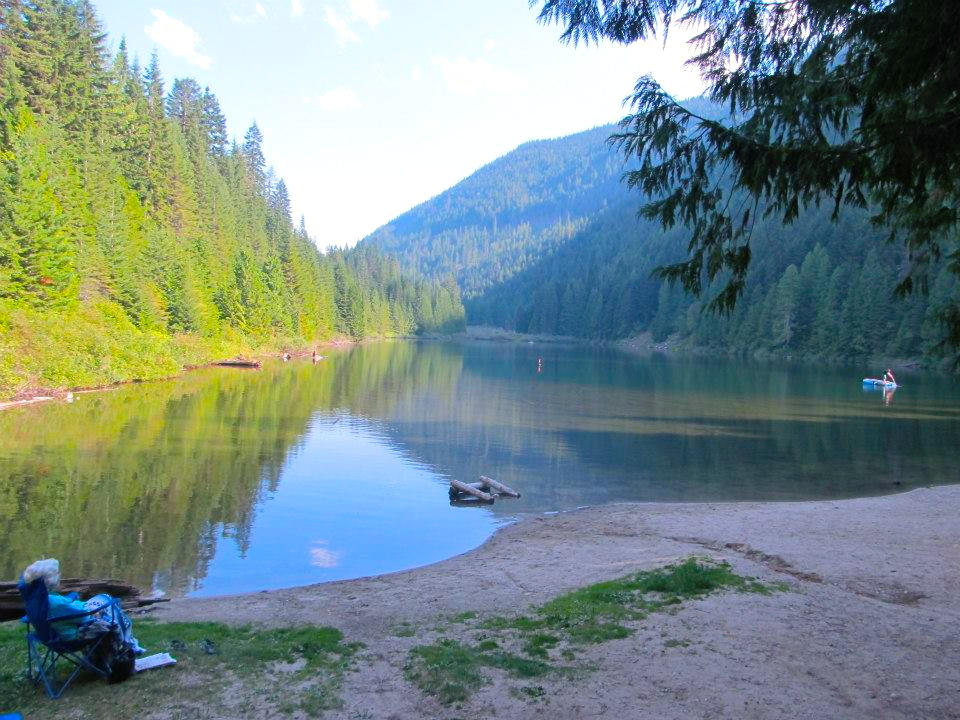
- Cottonwood Lake south of Nelson

- Location within British Columbia
- Interactive map of Cottonwood Lake
- Location: Central Kootenay, British Columbia
- Coordinates: 49°25′43″N 117°15′11″W
- Type: Lake
- Part of: Cottonwood Lake Regional Park
- Primary inflows: Cottonwood Creek
- Basin countries: Canada
- Managing agency: Regional District of Central Kootenay
- Surface area: 6.5 ha (16 acres)
- Average depth: 7–8 m (23–26 ft)
- Max. depth: 15 m (49 ft)
- Shore length^{1}: 1.26 km (1 mi)
- Surface elevation: 711 m (2,333 ft)
- Settlements: Nelson, British Columbia
- References: "Cottonwood Lake (British Columbia)". BC Geographical Names. Government of British Columbia – B.C. Geographical Names Office (BCGNO).
- ^{1} Shore length is not a well-defined measure.

Cottonwood Lake is a lake in the Selkirk Mountains in the West Kootenay region of the Regional District of Central Kootenay in British Columbia, Canada.

The lake is the fed by Cottonwood Creek, which has its source just south of the lake near Apex Summit at the Highway 6 turnoff for Whitewater Ski Resort. The headwaters of the Salmo River are only a few metres away from that of Cottonwood Creek, which flows to the south to the Pend d’Oreille River.

The lake is the central feature of Cottonwood Lake Regional Park, owned by the Regional District of Central Kootenay (RDCK). The park is 22.4 hectares (55 acres) and can be accessed by Highway 6 just south of Nelson. Amenities at the park include areas for public swimming, a boat launch, washrooms, picnic tables, walking trails and access to cross country ski trails in the winter. The Great Northern Rail Trail runs through the park on its way from Nelson to Salmo.

Cottonwood Creek exits Cottonwood Lake at the north end of the lake and flows north into the city of Nelson, where it discharges into Kootenay Lake.

== Park expansion ==
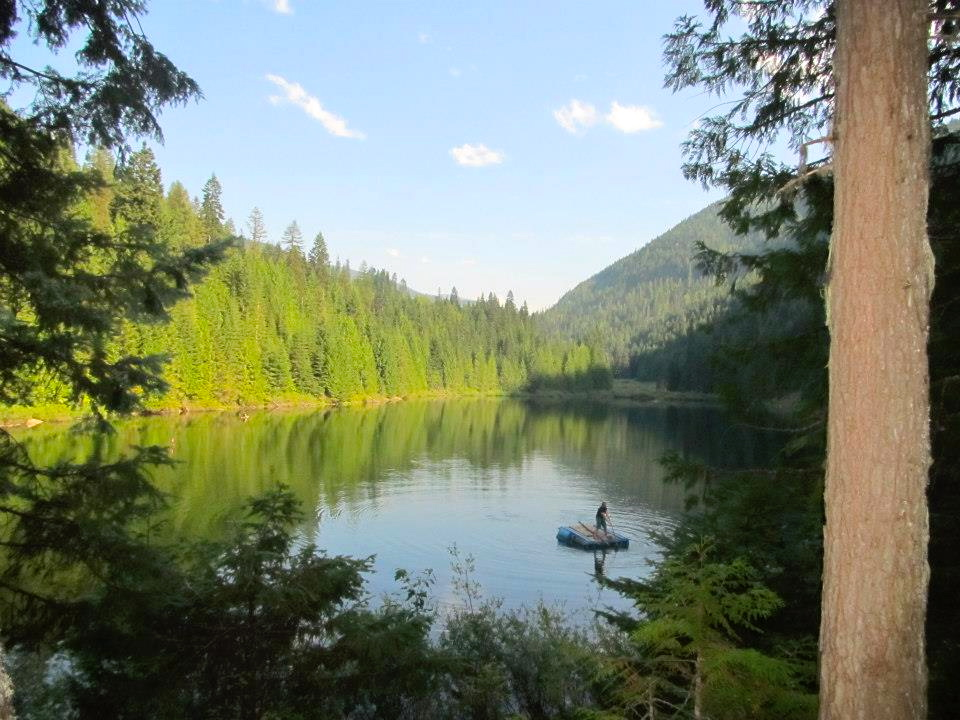
Cottonwood Lake south of Nelson BC

In early 2018, 21.6 hectares (53 acres) immediately surrounding the park was slated to be logged by its private owner, the Nelson Land Corporation. There was immediate local public outcry over the plans and calls for the local and regional government to intervene. Local residents expressed their opposition to the plans through letter writing campaigns, petitions, and social media.

A public meeting was held in Nelson on December 19, 2018, at which there was testimony from experts, concerns from citizens, and possible alternatives were discussed. The Cottonwood Lake Preservation Society was formed to help with fundraising efforts and encouraged citizens to write to elected officials in the region. Negotiations began with the landowner and the RDCK in July 2018 and concluded with an agreement for the RDCK to purchase the land for C$450,000 ($250,000 of which was provided by a grant from the Columbia Basin Trust).

The land was added to the park which increased its size to the current size of 22.4 hectares (55 acres).

== See also ==
- List of lakes of British Columbia
