= Stewart Creek (British Columbia) =

Tributary of the Salmo River

Coordinates: 49°18′42″N 117°13′43″W

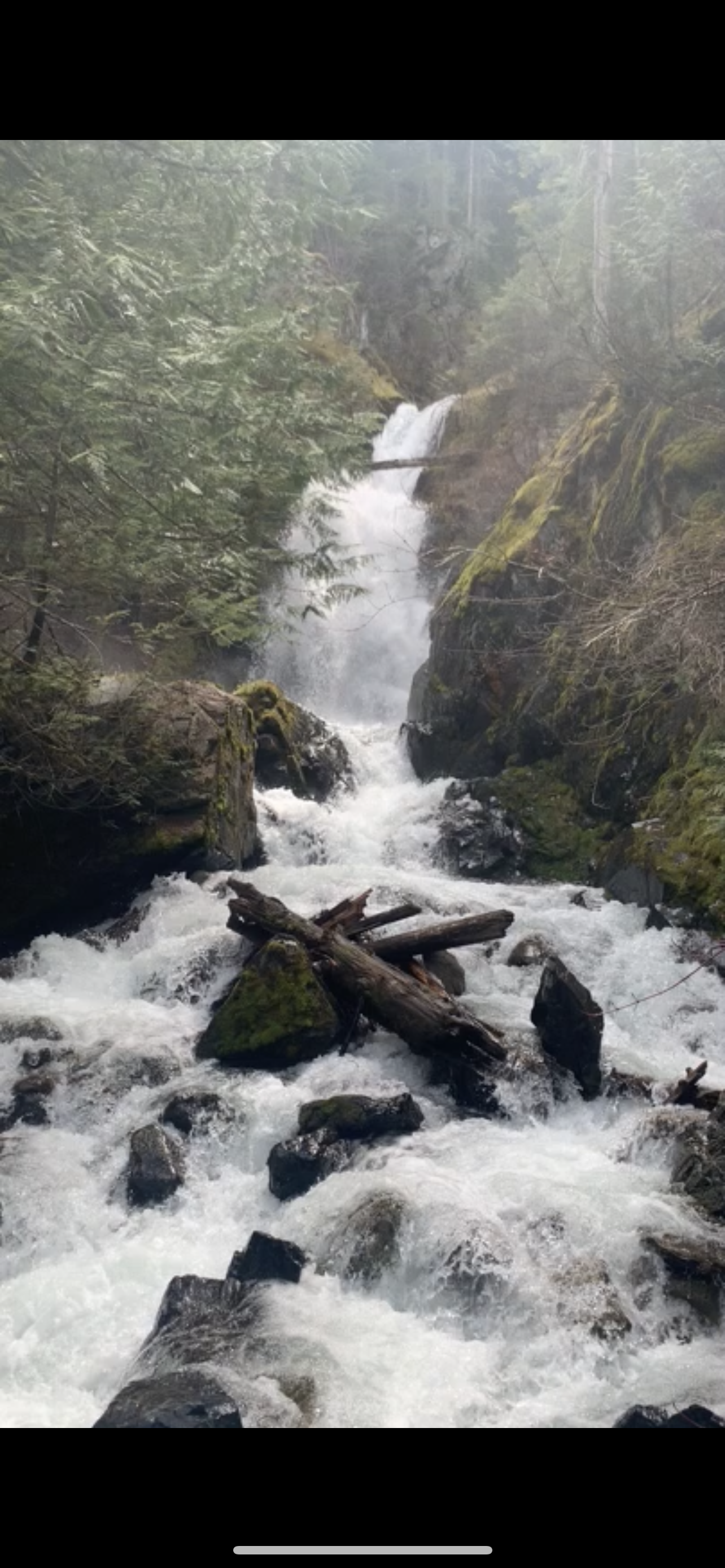
Waterfall at Stewart Creek near Ymir

Stewart Creek is a small creek in the Regional District of Central Kootenay in the West Kootenay region of British Columbia, Canada. The creek is a tributary of the Salmo River and has its source in the Selkirk Mountains close to the town of Ymir. The name was adopted in 1930. Its source is the peaks of Round Mountain, the same source as that of Quartz Creek and is approximately 2 km north of Ymir. There is a rest area featuring a small waterfall with a picnic area on Highway 6 at Stewart Creek.
