= Erie, British Columbia =

Erie
- Location of Erie in British Columbia
- Coordinates: 49°11′00″N 117°20′00″W
- Country: Canada
- Province: British Columbia

Erie is a ghost town located in the West Kootenay region of British Columbia. Erie is located eight miles west of Salmo, southwest of Nelson. The town of Erie was originally known as North Fork. Erie was founded in the 1860s when prospectors discovered gold in a canyon on a stream called North Fork Creek. North Fork Creek is now called Erie Creek. A mineshaft was bored up on the mountain at the Arlington claim and removed ore for several years. Cabins and bunkhouses were built about 1897 on the mountain. The Second Relief claim was formed later and worked too. One miner and hotelier in the area was Marcus Gillam, the grandfather to singer Michelle Phillips.

The Great Northern Railway, working locally as the Nelson and Fort Sheppard Railway, built a line and siding--Erie Siding-- to load the ore at the foot of the mountain. The mines only ran for a dozen years when the majority of mining activity moved to Ymir and Sheep Creek areas. Mining continued sporadically in the years thereafter.

The town of Erie declined and moved into lumbering and homesteading when other towns such as Ymir and Salmo became more metallurgically prominent. Today there is a motel and cafe at the location.
