= Shambhala (music festival) =

Annual music festival in British Columbia, Canada

- Location of Shambhala in British Columbia
- Coordinates: 49.141884°N 117.264357°W
- Country: Canada
- Province: British Columbia
- Region: West Kootenay
- Regional district: Central Kootenay
- Elevation: 670 m (2,200 ft)
- Time zone: UTC-8 (PST)
- Highways: 3; 6
- Waterways: Salmo River

Shambhala Music Festival is an annual music festival in British Columbia, Canada, founded by Jim "Jimmy" Bundschuh. It is held during the last week of July at the Bundschuh family farm; Salmo River Ranch, a 500-acre (2.0 km^{2}) farm in the West Kootenay mountains near Nelson. The festival lasts four days and three nights and offers a mix of music and art in nature.

== History ==
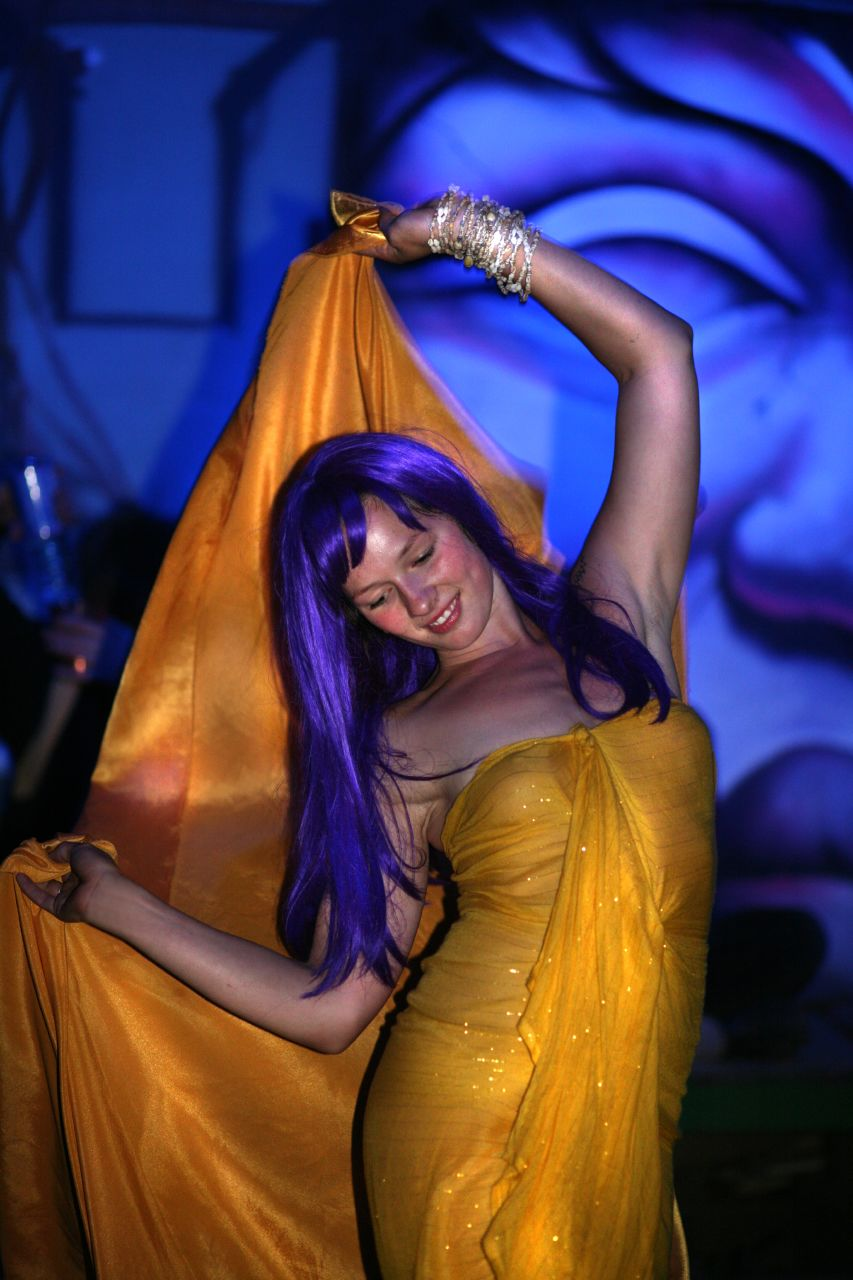
A dancing festival-goer in 2007

Shambhala began in 1998 and has grown to become the largest and one of the longest-running electronic music events in Canada. It is a family-run event and operates without corporate sponsorship. In the summer months, the ranch becomes home to volunteers and event staff who prepare for and operate the festival.

In the summer of 2008, a DVD documenting the festival's ten-year history was released. The film "follows different characters through a year in the life of Shambhala from the perspective of DJs, people in charge, medical volunteers and others."

In 2011 and 2012, Shambhala received awards for Best Large Event at the International Breakspoll Awards.

In 2019, it was crowned Best Music Festival in North America by DJ Mag.

The 2020 and 2021 editions of the festival were cancelled due to the COVID-19 pandemic; the event resumed in 2022. The 2023 edition of Shambhala Music Festival took place from July 21 to 24.

== See also ==
- List of electronic music festivals
