= Barrett Lake (British Columbia) =

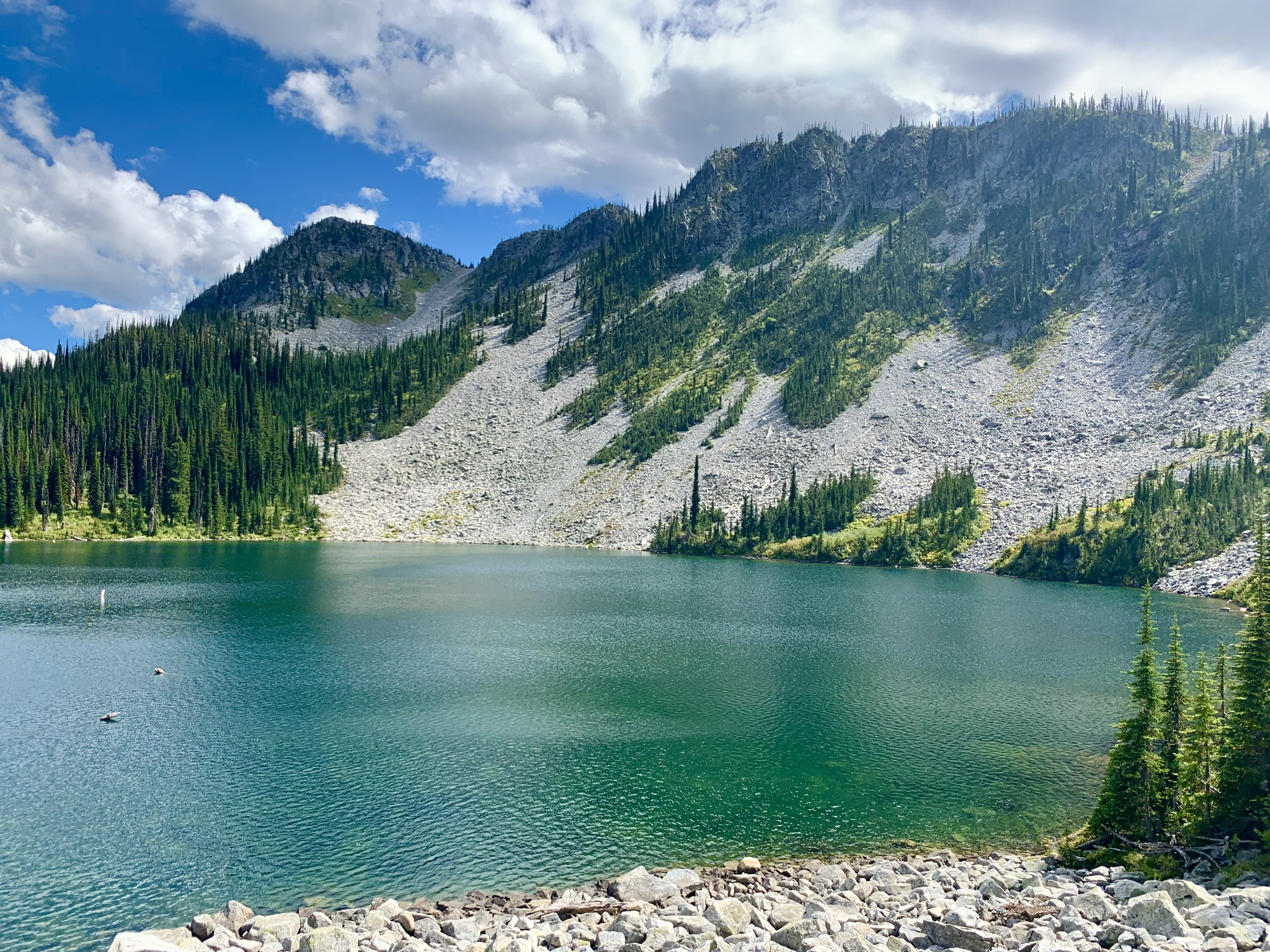
- Interactive map of Barrett Lake
- Location: Selkirk Mountains, West Kootenay, Regional District of Central Kootenay, British Columbia, Canada
- Coordinates: 49°09′N 117°09′W
- Type: Lake
- Primary inflows: Barrett Creek
- Basin countries: Canada

Barrett Lake is a lake in the Selkirk Mountains in the West Kootenay region of the Regional District of Central Kootenay in British Columbia, Canada. The lake is the source of Barrett Creek, a tributary of the Salmo River. The lake is surrounded by a series of mountain peaks including Dominion Mountain, Empire Peak, Commonwealth Mountain and others. There is an emergency cabin maintained by Recreation Sites and Trails BC.

== See also ==
- List of lakes of British Columbia
