= Barrett Creek (British Columbia) =

Coordinates: 49.33318°N 117.23551°W

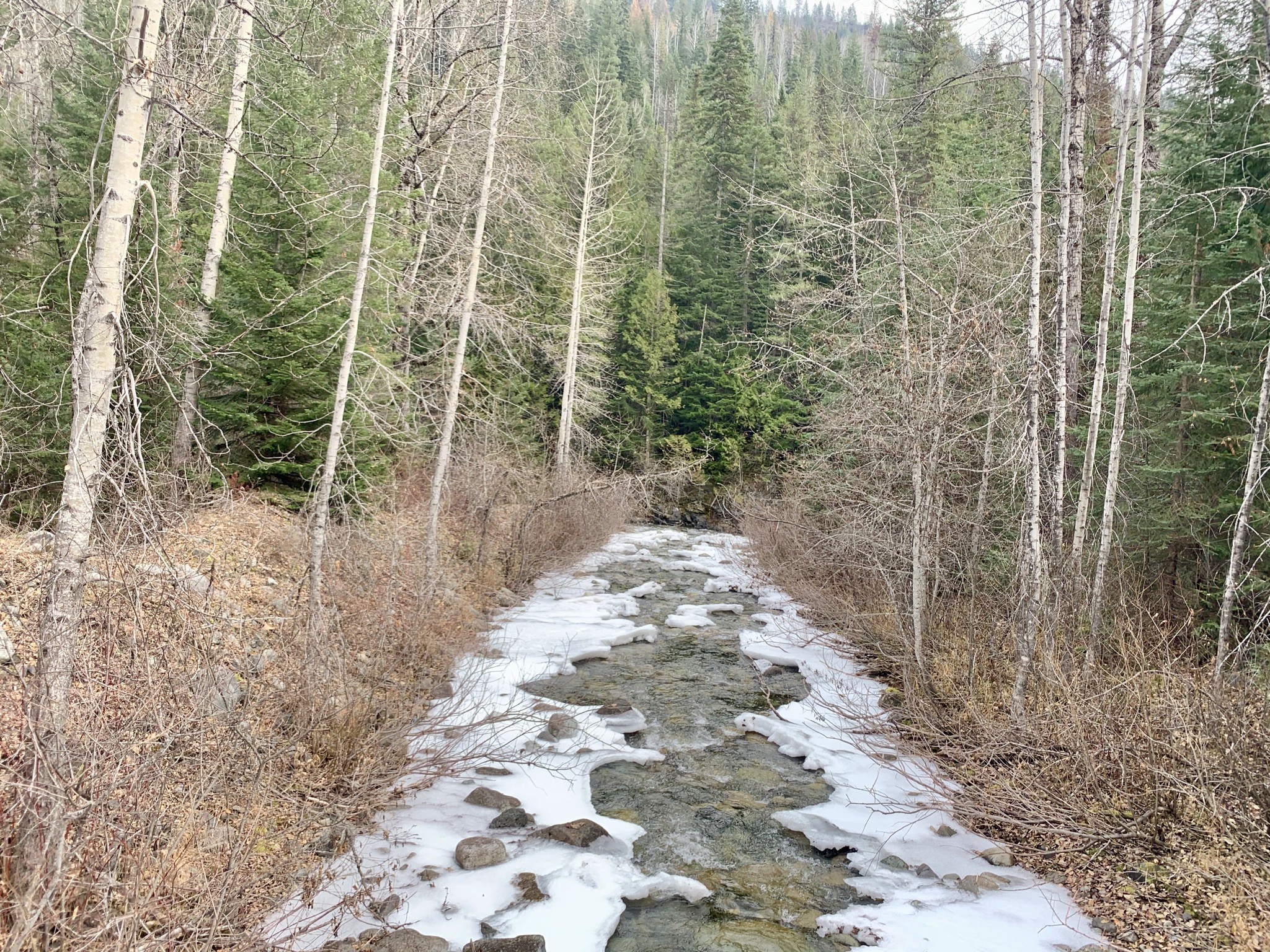
Barrett Creek near its confluence with the Salmo River

Barrett Creek is a creek in the Selkirk Mountains in the West Kootenay region of the Regional District of Central Kootenay in British Columbia, Canada. The creek flows east from Barrett Lake to the Salmo River in the community of Porto Rico a few kilometres north of Ymir. Porto Rico was the site of mines staked in 1896, and some early maps may refer to Barrett creek as Porto Rico creek.
