= Salmo River =

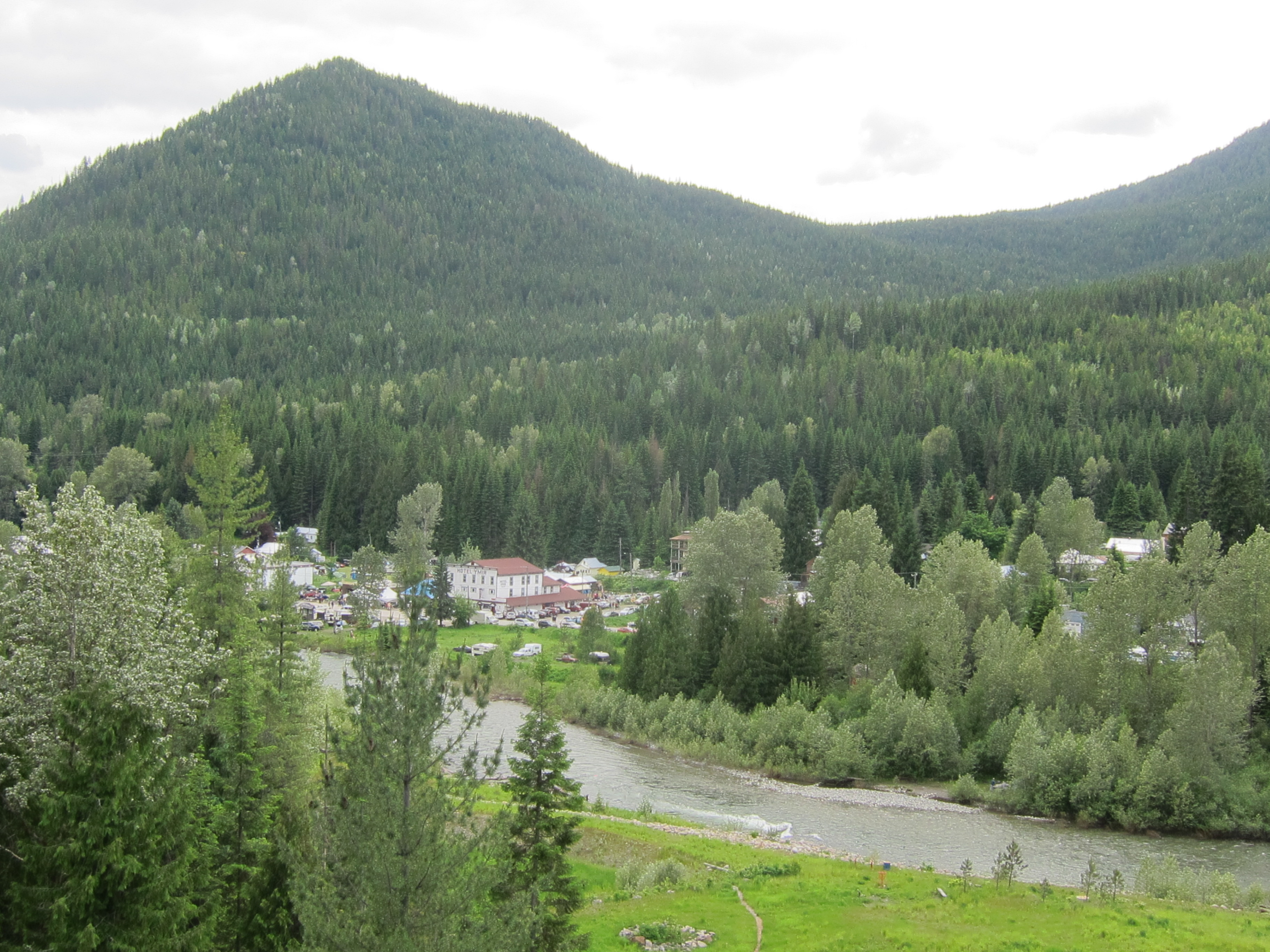
- Salmo River at Ymir, British Columbia

Location
- Country: Canada
- Province: British Columbia
- Region: West Kootenay
- Regional District: Regional District of Central Kootenay

Physical characteristics
- Source: Selkirk Mountains south of Nelson
- Mouth: Pend d’Oreille River
  - coordinates: 49°2′N 117°23′W
- Length: 60 km (37 mi)
- Basin size: 1,300 km^{2} (500 sq mi)
- Discharge
  - location: Near Salmo
  - average: 31.8 m^{3}/s (1,120 cu ft/s)
  - minimum: 1.64 m^{3}/s (58 cu ft/s)
  - maximum: 382 m^{3}/s (13,500 cu ft/s)

The Salmo River is a tributary of the Pend d'Oreille River in the West Kootenay region of the Regional District of Central Kootenay in the Canadian province of British Columbia. The river is 60 km long and its source is 12 km south of Nelson in the Selkirk Mountains. The Salmo River is part of the Columbia River drainage basin, being a tributary of the Pend d'Oreille River, which flows into the Columbia River.

The river's drainage basin is 1,300 square kilometres (500 sq mi) in area. Its mean annual discharge is 32.5 cubic metres per second (1,150 cu ft/s).

== Course ==
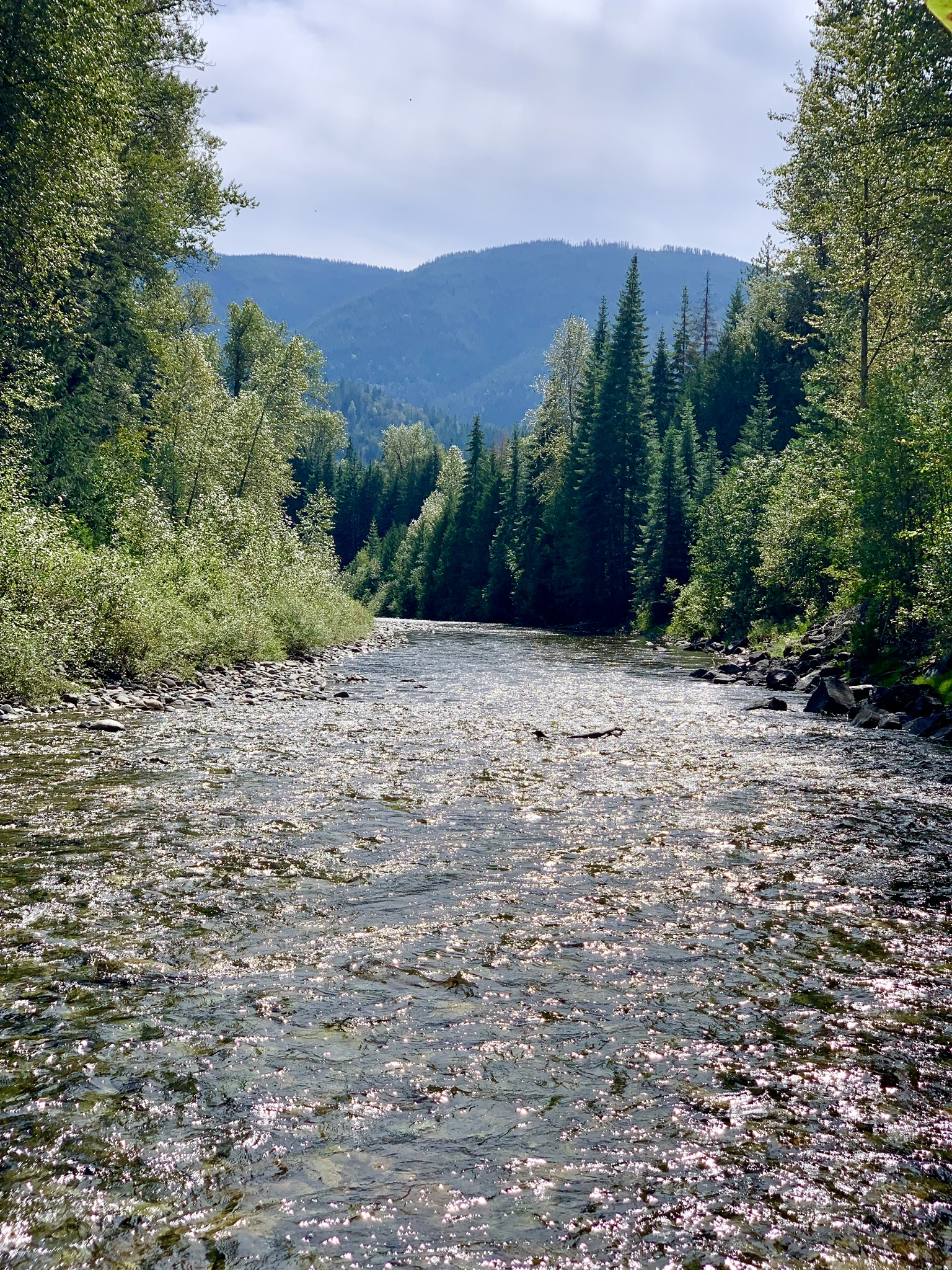
Salmo River in Ymir, British Columbia, looking south.

The Salmo River originates in the Selkirk Mountains south of Nelson. The headwaters are south of Apex summit at the Nelson Nordic Ski Club, just south of Cottonwood Lake and very near the source of Cottonwood Creek. The entire length of the river is 60 km and drains an area of 1,300 square kilometres. Highway 6 parallels the river for the rivers entire length. The Nelson-Salmo Great Northern Trail (Salmo-Troup Rail Trail) also runs alongside the river from its headwaters to the town of Salmo, where the trail diverts west.

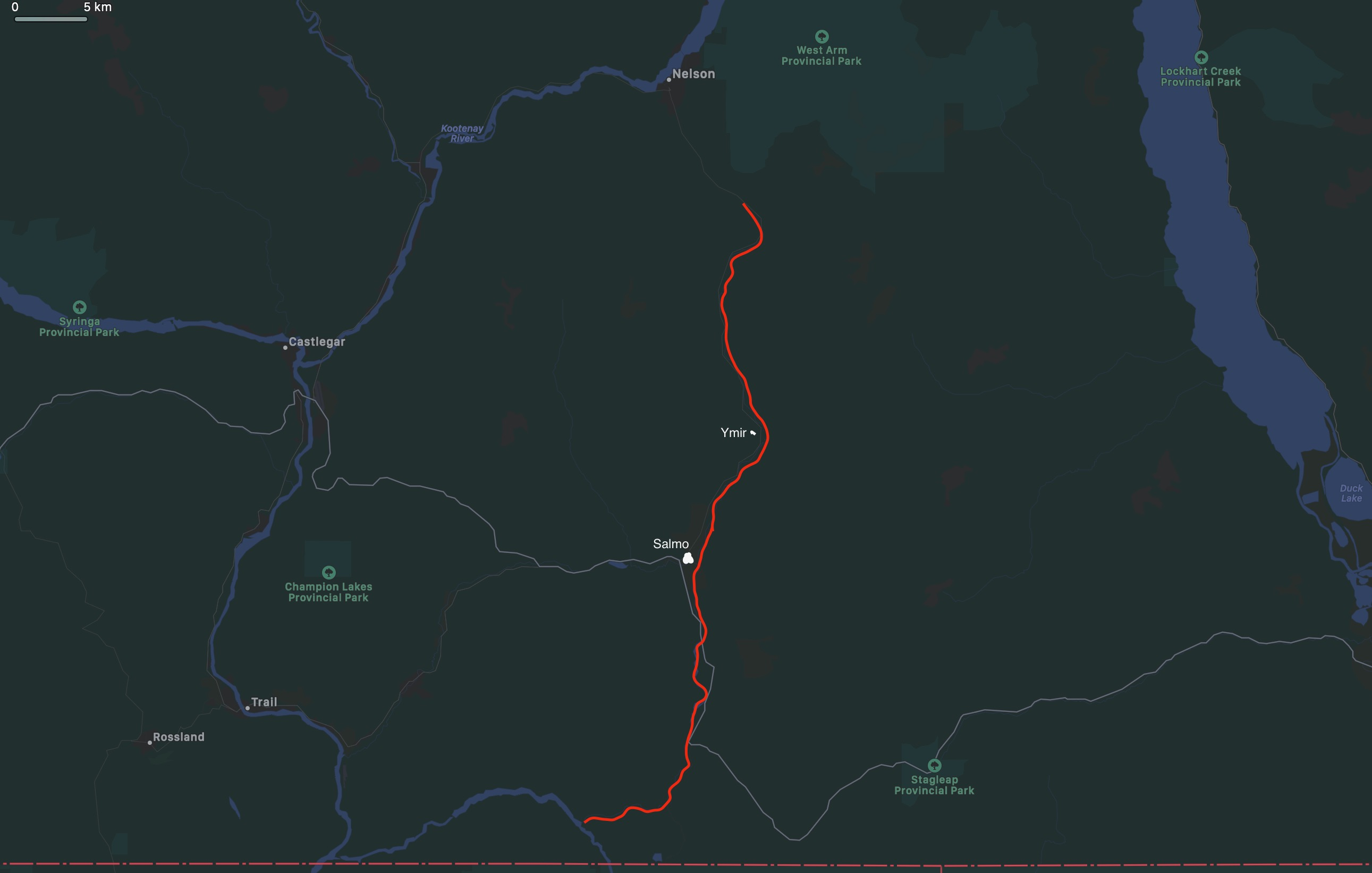
Course of the Salmo River highlighted in red.

It flows south through the rugged mountains and forests of the West Kootenays, being joined by several creeks along its course. Apex Creek, which flows from Ymir Mountain, joins the Salmo river just south of the turnoff from Highway 6 for Whitewater Ski Resort. From there it flows south to the community of Hall, where is it joined by Hall Creek. The river then continues south to the community of Porto Rico, where it is joined by Barrett Creek.

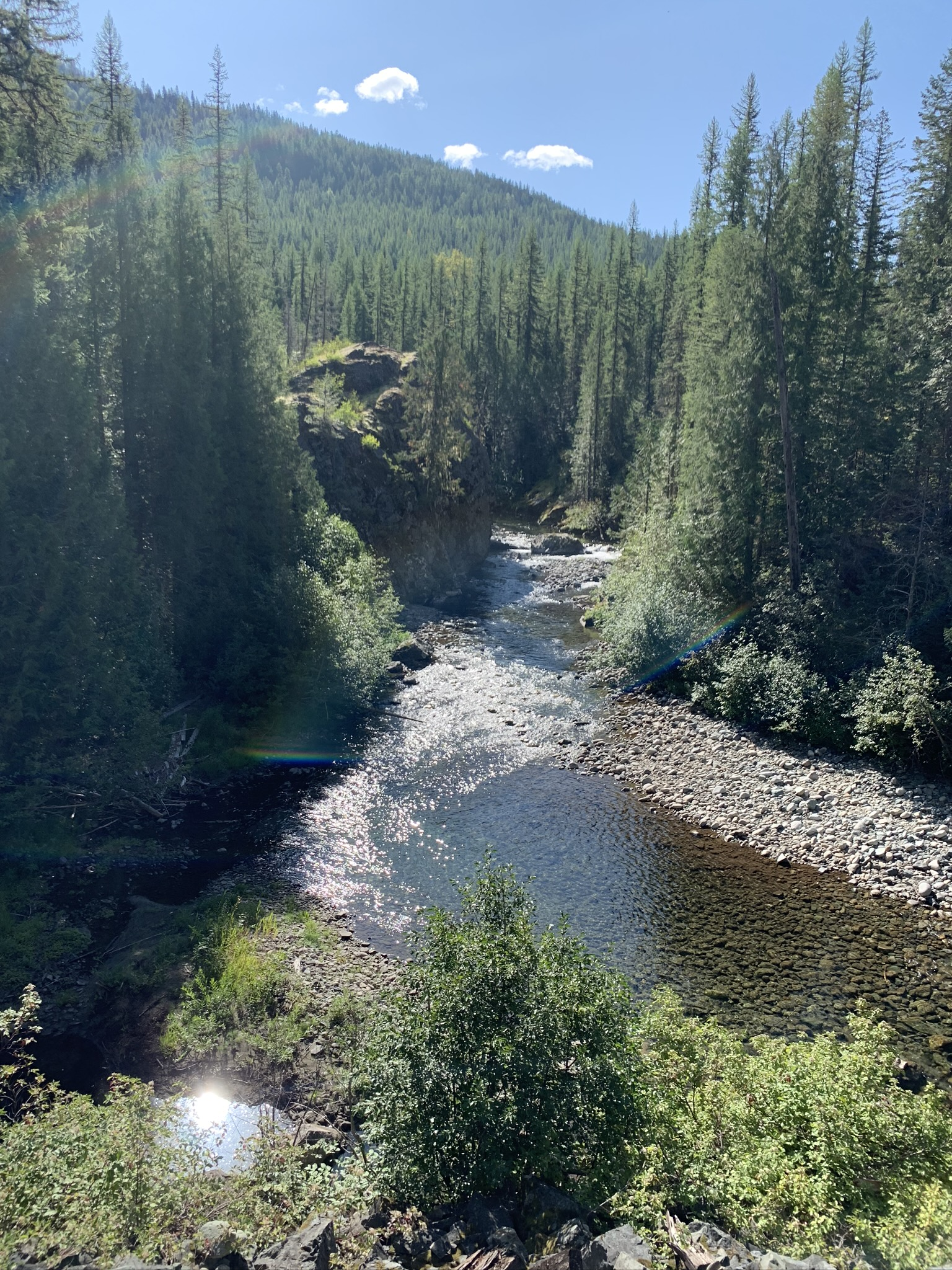
Salmo River at Hall

The river then flows south to the town of Ymir, where it is joined by Stewart Creek, Ymir Creek, Quartz Creek and Oscar Creek. Upon leaving Ymir, the river is joined by Porcupine Creek and Boulder Mill Creek, and Hidden Creek.

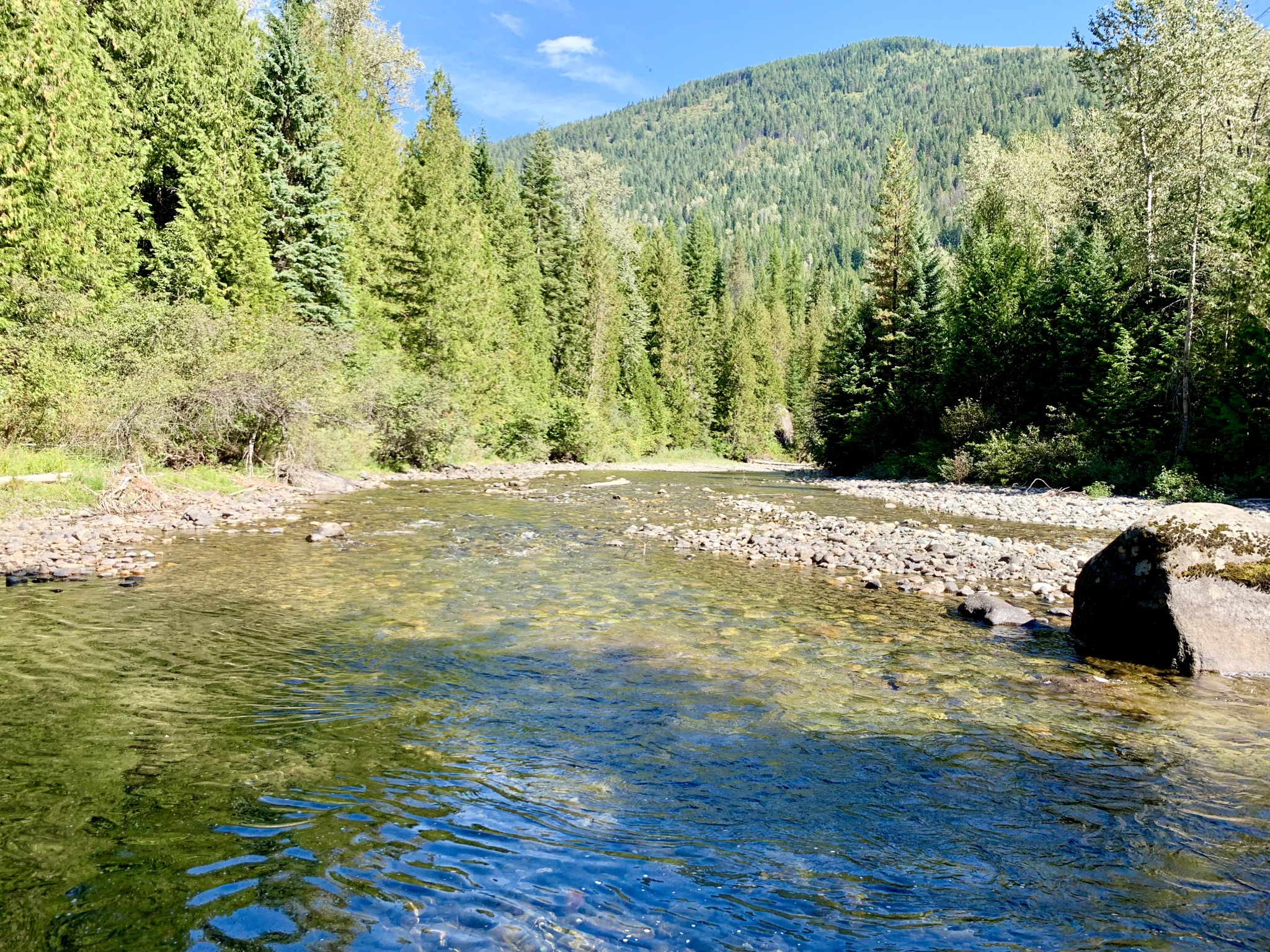
Salmo River near Ymir

The river then reaches the town of Salmo, itself named for the river. In Salmo the river is joined by Erie Creek (historically known as the North Fork of the Salmo), which provides a large portion of the water in the river.

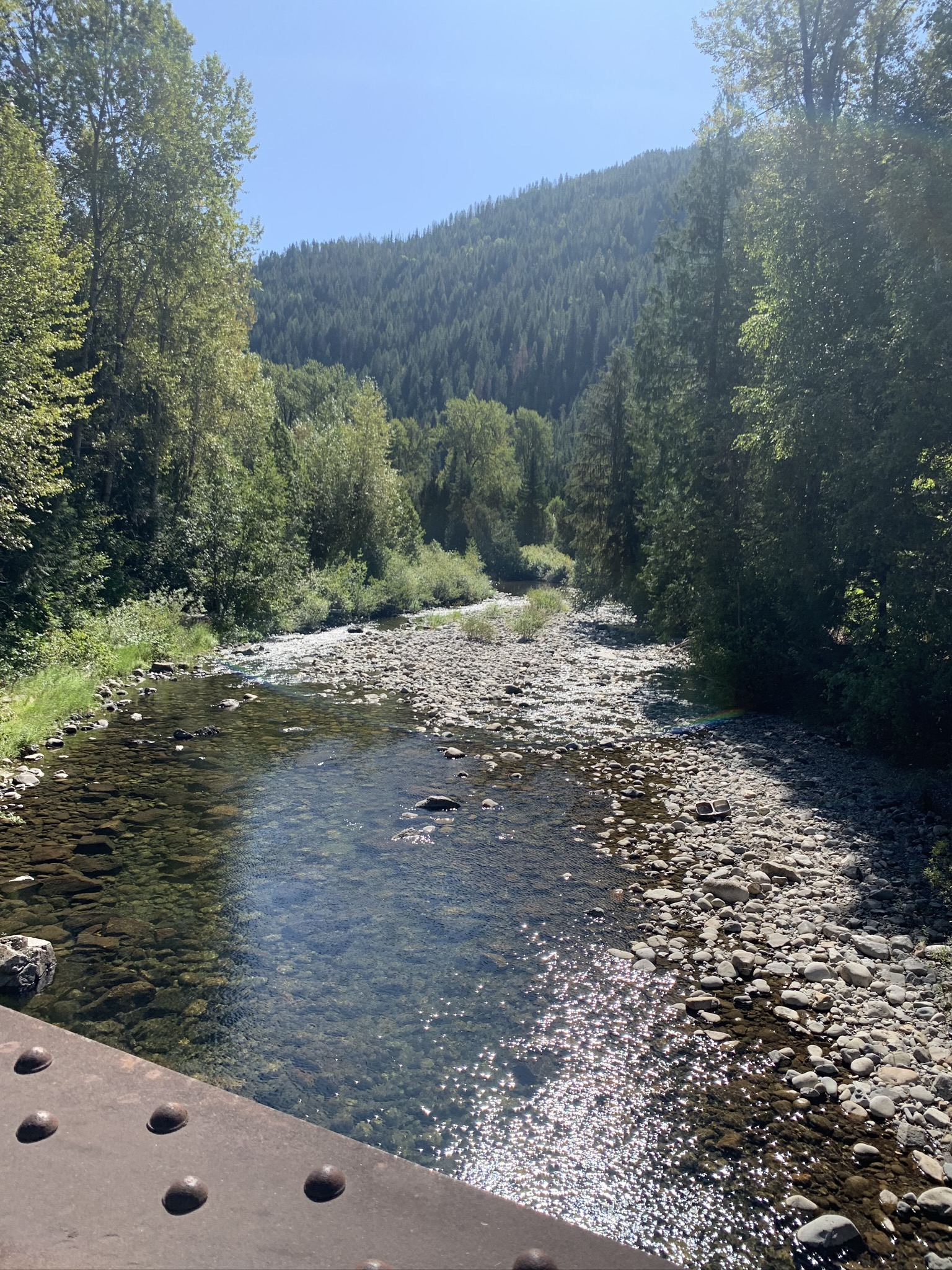
Erie Creek near Salmo

South of the Salmo townsite, the river is joined by Sheep Creek. The Salmo River Ranch, a large ranch that is known as the site of Shambhala Music Festival (an annual electronic music festival that takes place at the end of July since 1998) is located on this portion of the riverbank.

The river continues south to the southern junction of highways 3 and 6 where it is joined by the South Salmo River as that river flows west out of Stagleap Provincial Park. The South Salmo river also contributes a lot of flow to the Salmo.

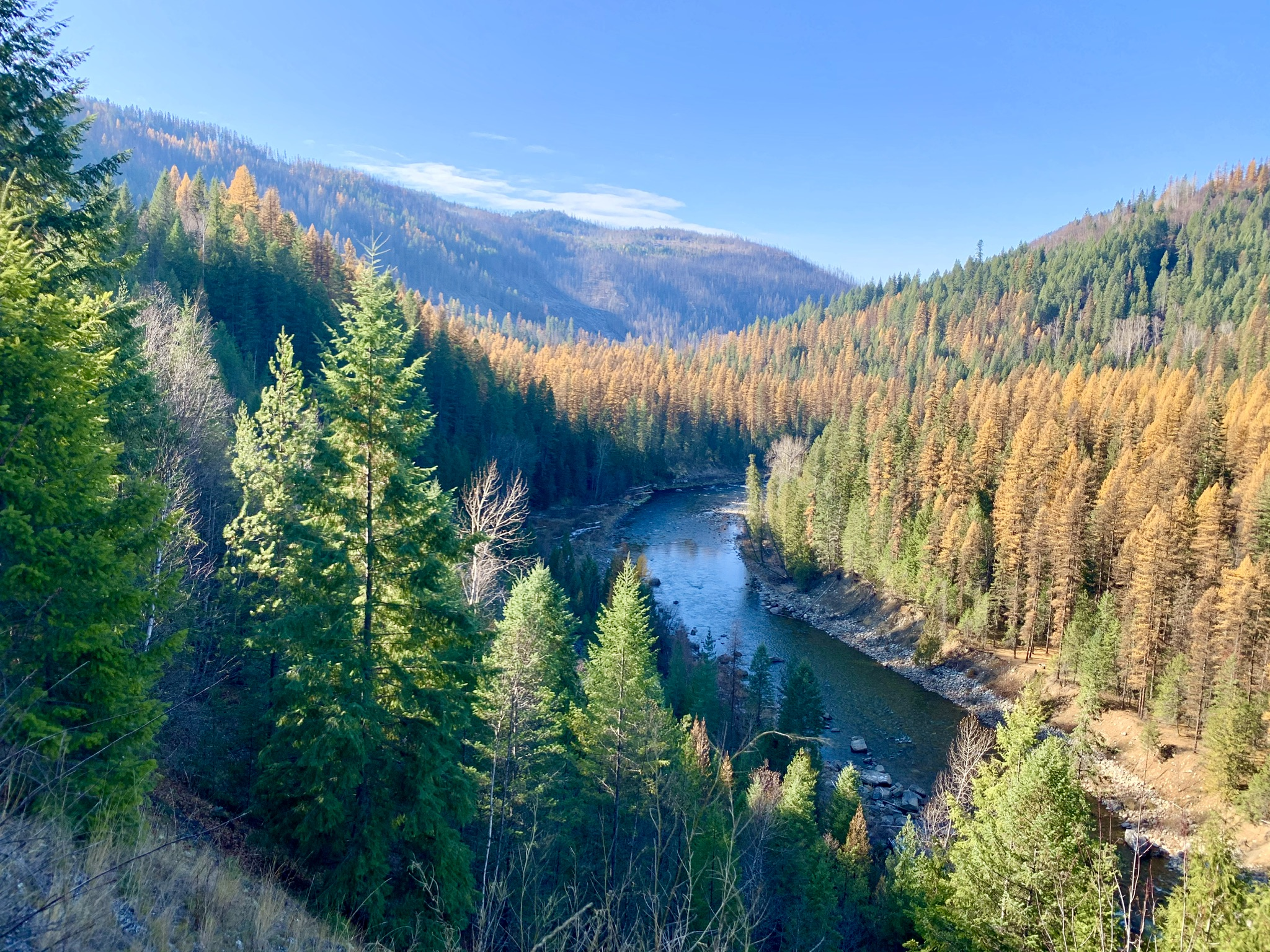
Salmo River north of its confluence with the Pend d’Oreille River

Once the South Salmo joins the main stem, the river turns west and flows for a few kilometres before finally discharging into the Pend d'Oreille River just north of the Canada–United States border at the ghost town of Remac.

The river is very popular amongst locals especially in the summer months. The rivers winding path through rocky mountains has created numerous swimming holes along the rivers' length especially suited for swimming. The rivers mouth at the Pend d'Orielle (where it enters the reservoir formed by the Seven Mile Dam) is at the entrance to a BC Hydro Recreation Area known as the "Pend d'Oreille Valley Wildlife Conservation Area" or the Pend d'Orielle Recreation Area. The area is popular for backcountry camping and swimming amongst locals.

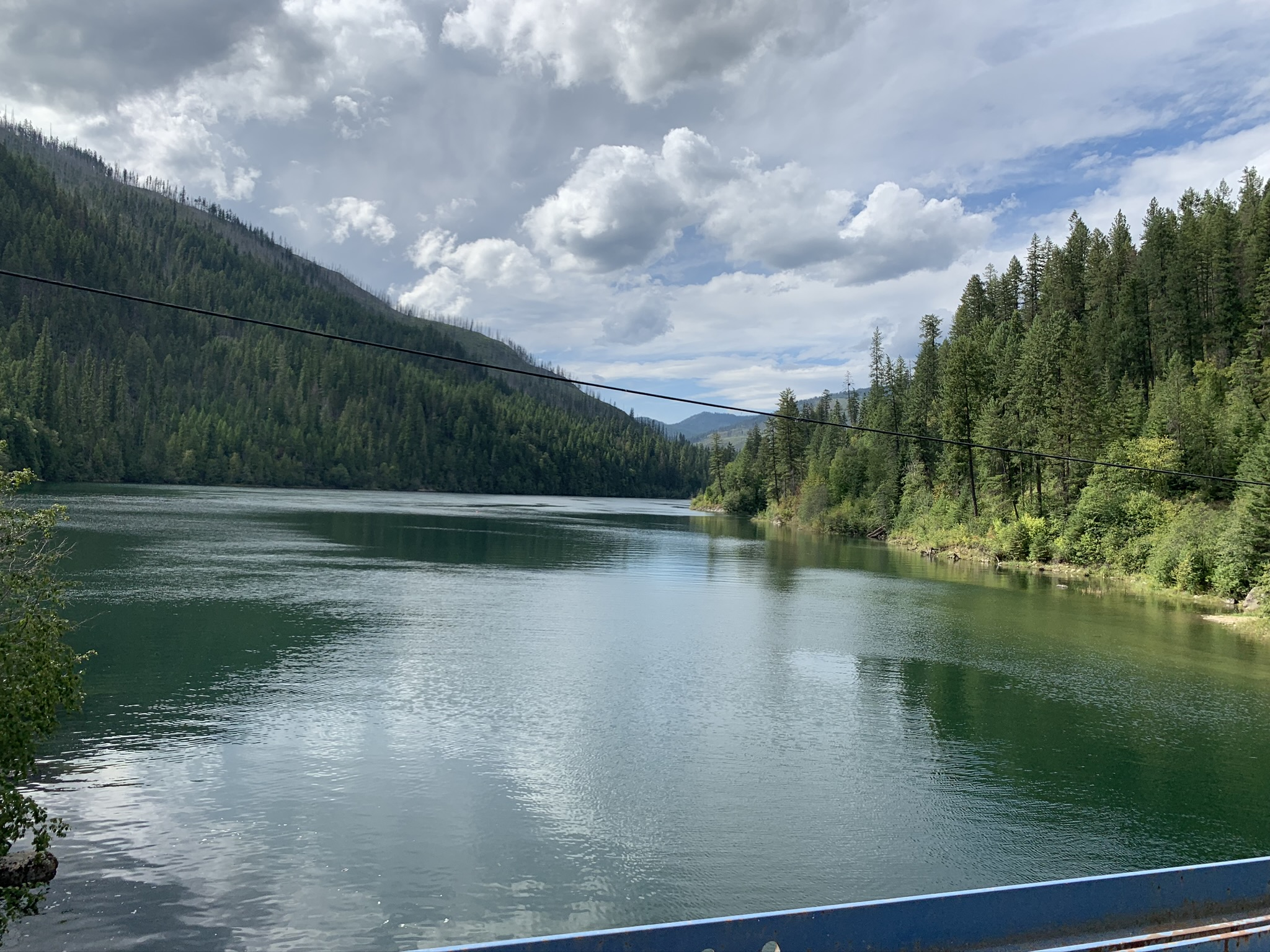
Salmo River at its confluence with the Pend d’Oreille River

== See also ==
- List of rivers of British Columbia
- Tributaries of the Columbia River
