= Ymir Creek (British Columbia) =

Ymir Creek Wildhorse Creek (lower portions)
- Etymology: Named for Ymir town, which is named for Ymir Mountain, which is named for Ymir (Norse god)

Location
- Country: Canada
- Province: British Columbia
- Regional District: Central Kootenay

Physical characteristics
- Source
  - location: Wildhorse Mountain, Selkirk Mountains
- Mouth: Salmo River
  - location: Ymir, British Columbia

Basin features
- River system: Salmo River system

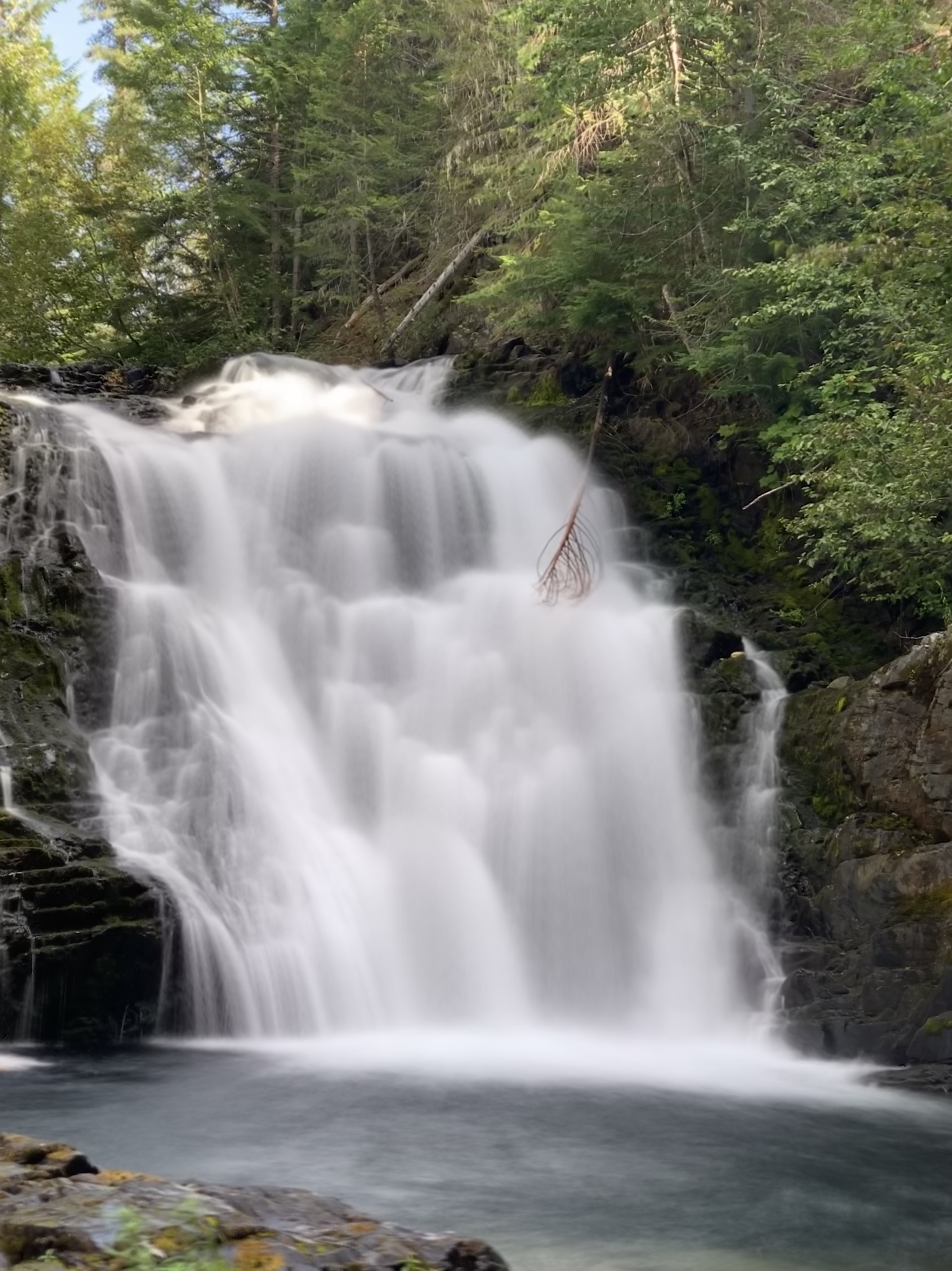
Wildhorse Creek Falls in Ymir, BC.

Ymir Creek is a creek in the Selkirk Mountains in the West Kootenay region of the Regional District of Central Kootenay in British Columbia, Canada. The creek is a tributary of the Salmo River which it meets in the centre of the town of Ymir. Its source is a few kilometres up Wildhorse Mountain. The creek is named for the town of Ymir which in turn was named for Ymir Mountain, a mountain a few kilometres to the north. Ymir Mountain is named for Ymir, the Norse god.

The lower portions of the creek are locally referred to as Wildhorse Creek due to its discharge from Wildhorse Mountain into the Salmo River in Ymir.
