= Metaline Falls–Nelway Border Crossing =

Border crossing between Canada and the United States

Metaline Falls–Nelway Crossing
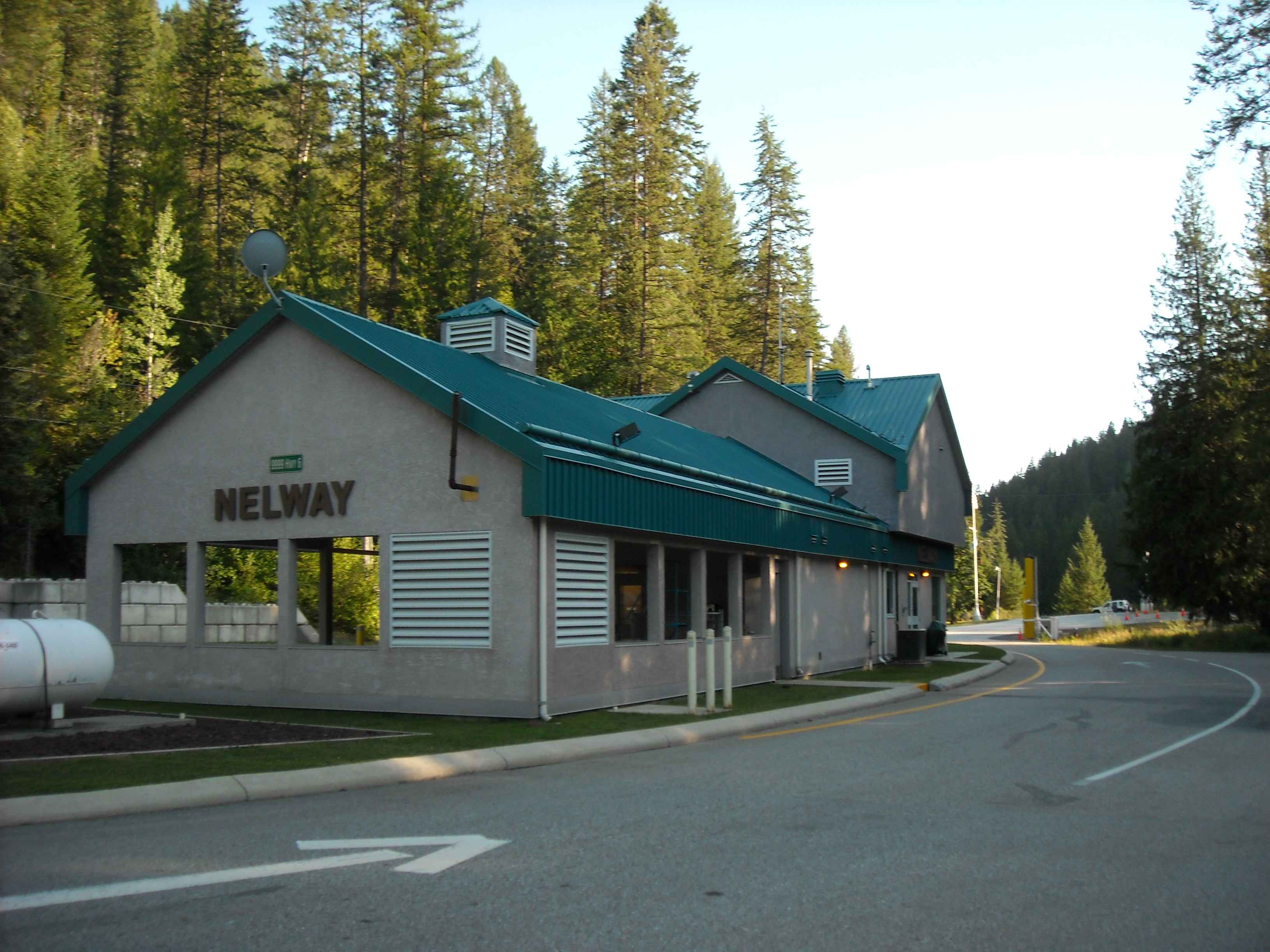
- Canada Border Inspection Station at Nelway, BC

Location
- Country: United States; Canada
- Location: SR 31 / Highway 6; US Port: State Route 31, Metaline Falls, WA 99153; Canadian Port: 9999 Highway 6, Salmo BC V0G 1Z0
- Coordinates: 48.999979°N 117.299706°W

Details
- Opened: 1921

Website
- https://www.cbp.gov/contact/ports/oroville-wa-washington-3019
- U.S. Border Station
- U.S. National Register of Historic Places
- NRHP reference No.: 96001634
- Added to NRHP: January 31, 1997

The Metaline Falls–Nelway Border Crossing connects the town of Metaline Falls, Washington with Nelway and Nelson, British Columbia at the Canada–US border. Access is via Washington State Route 31 on the American side and British Columbia Highway 6 on the Canadian side. This is the easternmost crossing in Washington.

The popular belief is that Nelway is a contraction of "Nelson and Spokane highway" or the Nelson and Fort Sheppard Railway, which passed in the vicinity. Canada has had a customs office in the Nelson area since 1900, but this particular crossing did not exist until the Pend Oreille Highway was completed in 1921. The highway on the BC side officially opened in 1923, but the name Nelway did not appear until 1926.

The British Columbia section of the highway faced criticism for many years due to its narrow, winding, and rough terrain, making travel slow and difficult. To handle increasing traffic, sections were progressively realigned and paved from 1948, and throughout the following decade.

The United States still occupies the original permanent border station at this crossing, built in the mid-1930s; it was recorded on the U.S. National Register of Historic Places in 1997. Canada replaced its depression-era border station in 1951, then replaced it again in 2000. Today the crossing is often used by tourists exploring the International Selkirk Loop. U.S. Customs and Border Protection announced in 2018 that the Metaline Falls station would close at 8 p.m. instead of midnight. This was cut back further to 4 p.m. in 2020 due to the COVID-19 pandemic and remained in place after the border reopened.

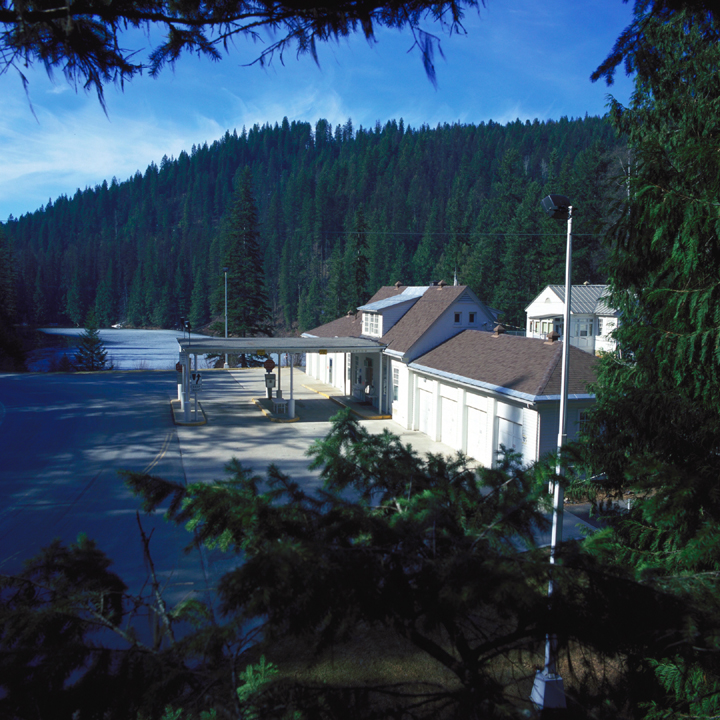
US Border Inspection Station at Metaline Falls, WA

== See also ==
- List of Canada–United States border crossings
