= Quartz Creek =

Quartz Creek might refer to:

- Quartz Creek (British Columbia), a stream in British Columbia, Canada
- Quartz Creek (California)
- Quartz Creek (Gunnison County, Colorado)
- Quartz Creek (Western Australia)
- Quartz Creek (Yukon), a stream in the Klondike region of Yukon, Canada
