= Hall Creek (British Columbia) =

Coordinates: 49°22′08″N 117°14′18″W

Hall Creek is a creek in the Selkirk Mountains in the West Kootenay region of the Regional District of Central Kootenay in British Columbia, Canada. The creek is a tributary of the Salmo River and flows east into the river in the community of Hall, a few kilometres north of the town of Ymir and a few kilometres south of Nelson. The creek and the community of Hall were named for the Osner and Winslow Hall; brothers from Colville, Washington. The brothers were pioneers in the silver rush occurring in the kootenays in the late 1880s and early 1890s In 1886, the brothers led the expedition to Toad Mountain which led to the creation of the Silver King mine, which in turn gave rise to the city of Nelson.
