= Barrett Lake =

Barrett Lake may refer to:

- Barrett Lake in Nova Scotia - see List of lakes in Nova Scotia
- Barrett Lake (British Columbia)
- The lake created by Barrett Dam in California
