= Hall, British Columbia =

Coordinates: 49.374°N 117.239°W

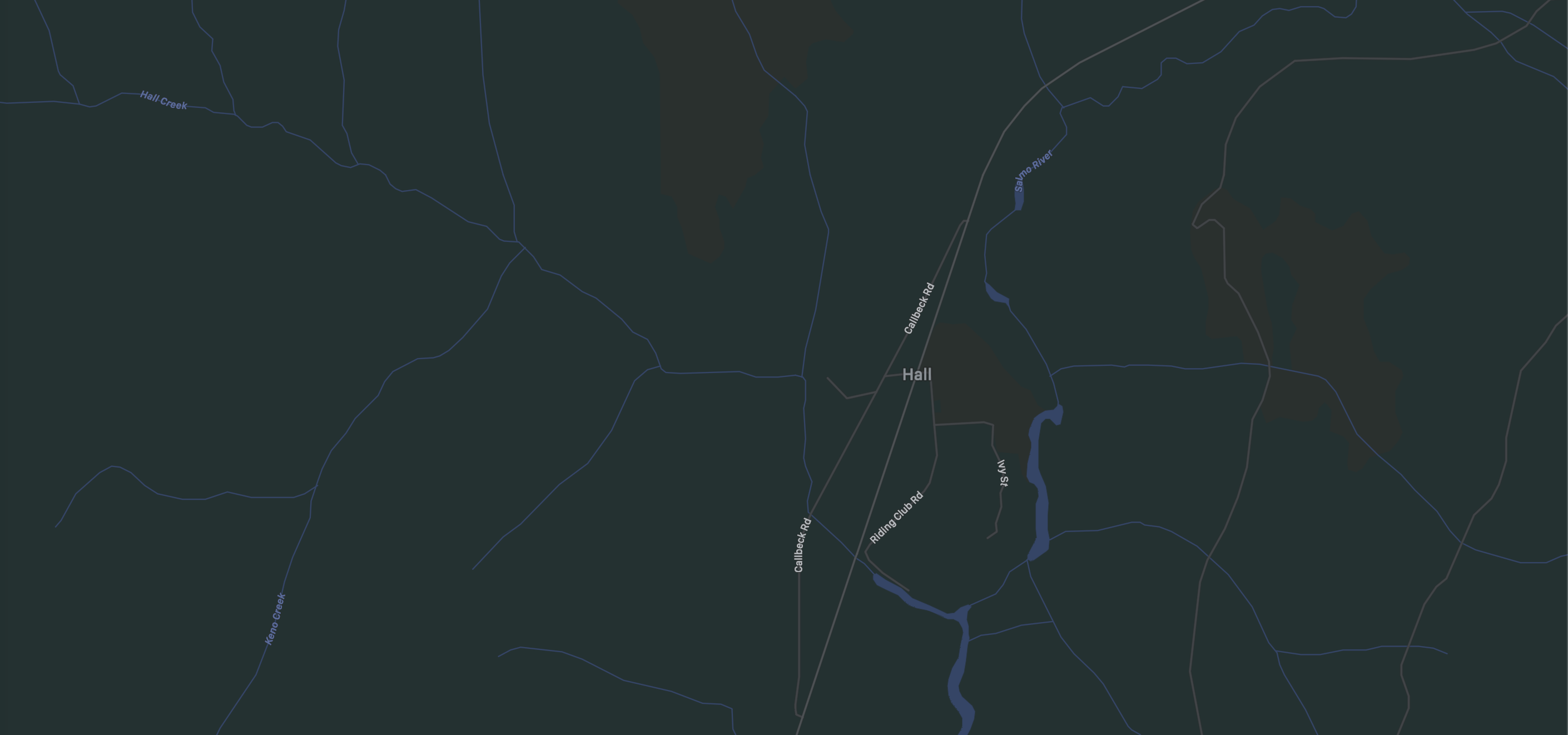
Map of Hall

Hall (locally known as Hall Siding) is a small community in the Selkirk Mountains in the West Kootenay region of the Regional District of Central Kootenay in British Columbia, Canada, south of Nelson and north of Ymir. Hall Creek flows into the Salmo River in the community. British Columbia Highway 6 runs through it.

Hall is named for two brothers (Osner and Winslow Hall) from Colville, Washington, who came to Quartz Creek in 1886 and led an expedition that discovered gold, copper and silver deposits on Toad Mountain. They staked the Silver King mine, which in turn gave rise to the city of Nelson.

The post office was founded in 1898, closed in 1904, reopened in 1914 and closed again in 1925. The Nelson and Fort Sheppard Railway built a station here. One of the original streets still exists.
