= Krestova =

Settlement in Kootenay, Canada

- Unincorporated settlement
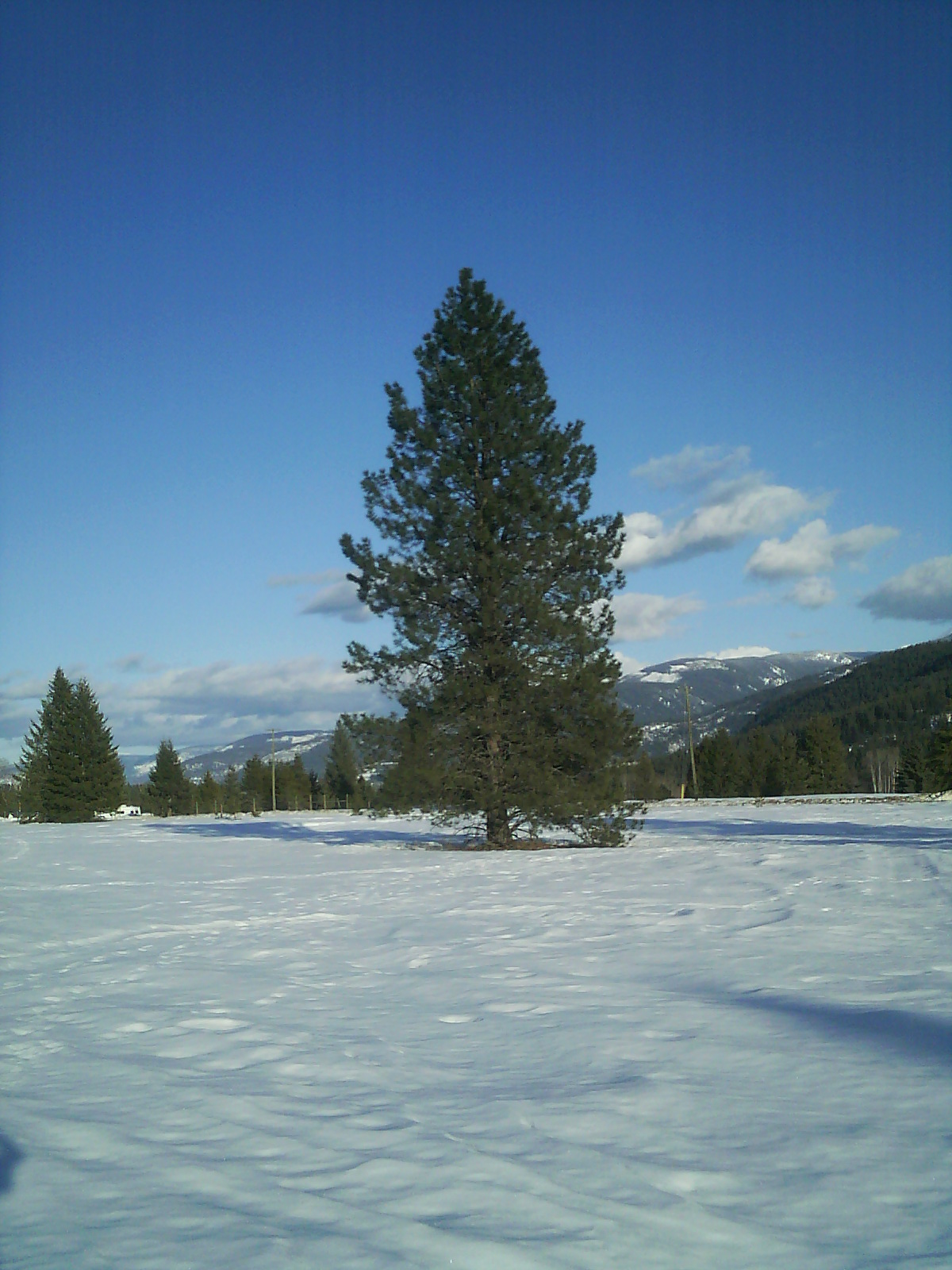

- Location within British Columbia
- Coordinates: 49°26′39″N 117°35′1″W
- Country: Canada
- Province: British Columbia
- Regional district: Central Kootenay
- Established: 1911

Krestova is an unincorporated community of about 150 people in the Kootenay region of British Columbia, Canada. The community was established by members of the Doukhobor religious group, who originally immigrated from Ukraine and Russia, in 1911-12. The name comes from the Russian "Dolina Krestova (Долина Крестова)", meaning "valley of the cross". The area is still home to the "Sons of Freedom" movement, which split from the Doukhobor community in the early 1900s.

== Geography ==
The town is located northwest of the confluence of the Slocan and Kootenay rivers, in the southern region of the province of British Columbia. It is part of the Electoral Area H of the Regional District of Central Kootenay. The nearest large towns are Castlegar to the southwest, and Nelson to the east.

== History ==
Krestova was the centre of decades of conflict between the Sons of Freedom, and the British Columbia government, the Royal Canadian Mounted Police (RCMP), and moderate Doukhobors. The Sons of Freedom, also known as "Freedomites", had moved to Krestova in 1929 and were opposed to many government requirements, especially compulsory public education. Members burned down schools, public buildings, and their own homes — in the summer of 1953, 400 homes in the Krestova area were destroyed. Sons of Freedom staged protests against government actions, often in the nude. In the 1950s, Sons of Freedom children in Krestova were forcibly relocated by the RCMP to a residential school in New Denver, B.C. The provincial government issued a "statement of regret" for these actions in 2004.
