= Salmo–Troup Rail Trail =

Rail trail in British Columbia, Canada

The Great Northern Rail Trail originally known as the Salmo–Troup Rail Trail is a multi-use recreational rail trail located in southeastern British Columbia's West Kootenay region.

It uses a rail corridor that was originally built by the Nelson and Fort Sheppard Railway. The Railway was built by American DC Corbin in the late 1800s in response to the silver rush that was occurring in the West Kootenays. It went from Nelson to the US at Waneta. The railway was sold to Burlington Northern and Santa Fe Railway in 1996, by which point it had already been abandoned. In 1997 the railway was purchased by the provincial government for use as a recreation trail. The rails were removed and gradually the railway was converted into the trail it is today.

The trail runs for 48 kilometres from Nelson, British Columbia to Salmo, British Columbia. It parallels the Salmo River for the majority of its length and passed through several small communities along its route. These include Hall, Porto Rico, and Ymir.
