= Erie Creek (British Columbia) =

Coordinates: 49.1903°N 117.289°W

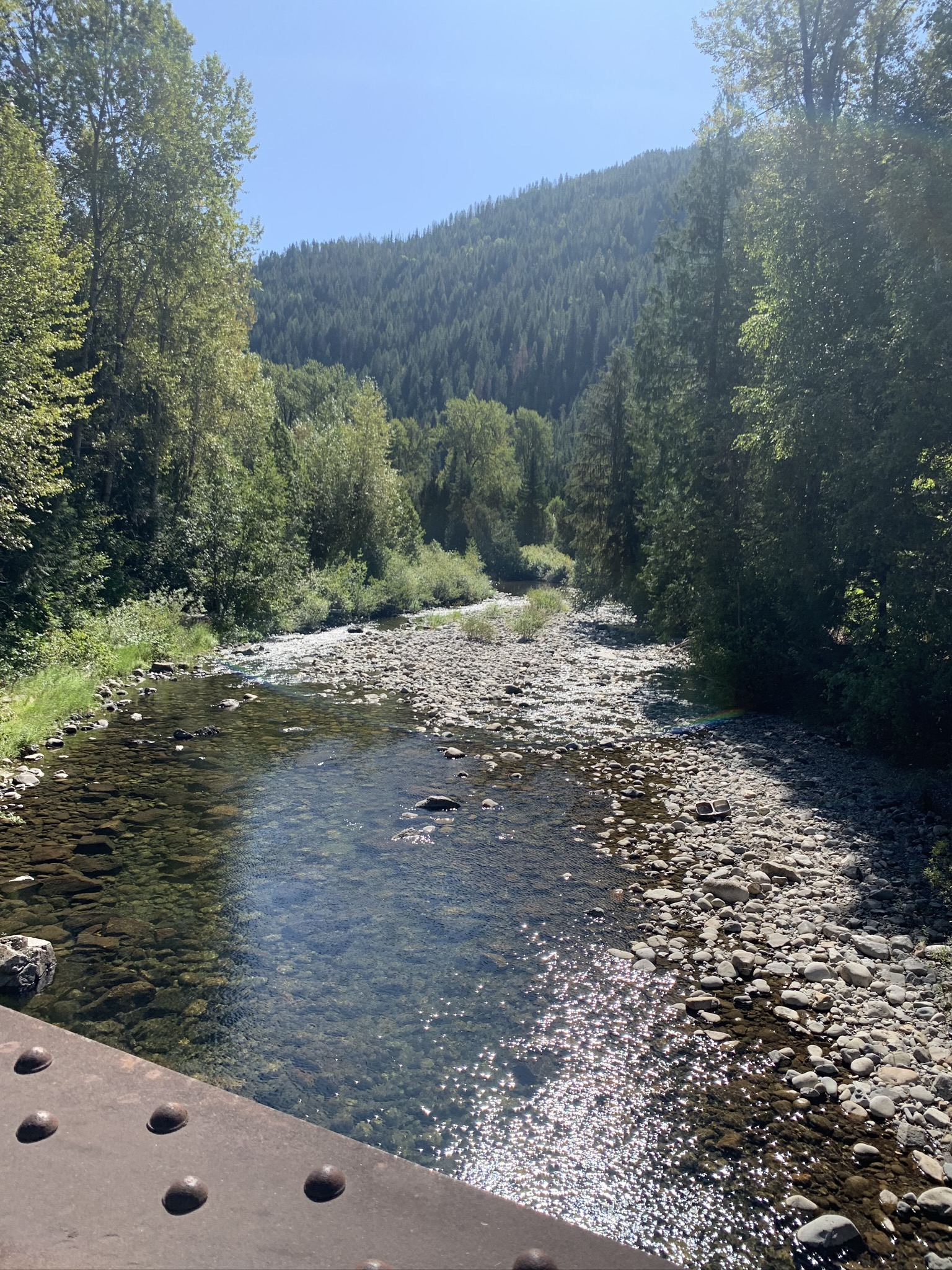
Erie Creek near Salmo

Erie Creek is a creek located in the West Kootenay region of British Columbia. The creek flows into the Salmo River. It was discovered in the 1860s. Erie Creek was originally called North Fork Creek. The creek was mined for gold.
