= Quartz Creek (British Columbia) =

Watercourse in British Columbia, Canada

Coordinates: 49°16′50″N 117°12′43″W

Quartz Creek in Ymir, during the spring Freshet in May 2020

Quartz Creek is a creek in the Selkirk Mountains in the West Kootenay region of the Regional District of Central Kootenay in British Columbia, Canada. This short creek flows into the Salmo River in Ymir, British Columbia. The source of the creek is just to the west of the Ymir townsite a few kilometres up Round Mountain. Quartz creek was mined for gold in the 1860s. The creek is the source of drinking water in the town of Ymir. The Regional District of Central Kootenay added a filtration system in the early 2010s for the community.
