= Recreation Sites and Trails BC =

Government agency in British Columbia, Canada

Agency overview
- Formed: 1939; 87 years ago
- Jurisdiction: British Columbia
- Headquarters: Victoria, British Columbia
- Parent ministry: Ministry of Environment and Climate Change Strategy
- Website: www.sitesandtrailsbc.ca

Recreation Sites and Trails BC (RSTBC) is a branch of the Ministry of Environment and Climate Change Strategy. It is tasked with managing over 1,350 recreation sites and 800 trails across the province of British Columbia, Canada. These sites and trails are part of a unique network offering safe and enjoyable public recreation opportunities for both residents and visitors from around the world.

== History ==
The history of RSTBC can be traced back to 1939 when the British Columbia Forest Service established a Parks Division to manage public recreation on Crown land. After several transformations and the involvement of various ministries, the responsibility for these recreation sites and trails was assigned to the Ministry of Forests, Lands, and Natural Resource Operations.

== Mission and Operations ==
RSTBC's mission is to enhance outdoor recreation opportunities and experiences by managing a sustainable network of recreation sites and trails. The management of these sites includes promoting environmental stewardship, public safety, and the educational values of outdoor recreation.

RSTBC delivers its programs through a headquarters in Victoria, four regional offices, and 19 district offices across the province. A significant portion of the management is handled through partnerships with local communities, First Nations, non-governmental organizations, and private enterprises.

== Economic and Social Impact ==
RSTBC's activities have a profound economic and social impact, particularly in rural communities. The sites and trails not only support local economies by attracting tourism but also contribute to health and wellness by promoting physical activities. Partnerships created through these programs help foster community pride and conservation efforts.

== Environmental and Educational Benefits ==
The sites and trails managed by RSTBC are not only recreational resources but also serve as platforms for environmental education and stewardship. They help in conserving biodiversity and teaching the public about sustainable practices.

== See also ==
- BC Parks
