= British Columbia Highway 6 =

Highway in British Columbia

Highway 6
- Nelson-Nelway Highway; Vernon-Slocan Highway
- Highway 6 highlighted in red

Route information
- Maintained by the Ministry of Transportation and Infrastructure
- Length: 406 km (252 mi)
- Existed: 1941–present
- Tourist routes: Part of the International Selkirk Loop

Major junctions
- South end: SR 31 at the U.S. border in Nelway
- Highway 3 at Salmo; Highway 3A from Nelson to Playmor Junction; Highway 31A at New Denver; Highway 23 in Nakusp; Needles Ferry
- West end: Highway 97 in Vernon

Location
- Country: Canada
- Province: British Columbia
- Major cities: Nelson, Vernon

Highway system
- British Columbia provincial highways
← Highway 5	→ Highway 7

Highway 6 is a two-lane highway passing between the Kootenay and Okanagan regions in the province of British Columbia, Canada. It is divided into two parts—the Nelson-Nelway Highway between the Canada–United States border and Nelson, and the Vernon-Slocan Highway between South Slocan and Vernon. Highway 6 is a north–south highway between Nelway and the Needles Ferry and an east–west highway between the Needles Ferry and Vernon; it has a total length of 407 km (253 mi). It first opened in 1941 and, aside from minor realignments along its concurrences with 3 and 3A, its very winding path through the western Kootenays has not changed since.

== Route description ==
=== Nelson-Nelway Highway ===
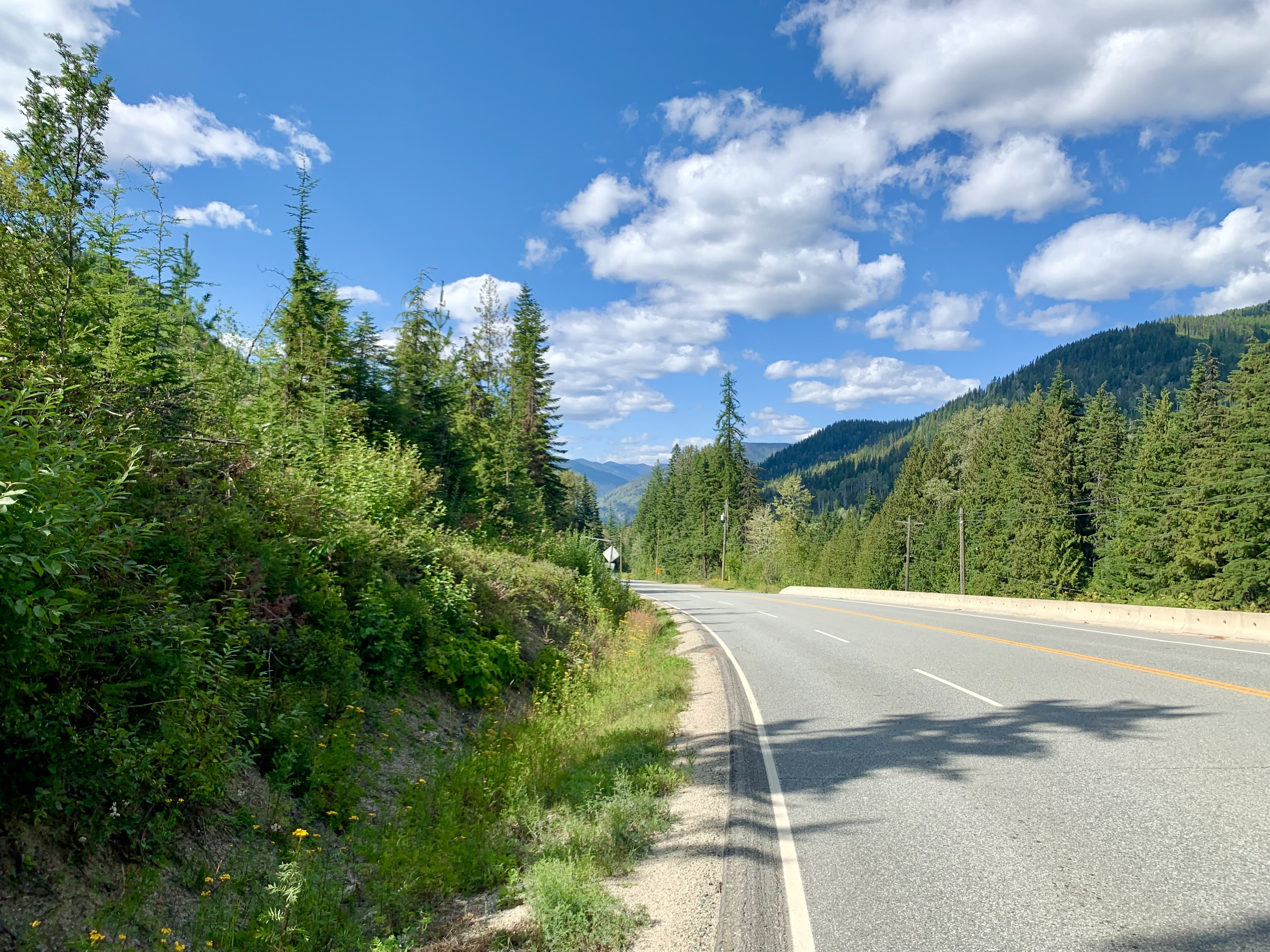
Highway 6 looking north towards Nelson in the Selkirk mountains.

Highway 6 begins at the Canada–United States border crossing at Nelway, where it connects with Washington State Route 31. The highway parallels the Salmo River for the rivers entire length from Nelson to the border and many views of the river can be seen from the highway. From the Canada–United States border, it travels north through the Selkirk Mountains for 10 km (6 mi) to the Burnt Flat Junction, where the Crowsnest Highway (Highway 3) merges onto it from the east. Highway 3 and Highway 6 share a concurrency north for 14 km (9 mi) to the town of Salmo, where Highway 3 diverges west.

From Salmo, Highway 6 goes north for 10 km (6 mi), continuing to follow the Salmo River valley to the town of Ymir. Then it continues north for 34 km (21 mi) passing through the communities of Porto Rico and Hall Siding, to the city of Nelson, just south of which (10 km) access to the Whitewater Ski Resort is located. Highway 3A merges onto Highway 6 in Nelson, and the two highways travel west for 24 km (15 mi) along the Kootenay River, passing through the communities of Taghum, Bonnington Falls, Beasley and Corra Linn to where Highway 3A diverges southwest just west of South Slocan at Playmour Junction. The highway then proceeds north west up the Slocan Valley.

=== Vernon-Slocan Highway ===
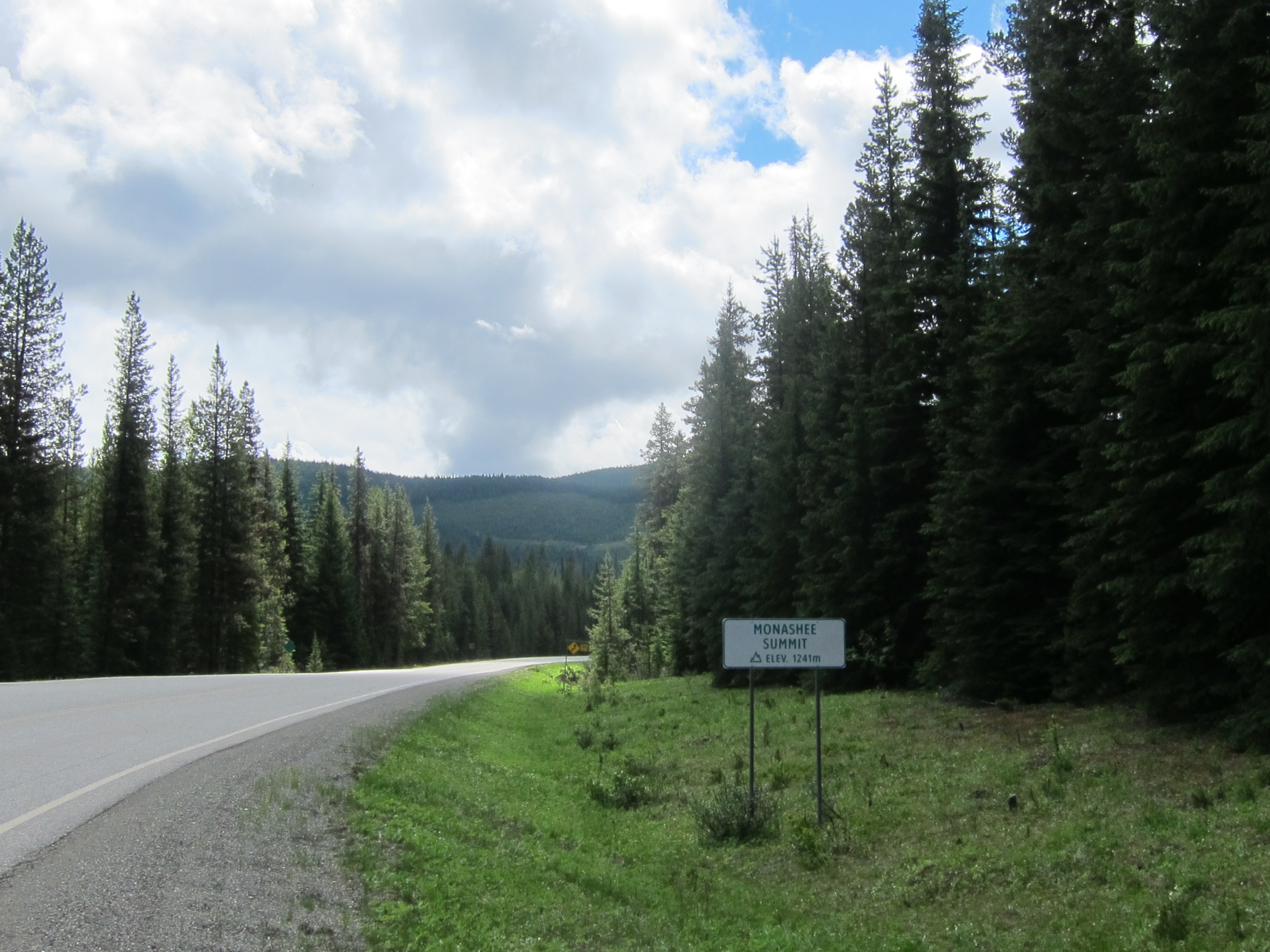
Highway 6 at the Monashee Summit

From South Slocan, Highway 6 follows the Slocan River north for 75 km (47 mi) passing through Winlaw, Slocan City and Silverton to the community of New Denver, where Highway 31A meets Highway 6. 46 km (29 mi) northwest of New Denver, Highway 6 reaches its junction with Highway 23 at the resort community of Nakusp. Highway 6 then turns southwest and proceeds to follow the east bank of the Columbia River (Lower Arrow Lake) for 60 km (37 mi) to Fauquier, on the east shore of Lower Arrow Lake, where the Needles Ferry is located.

From Needles, Highway 6 takes a winding path northwest through the Monashee Mountain range, passing through the community of Cherryville on its exit from the mountains, until it reaches the community of Lumby, 110 km (68 mi) away. Highway 6 then proceeds west on its final 26 km (16 mi) through the district of Coldstream, and terminates at a junction with Highway 97 in Vernon.

== History ==
Some maps show Highway 6 originally continuing west from Vernon to Monte Creek, approximately 26 km (16 mi) east of Kamloops. This section became part of Highway 97 in 1953.

== Major intersections ==
From south to north:

Regional District	Location	km	mi	Destinations	Notes
Central Kootenay	Nelway	0.00	0.00	SR 31 south – Metaline Falls, Spokane	Highway 6 southern terminus; continues into Washington
Central Kootenay	Nelway	0.00	0.00	Canada–US border at Metaline Falls-Nelway Border Crossing	
Central Kootenay		10.37	6.44	Highway 3 east (Crowsnest Highway) – Creston, Cranbrook	South end of Highway 3 concurrency
Central Kootenay	Salmo	24.53	15.24	Highway 3 east (Crowsnest Highway) – Trail, Castlegar	North end of Highway 3 concurrency
Central Kootenay	Nelson	64.67	40.18	Observatory Street	Interchange
Central Kootenay	Nelson	64.91	40.33	Highway 3A east – Balfour, Kootenay Lake Ferry	Cottonwood Creek Interchange; south end of Highway 3A concurrency
Central Kootenay		71.71	44.56	Taghum Bridge across the Kootenay River	
Central Kootenay	Playmor Junction	89.05	55.33	Highway 3A west – Castlegar, Trail	North end of Highway 3A concurrency
Central Kootenay	New Denver	164.06	101.94	Highway 31A east – Kaslo	
Central Kootenay	Nakusp	210.29	130.67	Highway 23 north – Revelstoke	Directional signage changed from north-south to east-west
Central Kootenay		270.16	167.87	Needles Ferry crosses Lower Arrow Lake; Kilometrage does not include ferry	
North Okanagan		338.36	210.25	Monashee Pass – 1,205 m (3,953 ft)	
North Okanagan	Lumby	380.01	236.13	Shuswap Avenue – Mabel Lake	
North Okanagan	Vernon	405.60	252.03	Highway 97 (32nd Street) / 25th Avenue – Lake Country, Kelowna, Kamloops	Highway 6 western terminus; continues as 25th Avenue
1.000 mi = 1.609 km; 1.000 km = 0.621 mi: Concurrency terminus; Route transition
