= Ymir, British Columbia =

- Unincorporated Community
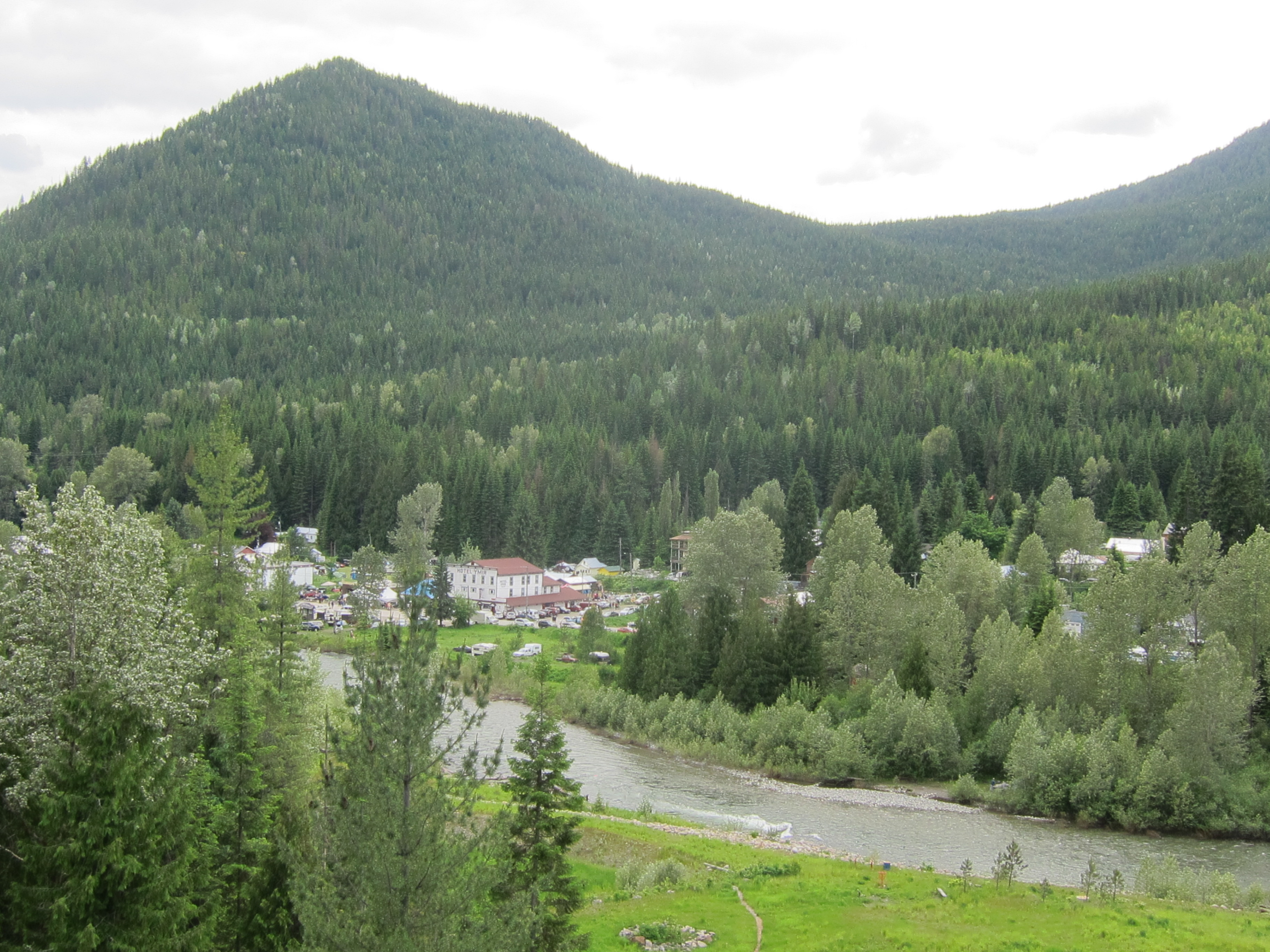
- Ymir and the Salmo River from Wildhorse Mountain

- Location within British Columbia
- Coordinates: 49°17′N 117°13′W
- Country: Canada
- Province: British Columbia
- Regional District: Central Kootenay
- Region: West Kootenay
- First Settled: 1886
- Townsite Laid Out: 1897

Government

Area
  - Total: 1.09 km^{2} (0.42 sq mi)
- Elevation: 730 m (2,400 ft)

Population (2016)
  - Total: 245
  - Density: 224.7/km^{2} (582/sq mi)
- Time zone: PST
- Area codes: 250, 778, 236, & 672
- Highways: Highway 6
- Website: Ymir

Ymir /ˈwaɪmər/ is a village in the Selkirk Mountains in the West Kootenay region of southeastern British Columbia, Canada. Ymir is located where the Salmo River meets Quartz Creek, and Ymir Creek. The locality, on BC Highway 6, is by road about 10 kilometres (6 mi) northeast of Salmo and 34 kilometres (21 mi) south of Nelson.

== History ==
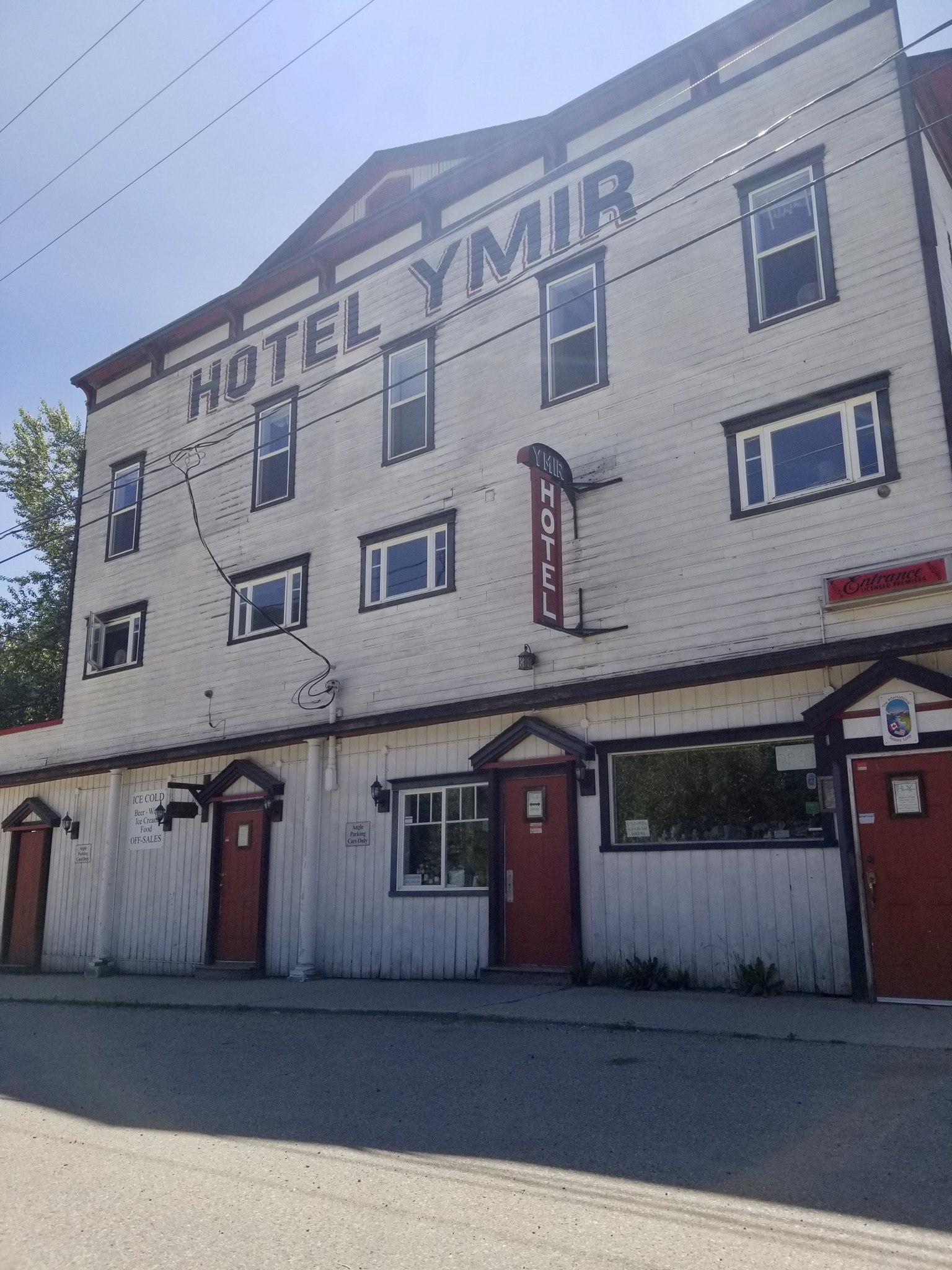
Hotel Ymir

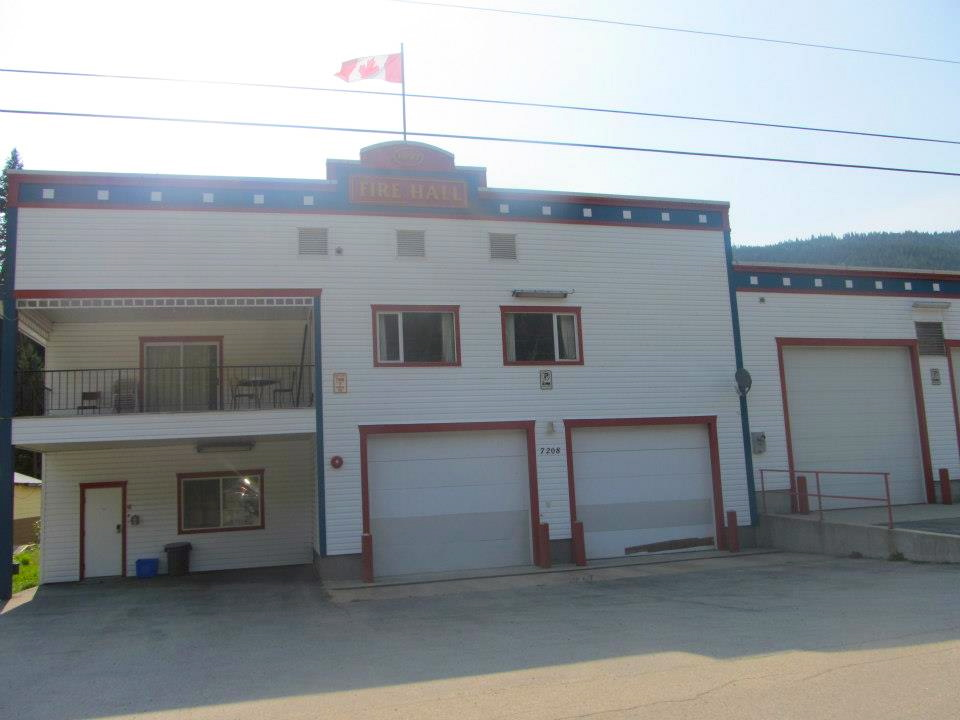
Ymir firehall

Around 1886, prospectors ventured up the Salmon River (Salmo River) and its tributaries in search of gold and silver. Gold was discovered at the mouth of Quartz Creek. The Hall brothers (Osner and Winslow Hall), from Colville, Washington arrived in the early 1890s and observed evidence of what became the Ymir Mine, before moving on. Named for them are the community of Hall, Hall Creek, and Hall Mines Road in Nelson. They discovered what became the Hall Mine and the Silver King Mine. The latter, on Toad Mountain, birthed the city of Nelson.

The claims staked by Jerome Pitre, Joseph Pitre and Oliver Blair in 1895 became the Ymir Gold Mine. This property developed into the largest producer in the British Empire for a period. Although the Kootenay region was in the midst of a silver rush, Ymir was known for gold, and the silver and lead recoveries were relatively minor. By 1905, with the surrounding ore largely extracted and a drop in the gold price, mining activity slowed. The Ymir Mine closed in 1907.

By 1896, a settlement was springing up. The next year, newspapers were calling the new town either as Quartz Creek or Wild Horse. That year, in a post office application, the authorities rejected the suggested Wild Horse name. Daniel Chase Corbin, who was subdividing his townsite, objected to Quartz Creek and proposed a unique name derived from the nearby Ymir Mountain. The earliest mention of the town adopting the name is May 1897. Whereas the Norse pronunciation is ee-mer, the local BC one is why-mer, which took hold no later than the 1920s.

The mining potential motivated Corbin to build the Nelson and Fort Sheppard Railway. Opening in 1893, the railway in turn boosted the mining industry. However, the station at Quartz Creek did not open until 1897 and was called Ymir.

The railway soon became part of the Great Northern Railway fold and its subsequent rebranding. The stop was 7.1 kilometres (4.4 mi) northeast of Boulder Mill, and 11.6 kilometres (7.2 mi) southwest of Hall. Passenger train service ceased in 1951. In 1997, the railway (which had been abandoned in 1989) was acquired by the Government of British Columbia for recreational purposes. The rail corridor was transformed into the Salmo-Troup Rail Trail after the rails were removed in 1999.

An expanding mining industry increased the population and corresponding building activity. This included a hospital, post office, 11 hotels (two of which still stand), a firehall (also standing), a schoolhouse, a police station, churches, and other businesses and residences. By 1897, about 40 buildings existed and the population was approximately 800 in the town and 400 in the immediate area. John McLeod was the inaugural postmaster 1897–1904.

In 1911, the Salmo–Ymir road opened. In 1923, the Nelson–Ymir road opened, completing the last link in the Nelson–Spokane highway (now Highway 6).

Several fires destroyed most of the original buildings, notably in 1903, 1922, and 1933. The fire in 1933 was particularly ferocious, destroying the hospital, which had been considered one of the finest in the Kootenays.

Mining briefly revived again during World War I and when the US Gold Reserve Act of 1934 significantly increased the statutory price of gold, but labour shortages during World War II hampered production. Mining never recovered, but exploration continues in the area.

In 1945, the population was approximately 125; its lowest since 1896.

The village consists of a store, two historic hotels, a fire hall, a restored historic schoolhouse, a church, a community hall, and various residential properties. The location is mainly a bedroom community for the nearby cities of Nelson and Castlegar.

== Demographics ==
The census population was 245 in 2016, 231 in 2011, and 233 in 2006.

== Arts and culture ==
Ymir hosts the annual Tiny Lights Festival in late July.

The proprietor of the Hotel Ymir, Hans Wilking, is the owner of an art collection estimated to be valued at $2 million, featuring over 400 paintings and sculptures from the likes of Norval Morrisseau, and E. J. Hughes. Most works featured in the collection are displayed in the Hotel Ymir, however his most valuable pieces are stored in a facility in the nearby town of Salmo.

== Infrastructure ==
BC Transit operates a weekday service.

== Notable people ==
- Arthur Lakes: geologist, artist, writer, teacher and minister, emigrated with his two sons to Ymir.
- Mickey MacKay: professional ice hockey player, died in a car crash near Ymir.
- Pablo Schreiber: actor, born in Ymir

== Film and television ==
Ymir was featured on the historical television series Gold Trails and Ghost Towns, season 2, episode 13.

The 2012 film The Tall Man, starring Jessica Biel, was shot in Ymir.
