= Ymir Mountain =

Mountain in British Columbia, Canada

Coordinates: 49°25′38″N 117°06′38″W

Ymir Mountain is a 2,398-metre (7,867 ft) summit in the West Kootenay region of southeastern British Columbia, Canada. The nearest higher neighbour is Wood Peak, about 31 kilometres (19 mi) to the southeast.

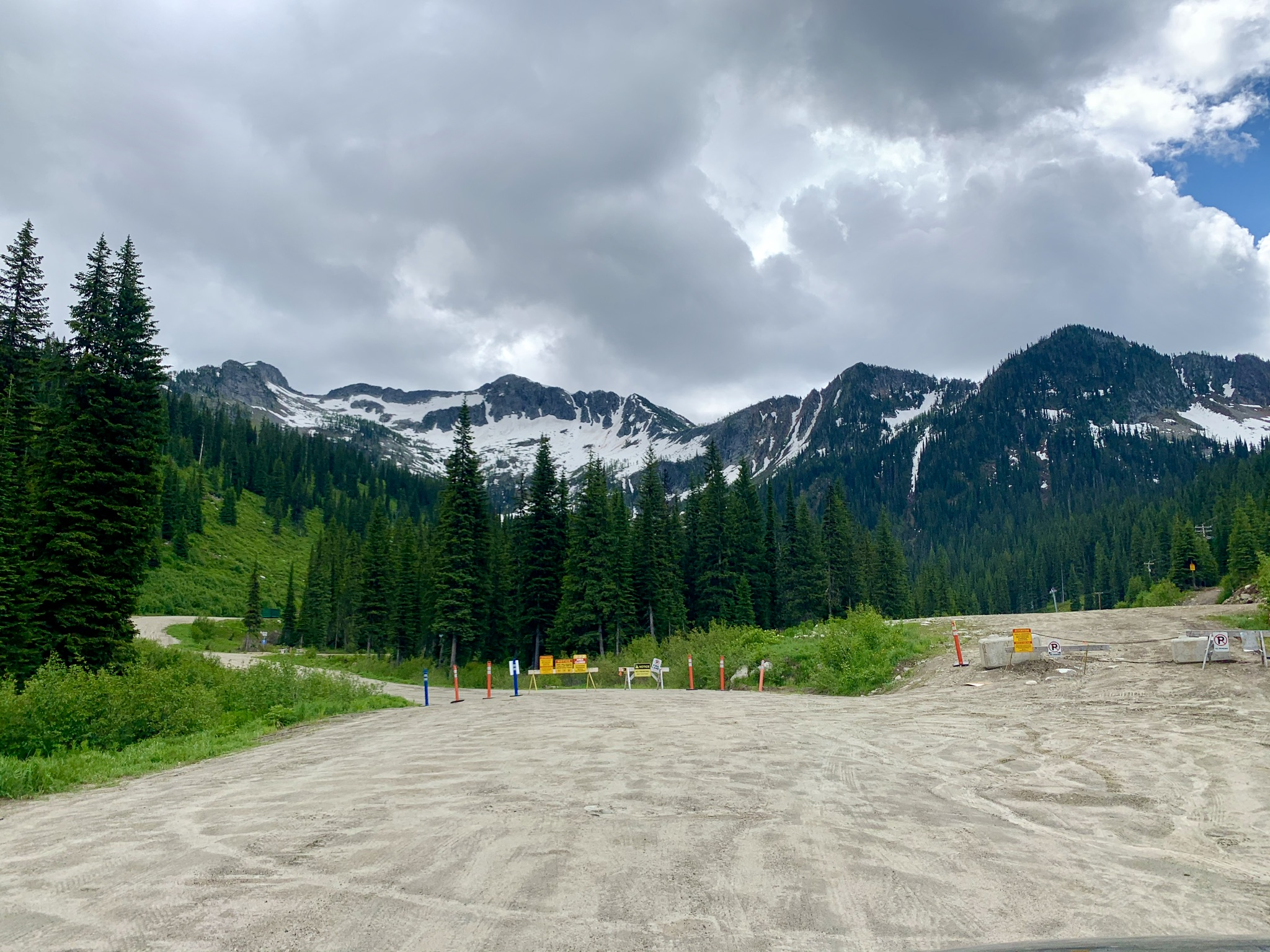
Ymir Mountain in the Selkirk Mountains near Nelson.

== Name origin ==
According to Norse mythology, Ymir was father of the giants and grandfather of Odin, king of the gods. Geologist and explorer George Dawson in his 1889 report was the first to adopt the name. Dawson also selected a Norse source in naming the Valhalla Ranges. Ymir to the southwest derives its name from the mountain.

== Recreation ==
The Whitewater Ski Resort is located on Ymir Mountain and the surrounding peaks, Silver King Mountain and Summit Mountain, which are known collectively as the Ymir Bowl. The mountain receives large amounts of snow in the winter making for an ideal location for the ski resort.
