= Salmo, British Columbia =

Salmo
- Village
- The Corporation of the Village of Salmo
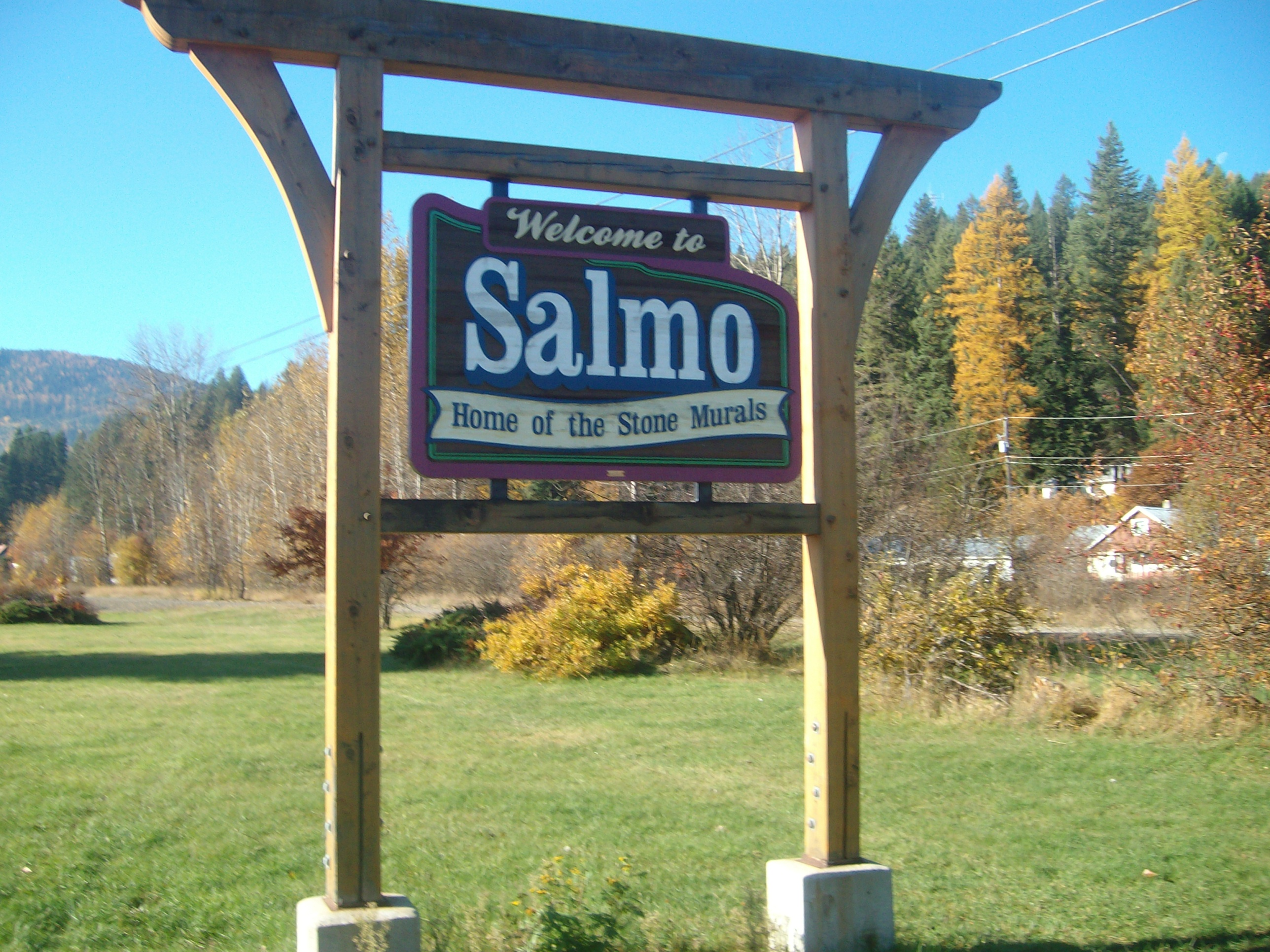
- Salmo's welcome sign

- Location of Salmo Salmo (Canada)
- Coordinates: 49°11′39″N 117°16′40″W
- Country: Canada
- Province: British Columbia
- Region: West Kootenay
- Regional district: Central Kootenay
- Incorporated: 1946

Government
  - Governing body: Salmo Village Council

Area
  - Total: 2.44 km^{2} (0.94 sq mi)
- Elevation: 670 m (2,200 ft)

Population (2016)
  - Total: 1,141
  - Density: 466.2/km^{2} (1,207/sq mi)
- Time zone: UTC−07:00 (MST)
- Postal code: V0G 1Z0
- Area codes: 250, 778, 236, & 672
- Highways: Highway 3 Highway 6
- Waterways: Salmo River
- Website: salmo.ca

Salmo is a village in the West Kootenay region of southeastern British Columbia. It is mostly on the north side of Erie Creek at the confluence with the Salmo River. The place lies largely east of the junction of BC Highway 3 (about 42 kilometres (26 mi) southeast of Castlegar), and BC Highway 6 (about 41 kilometres (25 mi) south of Nelson, and 25 kilometres (16 mi) north of the US border).

== Name origin ==
Originally, the name was either Laprairie or Salmon City, derived from the initial name of the river that dated from around 1860. Prior to the downstream damming of the Columbia River from the 1930s, salmon frequented this tributary. In 1893, the settlement name became Salmon or Salmon Siding. At that time, Erie Creek was called the North Fork of the river. In 1896, the community name changed to Salmo, and the river soon followed suit. It is unclear whether the town or postal authorities sought the less common name, which is Latin for salmon, and also the scientific name for the genus of fish to which Atlantic salmon and trout belong.

== Early settlers ==
When the Nelson and Fort Sheppard Railway (N&FS) was opened in 1893, this was one of the original stations. During the railway construction, Foley, Welch and Stewart was a prime contractor, and Pete Larson was a subcontractor. The Larson headquarters likely became the foundation for the settlement. The construction camp was the scene of a cook's murder following a gambling dispute. During a sale of townsite lots in 1896, 130 sold in 10 days. By 1899, two general stores and four hotels existed. The Kootenay Shingle Mill operated 1901–1928.

== Mining ==
Increased mining in the area triggered the initial growth of the community. Much of this activity was along the east-west Sheep Creek, which flows into the Salmo River about 6 kilometres (3.7 mi) to the south. Gold ore from the Yellowstone mine was wagoned to Salmo for loading onto the N&FS 1900–1902. The mini galena boom of 1908 saw 200 properties staked or re-staked. Notable ones were the HB about 7 kilometres (4.3 mi) southeast of Salmo, and the Emerald, a few miles farther south. The latter wagoned 1,100 tons to Salmo in 1909, which subsequently refined to 382 tons of lead and almost 1,700 ounces of silver. Gold mining along Sheep Creek diminished from the early years of World War I, by which time base metal mining was well established. In the later 1920s, Salmo Consolidated Mines and C.R. Blackburn acquired expired claims, and rising lead and zinc prices triggered increasing activity.

Tungsten and molybdenum sustained the Emerald during the 1930s, despite falling base metal prices. Acquired by the federally owned Wartime Metals Corporation in 1942, a new mill and substation were constructed, but only operated for six weeks before being shut down. Canex restarted production in 1947, expanded to zinc and lead in 1949, and added neighbouring mines and increased capacity in 1951. A small settlement of 150 dwellings, called Jersey after the adjacent mine, sprang up. Operations continued until 1971, and the settlement buildings were auctioned in 1973.

In 1946, the HB resumed exploration. Ore was trucked to Trail. Completed in 1953, and expanded in 1958, the mill produced concentrate for trucking to Trail. Employees lived in camp or commuted from Salmo. Operations shut down in 1966.

== Present community ==
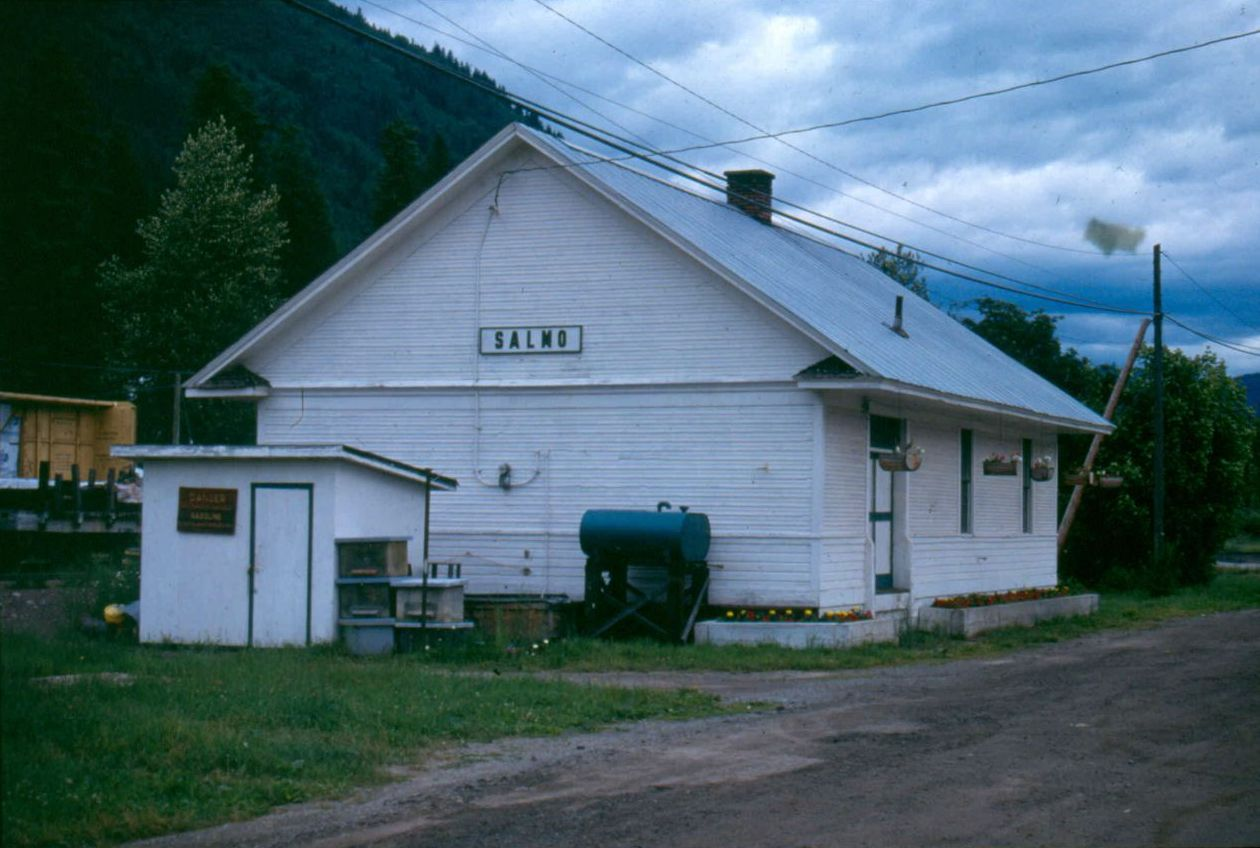
Former train station, Salmo, 1993

West Kootenay Power and Light brought electricity in 1931. Incorporated as a village in 1946, Salmo benefits from passing tourists. On the western perimeter, at the Sal-crest Motel, is the word's oldest phone booth (1977). On the northwest side of the highway downtown, the former N&SF combination station/freight shed (a designated heritage building) stands on the Salmo-Troup Rail Trail. This building dates from 1913, a replacement after the Great Northern Railway (GN) relocated the original to Northport, Washington, over a dispute with the local council. Farther along at the information board is the world's largest penny (1995).

On the southeast side of the highway, the ornate two-storied wooden Salmo Hotel (1912) occupies a corner lot. The nearby Jas. R. Hunnex drugstore (1934) is now a café. The Kootenay Stone Centre school of masonry offers one-week courses. The municipal campground is in KP Park. The Salmo Dinner Jacket, a plaid lumberjack shirt/jacket, has proven popular. Numerous outdoor activities include hiking, fishing, biking, golfing and skiing.

== Demographics ==
In the 2021 Census of Population conducted by Statistics Canada, Salmo had a population of 1,140 living in 568 of its 599 total private dwellings, a change of −0.1% from its 2016 population of 1,141. With a land area of 2.44 km^{2} (0.94 sq mi), it had a population density of 467.2/km^{2} (1,210.1/sq mi) in 2021.

== Shambhala Music Festival ==
Since 1998, during the last week of July, the community of Salmo has hosted the Shambhala Music Festival. The 2020 and 2021 editions of the festival were cancelled due to the COVID-19 pandemic. Regular, yearly scheduling resumed in 2022.

== Television ==
Salmo was featured on the historical television documentary series Gold Trails and Ghost Towns (season 3, episode 1). Salmo people were also featured on the show Canadian Pickers (season 2, episode 7).

== Radio ==
Like the library, CFAD-FM is a volunteer community radio station. It began broadcasting as a developmental Community Radio Station on October 11, 2008 at 92.1 FM in Salmo, British Columbia.

On May 2, 2012, Salmo FM Radio Society received approval from the Canadian Radio-television and Telecommunications Commission (CRTC) to operate an English language FM community radio station to serve Salmo on the frequency of 91.1 MHz.
