= Whitewater Ski Resort =

Ski resort in British Columbia, Canada

Whitewater Mountain Resort
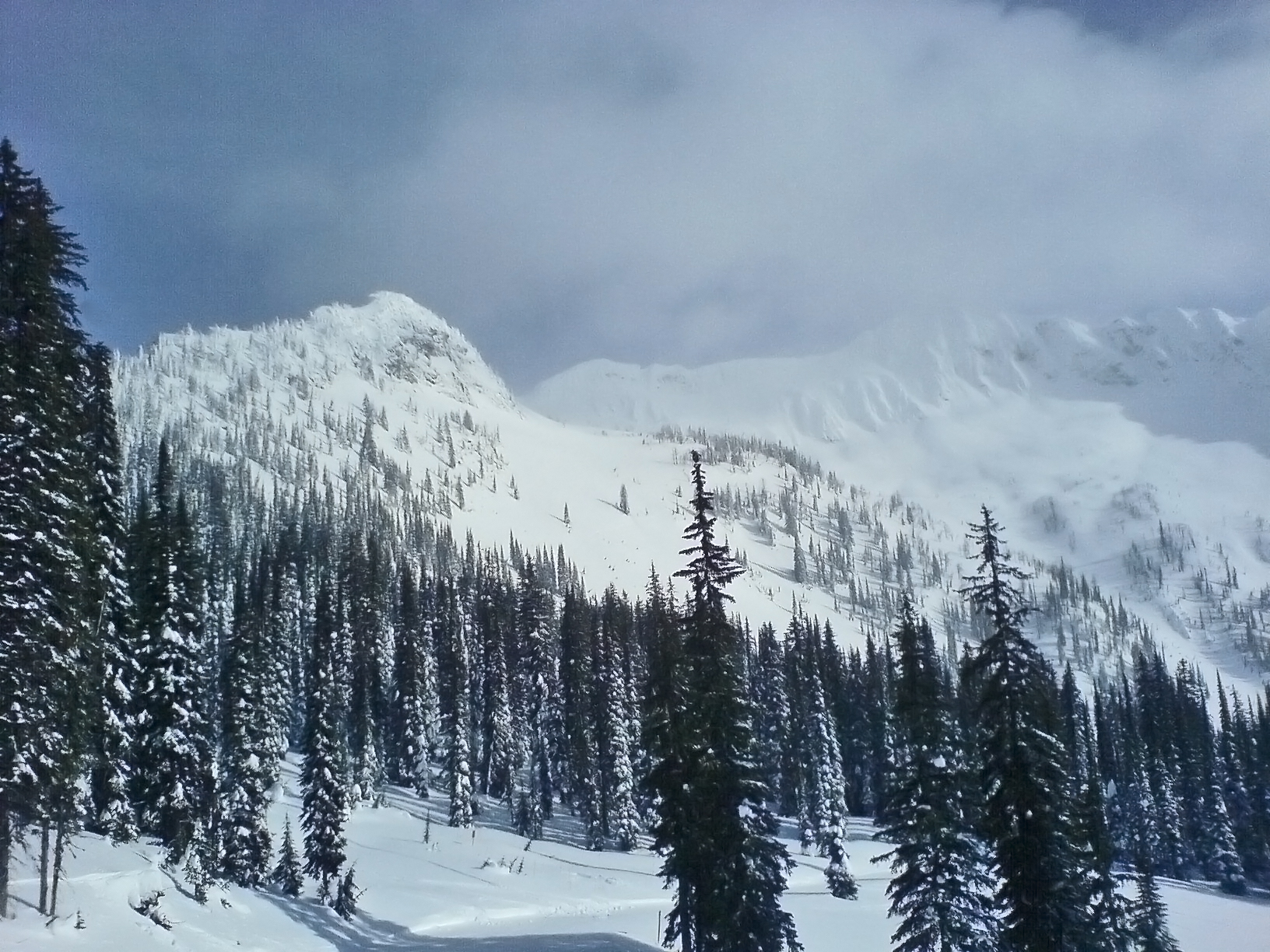

- Location within British Columbia Location within Canada
- Location: British Columbia, Canada
- Nearest city: Nelson - 20 km (12 mi)
- Coordinates: 49.44°N 117.15°W
- Vertical: 614 m (2,014 ft)
- Top elevation: 2,063 m (6,768 ft); 2,400 m (7,874 ft); Ymir Peak
- Base elevation: 1,630 m (5,350 ft), 1,422 m (4,665 ft), Glory lift
- Skiable area: 4.79 km^{2} (1,180 acres)
- Trails: 97 Trails: 9% Beginner; 29% Intermediate; 62% Advanced
- Longest run: 1.6 km (1.0 mi)
- Lift system: 1 double chairlift,1 triple chairlift, 2 quad chairlifts, 1 handle tow
- Snowfall: 12 m (472 in; 39 ft)
- Website: whitewatermountainresort.com

Whitewater Mountain Resort is a ski resort in western Canada, located 10 km southeast of Nelson in southern British Columbia. In the Selkirk Mountains, the resort is situated in Ymir bowl, beneath the 2,400-metre-high (7,874 ft) Ymir Mountain. The Selkirks receive plentiful, dry snow, and the location in a high alpine bowl provides an annual snowfall average of approximately 12 m (472 in; 39 ft).

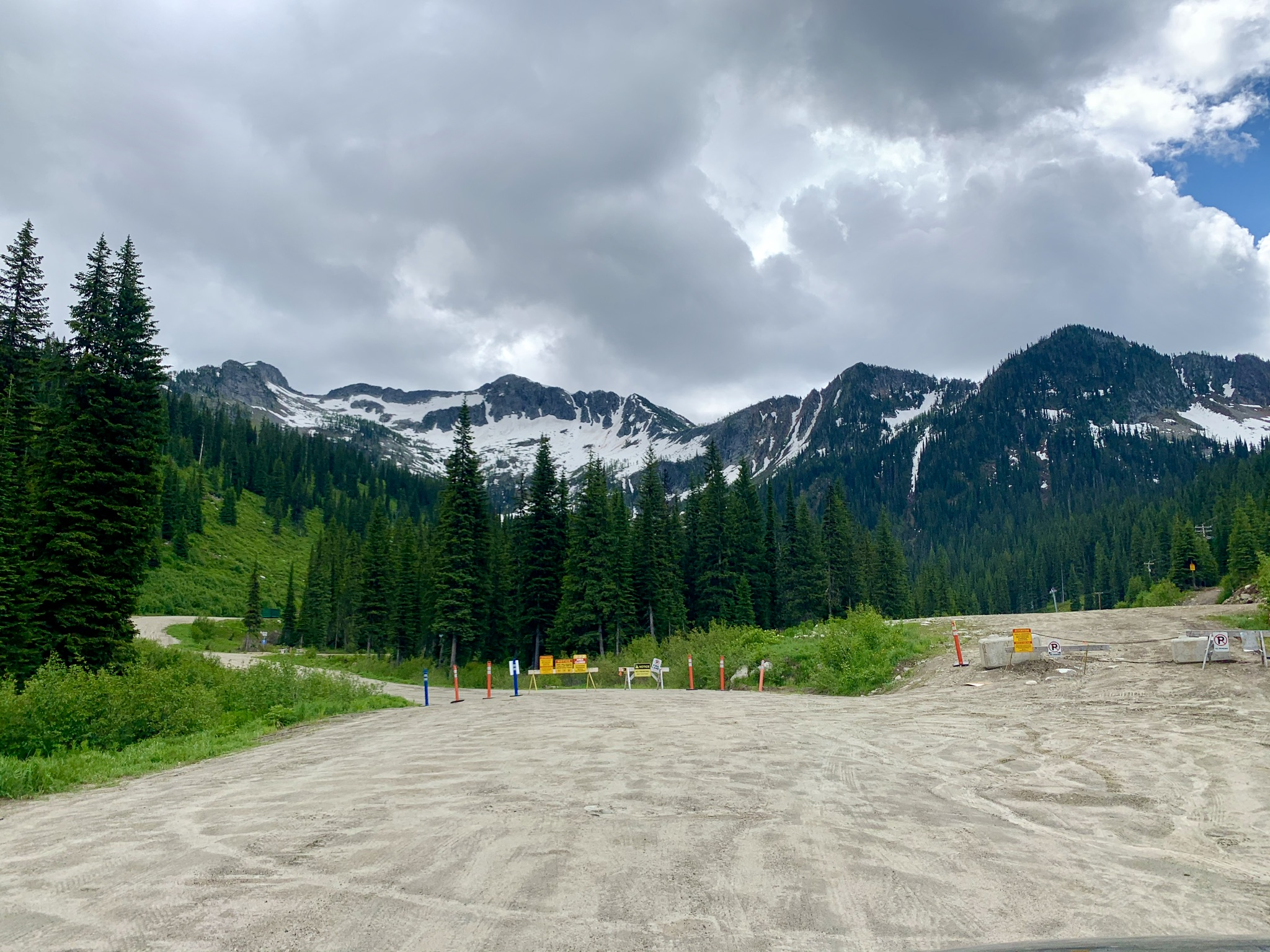
Ymir Mountain in the Selkirk Mountains near Nelson.

The elevation of the parking lot is 1,605 m (5,266 ft) and the lift-served summit is 2,068 m (6,785 ft). While Ymir Peak is not included within the ski area boundary, lifts climb both shoulders of the bowl and provide easy traverse routes along ridges to the top. In addition to its snow, the resort is renowned for its tree skiing and steep runs; only 9% of the runs are beginner, while 29% are intermediate and the remaining 62% are advanced. Areas surrounding Whitewater, including West Arm Provincial Park, are renowned for easy access for backcountry split boarding and ski touring.

== Lifts and terrain ==
The resort consists of four chairlifts - one triple chair (installed in 2010), one double chair (installed in 1994), two fixed-grip quad chairs (one installed in 2017, the other in 2023) - a handle tow, 6.1 km (3.8 mi) of Nordic trails, and a lodge with an award-winning cafeteria, a rental shop, a retail shop, and guest services.

The Summit Chairlift accesses the south ridge of Ymir bowl, and offers a wide variety of gladed blue and black runs. The Silver King double chair runs up the north ridge of Ymir bowl, and provides access to the resorts only beginner runs. The Summit lift was purchased new from Leitner-Poma, while the Silver King was purchased from Whistler, where it had previously been the Olive chair. From the top of either chair, skiers who are properly equipped can traverse the ridges towards Ymir Peak, and then choose from a multitude of lines that lead back to the base area.

The triple-seat fixed-grip Glory chair vertically rises 623 m (2,044 ft) in eleven minutes, opening up the Backside area, doubling the resort's boundaries. It added 3.03 km^{2} (750 acres) of advanced and intermediate ski terrain to the existing 2.30 km^{2} (570 acres), for a total area of 5.33 km^{2} (1,320 acres) skiable terrain. Along with the construction of the lift, much of the surrounding area was logged to create more open and skiable glades. Built by Doppelmayr, this lift was originally installed in Colorado at Vail in 1980 as its High Noon lift.

In 2023, the Resort opened the Raven/Yutlx/Qukin chair. This quad chair takes skiers and riders to the top of Silver King ridge, opening up 123 acres of terrain and 14 new groomed and gladed runs.

Because of its steep terrain and plentiful snow, Whitewater is frequented by many backcountry skiers; this situation, however, creates a significant avalanche hazard, and avalanche control is among the company's largest expenditures.

== History ==
Skiing began in Nelson in 1932, with the Silver King Skiers, following Danny McKay's success in the National ski jumping contests. In 1974, a coalition of local residents backed the creation of a new resort in a more suitable location. The Ymir bowl was chosen, and Whitewater Resort opened in 1976.

On August 8, 2008, it was announced that Knee Deep Development Corp. purchased Whitewater Ski Resort from owners Mike and Shelley Adams.

The Glory expansion and Whitewater's first new chairlift in 17 years began operating on December 24, 2010. Pre-owned and formerly operated at Vail, it opened easy access to what was previously backcountry terrain, vastly decreasing lift lineups.

== Expansions ==
The base facilities were installed over 30 years ago, and usage levels of existing facilities were often above comfortable capacity, especially on heavy snowfall days and traditional holidays. In 2002, Whitewater Ski Resort announced a plan for expansion and improvement. Named the Master Plan, the plan was proposed in 2002, accepted by the Ministry of Tourism, Culture and Arts (MTCA) in 2007, and modified in 2010 by the Knee Deep Development Corporation which purchased the resort two years earlier.

The revised plan includes 3 chairs up Backside, one up White Queen, a Sherpa Ridge lift and a quad chair. The plan is expected to increase White Water's downhill comfortable carrying capacity (CCC) from its current 1,106 to 5,000 skiers/riders.

== See also ==
- List of ski areas and resorts in Canada
