= Regional District of Central Kootenay =

Regional district in British Columbia, Canada

Central Kootenay
- Regional district
- Regional District of Central Kootenay
- Logo

- Location in British Columbia
- Country: Canada
- Province: British Columbia
- Administrative office location: Nelson

Government
  - Body: Board of directors
  - Chair: Aimee Watson (Area D)
  - Vice chair: Ron Toyota (Creston)
  - Electoral areas: A - Wynndel—East Shore–Kootenay Lake; B - Creston East - Kingsgate; C - Creston West; D - Kaslo; E - Nelson; F - North Shore; G - Salmo; H - Slocan Valley; I - Tarrys; J - Lower Arrow—Columbia; K - The Arrow Lakes

Area
  - Land: 22,094.94 km^{2} (8,530.90 sq mi)

Population (2016)
  - Total: 59,517
  - Density: 2.7/km^{2} (7.0/sq mi)
- Time zone: UTC-7 (PCT)
- Website: www.rdck.ca

The Regional District of Central Kootenay (RDCK) is a regional district in the province of British Columbia, Canada. As of the 2016 census, the population was 59,517. The area is 22,130.72 square kilometres. The administrative centre is located in the city of Nelson. Other municipalities include the City of Castlegar, the Town of Creston, the Village of Salmo, the Village of Nakusp, the Village of Kaslo, the Village of New Denver, the Village of Silverton, the Village of Ymir and the Village of Slocan (known locally as Slocan City to distinguish it from the appellation "the Slocan" for the entire Slocan Valley).

== Demographics ==
As a census division in the 2021 Census of Population conducted by Statistics Canada, the Regional District of Central Kootenay had a population of 62,509 living in 28,006 of its 31,588 total private dwellings, a change of 5% from its 2016 population of 59,517. With a land area of 22,078.1 km^{2} (8,524.4 sq mi), it had a population density of 2.8/km^{2} (7.3/sq mi) in 2021.

Panethnic groups in the Central Kootenay Regional District (2001−2021)
Panethnic group	2021		2016		2011		2006		2001	
Panethnic group	Pop.	%	Pop.	%	Pop.	%	Pop.	%	Pop.	%
European (Note: Statistic includes all persons that did not make up part of a visible minority or an indigenous identity.)	54,225	88.64%	53,015	90.87%	53,260	92.95%	52,135	94.29%	53,780	95.19%
Indigenous	4,090	6.69%	3,365	5.77%	2,680	4.68%	2,040	3.69%	1,740	3.08%
South Asian	730	1.19%	440	0.75%	185	0.32%	185	0.33%	60	0.11%
East Asian (Note: Statistic includes total responses of "Chinese", "Korean", and "Japanese" under visible minority section on census.)	530	0.87%	590	1.01%	615	1.07%	490	0.89%	390	0.69%
Southeast Asian (Note: Statistic includes total responses of "Filipino" and "Southeast Asian" under visible minority section on census.)	480	0.78%	355	0.61%	175	0.31%	95	0.17%	140	0.25%
African	320	0.52%	230	0.39%	185	0.32%	130	0.24%	180	0.32%
Latin American	255	0.42%	185	0.32%	80	0.14%	115	0.21%	55	0.1%
Middle Eastern (Note: Statistic includes total responses of "West Asian" and "Arab" under visible minority section on census.)	50	0.08%	10	0.02%	0	0%	30	0.05%	95	0.17%
Other (Note: Statistic includes total responses of "Visible minority, n.i.e." and "Multiple visible minorities" under visible minority section on census.)	225	0.37%	160	0.27%	115	0.2%	55	0.1%	60	0.11%
Total responses	61,175	97.87%	58,340	98.02%	57,300	98.05%	55,290	98.94%	56,495	99.08%
Total population	62,509	100%	59,517	100%	58,441	100%	55,883	100%	57,019	100%

- Note: Totals greater than 100% due to multiple origin responses.

== Municipalities ==
Municipality	Government Type	Population 2011	Population 2016	Change
Nelson	city	10,230	10,572	+3.34%
Castlegar	city	7,816	8,039	+2.85%
Creston	town	5,306	5,351	+0.85%
Nakusp	village	1,569	1,605	+2.29%
Salmo	village	1,139	1,141	+0.18%
Kaslo	village	1,031	968	-6.11%
New Denver	village	504	473	-6.15%
Slocan	village	296	272	-8.11%
Silverton	village	195	195	±0.00%

== Unincorporated communities ==
Community	Population 2011	Population 2016	Change
Wynndel (Parts A+B)	542	597	+10.15%
Ymir	245	231	-5.71%
Erickson	unknown	unknown	N/A
Lister	unknown	unknown	N/A
Krestova	unknown	unknown	N/A
