= Drinnan Peak =

Mountain in British Columbia, Canada

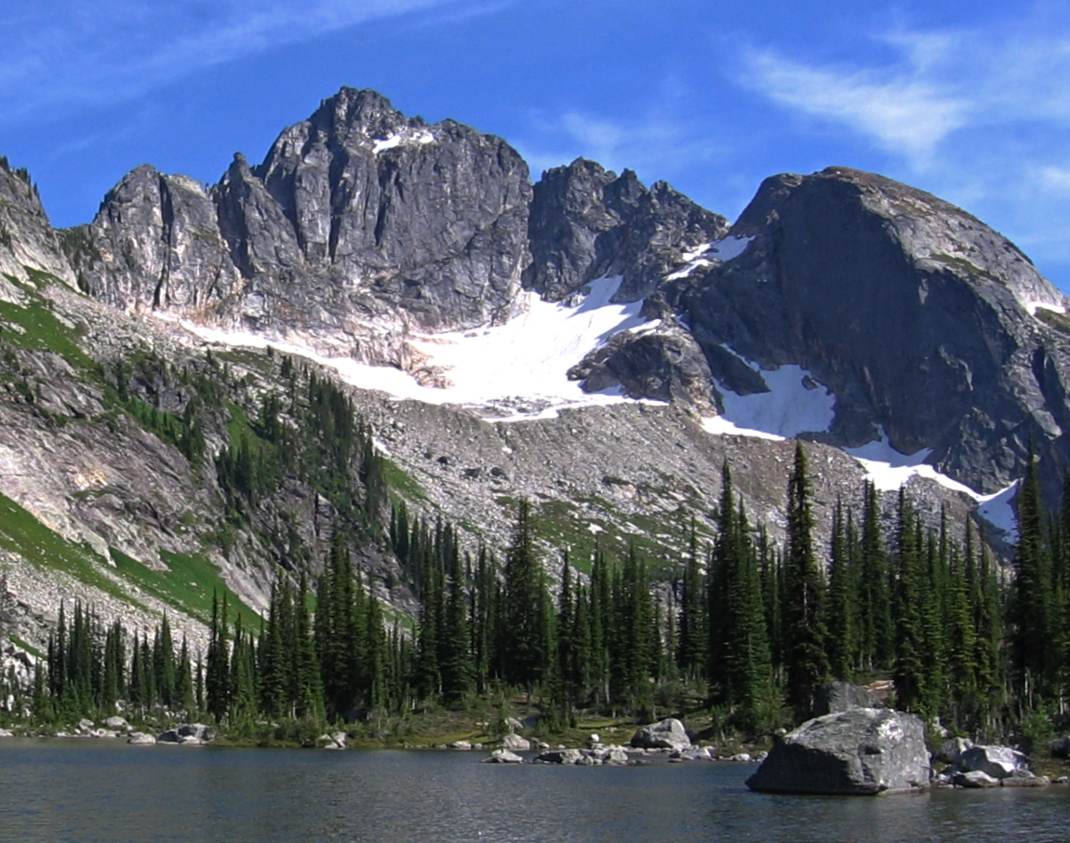
- Drinnan Peak, northwest aspect

Highest point
- Elevation: 2,584 m (8,478 ft)
- Prominence: 154 m (505 ft)
- Parent peak: Mount Prestley (2732 m)
- Listing: Mountains of British Columbia
- Coordinates: 49°47′16″N 117°42′44″W

Geography
- Location within British Columbia Location within Canada
- Location: Valhalla Provincial Park; British Columbia, Canada
- District: Kootenay Land District
- Parent range: Valhalla Ranges; Selkirk Mountains
- Topo map: NTS 82F13 Burton

Climbing
- First ascent: 1974 by Bob Dean, Janice Isaac, Kim Kratky, Peter Wood
- Easiest route: Scramble

Drinnan Peak is a 2,584-metre (8,478-foot) mountain summit located in the Valhalla Ranges of the Selkirk Mountains in southeast British Columbia, Canada. It is situated on the southwestern border of Valhalla Provincial Park, 2.8 km (1.7 mi) southeast of Gregorio Peak, and 18 km (11 mi) west of Slocan and Slocan Lake. The mountain is named for Bill Drinnan who trapped in the vicinity in the 1920s and 1930s. Drinnon Peak was adopted in 1976 in association with Drinnon Lake. To conform with the correct spelling of the family name, the spelling was changed to Drinnan Peak, and officially adopted February 3, 1986, by the Geographical Names Board of Canada.

Based on the Köppen climate classification, Drinnan Peak has a subarctic climate with cold, snowy winters, and mild summers. Temperatures can drop below −20 °C with wind chill factors below −30 °C. Precipitation runoff from the mountain drains into Gwillim Creek and Hoder Creek, both tributaries of the Slocan River. Its nearest higher peak is Mount Prestley, 2 km (1.2 mi) to the southeast. The first ascent of the peak was made August 19, 1974, by Bob Dean, Janice Isaac, Kim Kratky, and Peter Wood.

== See also ==
- Geography of British Columbia
