= Mount Prestley =

Mountain in British Columbia, Canada

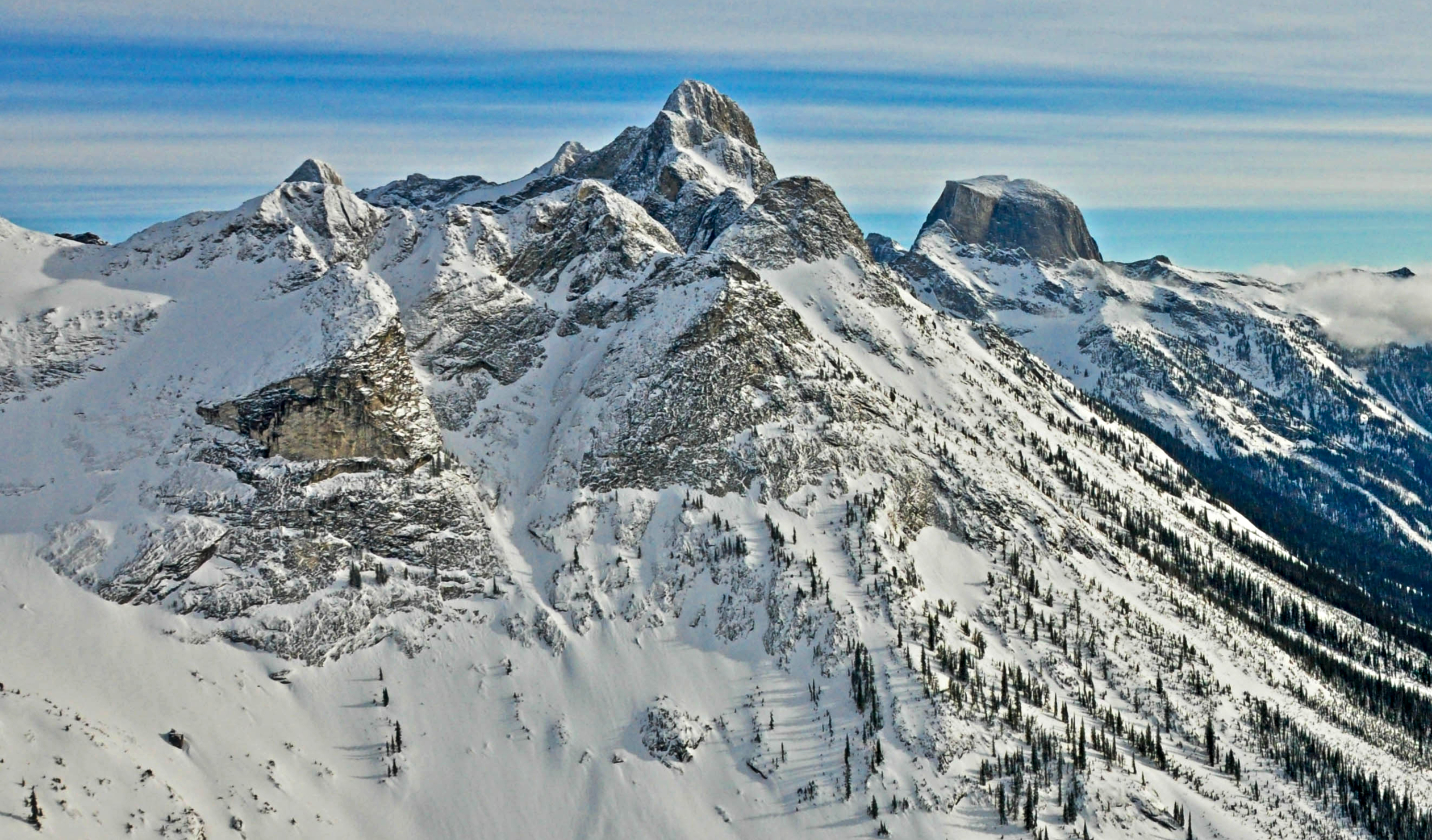
- Mount Prestley, west aspect (Gimli Peak to right)

Highest point
- Elevation: 2,732 m (8,963 ft)
- Prominence: 362 m (1,188 ft)
- Parent peak: Midgard Peak (2807 m)
- Listing: Mountains of British Columbia
- Coordinates: 49°46′33″N 117°41′20″W

Geography
- Location within British Columbia Location within Canada
- Interactive map of Mount Prestley
- Country: Canada
- Province: British Columbia
- District: Kootenay Land District
- Protected area: Valhalla Provincial Park
- Parent range: Valhalla Ranges; Selkirk Mountains
- Topo map: NTS 82F13 Burton

Climbing
- First ascent: August 6, 1969 by Iain Martin, Peter Renz, Frank Tarver
- Easiest route: Scrambling class 4

Mount Prestley is a 2,732-metre (8,963-foot) triple-summit mountain located in the Valhalla Ranges of the Selkirk Mountains in British Columbia, Canada. Mount Prestley is the eighth-highest point in the Valhalla Ranges, with the highest being Gladsheim Peak, 4.6 km (2.9 mi) to the east-northeast. Its nearest higher peak is Midgard Peak, 1.8 km (1.1 mi) to the east. It is situated on the southern border of Valhalla Provincial Park, and 16 km (9.9 mi) west of Slocan and Slocan Lake. The mountain's name was officially adopted January 24, 1962, by the Geographical Names Board of Canada. It honors Canadian Army Private Michael Thomas Patrick Prestley, from Nelson, BC. He was serving with The Black Watch (Royal Highland Regiment) of Canada when he was killed in World War II action July 22, 1944, at age 21.

Based on the Köppen climate classification, Mount Prestley has a subarctic climate with cold, snowy winters, and mild summers. Temperatures can drop below −20 °C with wind chill factors below −30 °C. The months July through September offer the most favorable weather for climbing Mount Prestley. Precipitation runoff from the mountain drains into tributaries of the Slocan River.

== Climbing routes ==
Established climbing routes on Mount Prestley:

- East Ridge - class 4 First ascent 1969
- Central West Ridge

== See also ==
- Geography of British Columbia
