= Asgard Peak =

Mountain in the country of Canada

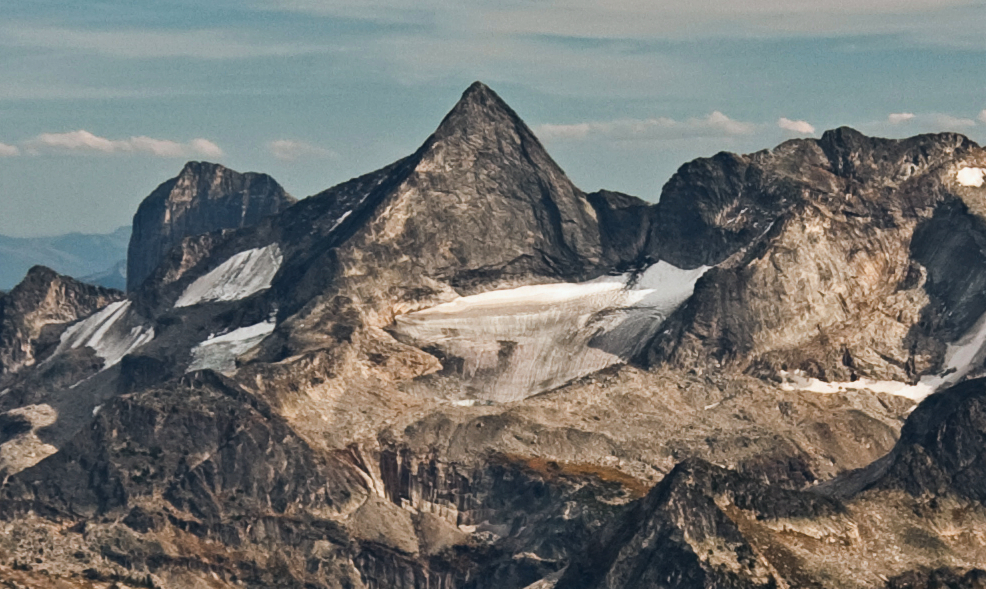
- Asgard Peak, north side with small glacier

Highest point
- Elevation: 2,825 m (9,268 ft)
- Prominence: 275 m (902 ft)
- Parent peak: Gladsheim Peak (2830 m)
- Listing: Mountains of British Columbia
- Coordinates: 49°47′03″N 117°39′24″W

Geography
- Location within British Columbia Location within Canada
- Interactive map of Asgard Peak
- Location: Valhalla Provincial Park; British Columbia, Canada
- District: Kootenay Land District
- Parent range: Valhalla Ranges; Selkirk Mountains
- Topo map: NTS 82F13 Burton

Geology
- Rock type: Granitic

Climbing
- Easiest route: East Ridge class 3

Asgard Peak is a 2,825-metre (9,268-foot) mountain summit located in the Valhalla Ranges of the Selkirk Mountains in British Columbia, Canada. Asgard Peak is the second-highest point in the Valhalla Ranges, with the highest being Gladsheim Peak, 2.1 km (1.3 mi) to the east. It is situated in the southern part of Valhalla Provincial Park, 6 km (3.7 mi) south of Devils Couch, and 13 km (8.1 mi) west of Slocan and Slocan Lake. The name "Valhalla Mountains" first appeared in George Mercer Dawson's Geological Survey of Canada map published in 1890. Dawson applied names derived from Scandinavian mythology to several of the mountain ranges and peaks in Southern Kootenay. In keeping with the Valhalla theme, this peak's name was submitted February 1970 by Robert Dean of the Kootenay Mountaineering Club for consideration, and it was officially adopted March 3, 1971, by the Geographical Names Board of Canada. Asgard, according to Norse mythology, is the section of Valhalla where the twelve gods dwell. Based on the Köppen climate classification, Asgard Peak has a subarctic climate with cold, snowy winters, and mild summers. This climate supports a small glacier on the peak's north slope. Temperatures can drop below −20 °C with wind chill factors below −30 °C. Precipitation runoff from the mountain drains into tributaries of the Slocan River.

== Climbing Routes ==
Established climbing routes on Asgard Peak:

- East Ridge - class 3
- West Ridge - class 5.5
- Southwest Ridge - class 5.7 First ascent 1927
- Southeast Ridge - class 5.7
- North Ridge - class 5.7
- South Face Left - class 5.8
- South Face Center - class 5.8
- South Face Right - class 5.11c

== See also ==
- Geography of British Columbia
