= Gimli (mountain) =

Gimli Mountain, 2744m, Canada

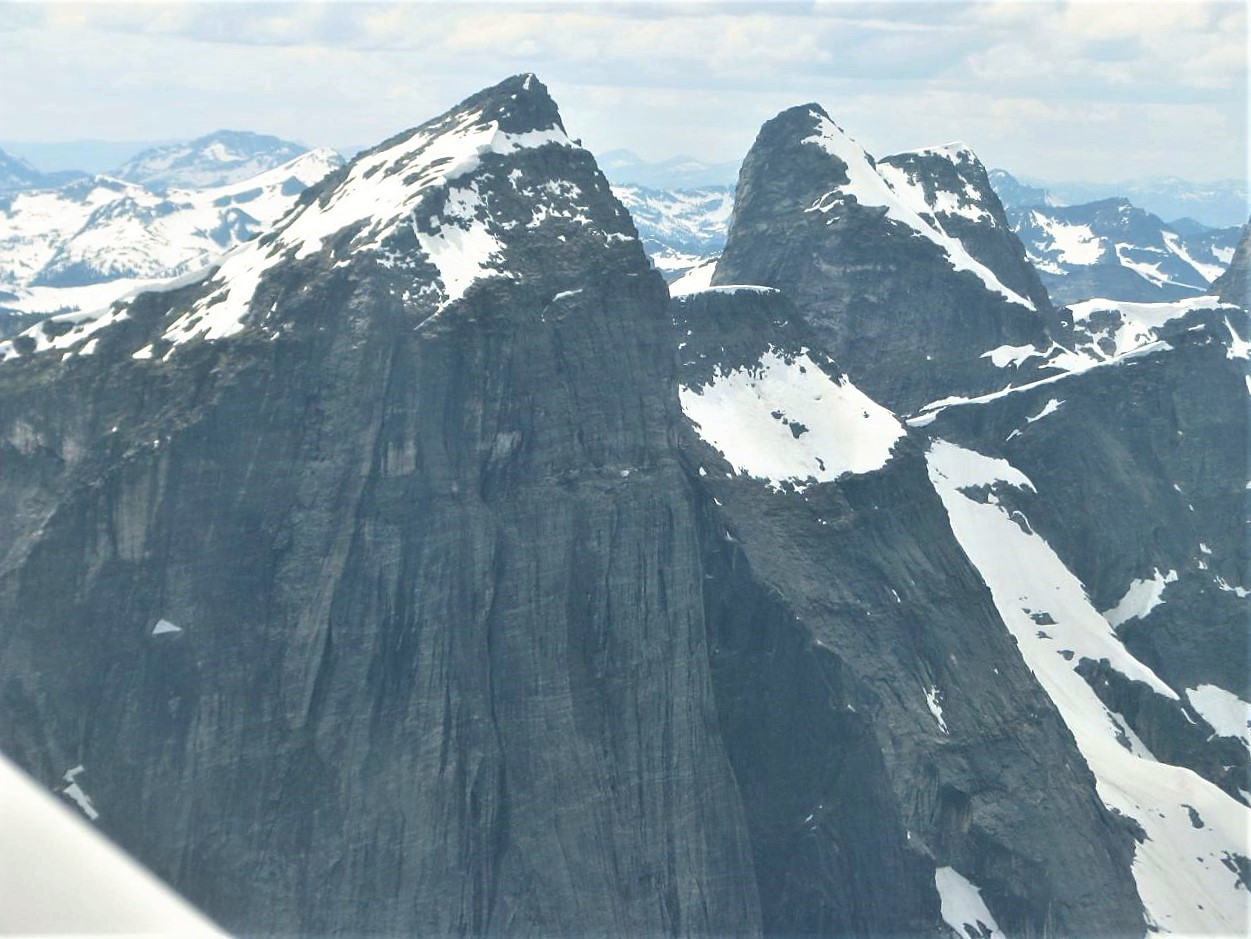
- Gimli (left) and Wolf's Ears (right); Aerial view from northeast

Highest point
- Elevation: 2,744 m (9,003 ft)
- Prominence: 204 m (669 ft)
- Parent peak: Gimli Peak (2,806 m)
- Isolation: 2.52 km (1.57 mi)
- Listing: Mountains of British Columbia
- Coordinates: 49°45′58″N 117°36′33″W

Geography
- Location within British Columbia Location within Canada
- Interactive map of Gimli
- Country: Canada
- Province: British Columbia
- District: Kootenay Land District
- Protected area: Valhalla Provincial Park
- Parent range: Valhalla Ranges; Selkirk Mountains
- Topo map: NTS 82F13 Burton

Geology
- Rock type: Gneiss

Gimli is a 2,744-metre (9,003 ft) mountain summit located in the Valhalla Ranges of the Selkirk Mountains in British Columbia, Canada. Gimli is the sixth-highest point in the Valhalla Ranges, with the highest being Gladsheim Peak, 2 km (1.2 mi) to the north-northwest. It is situated in southern Valhalla Provincial Park, 2.5 km (1.6 mi) east of Gimli Peak, and 10 km (6.2 mi) west of Slocan and Slocan Lake. Gimli is more notable for its steep rise above local terrain than for its absolute elevation as topographic relief is significant with the summit rising 1,500 meters (4,920 ft) above Mulvey Creek in 1.5 km (0.93 mi).

== History ==
The name "Valhalla Mountains" first appeared in George Mercer Dawson's Geological Survey of Canada map published in 1890. Dawson applied names derived from Scandinavian mythology to several of the mountain ranges and peaks in Southern Kootenay. This landform's toponym was officially adopted as "Mount Dag" on March 3, 1971, at the request of the Kootenay Mountaineering Club, but it was officially changed to Gimli on April 29, 1998, by the Geographical Names Board of Canada at the request of local residents. According to Norse mythology, Gimli is the place where the righteous survivors of Ragnarök (doomsday when heaven and earth are destroyed) are foretold to live.

== Climate ==
Based on the Köppen climate classification, Gimli has a subarctic climate with cold, snowy winters, and mild summers. Winter temperatures can drop below −20 °C with wind chill factors below −30 °C. Precipitation runoff from the mountain drains into tributaries of the Slocan River.

== See also ==
- List of mountains in Canada
- Geography of British Columbia
