= Black Prince Mountain =

Mountain in British Columbia, Canada

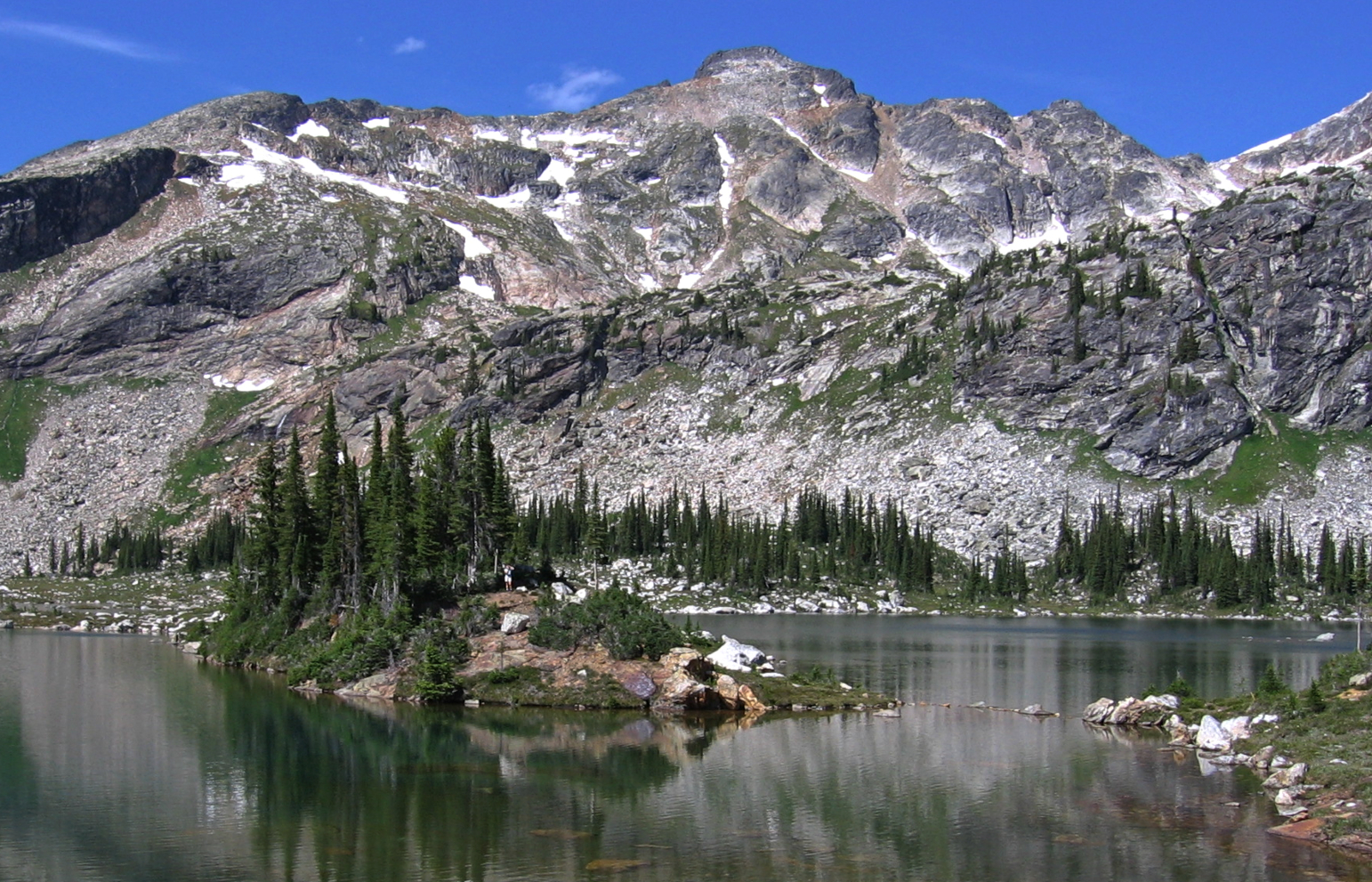
- Black Prince Mountain, south aspect

Highest point
- Elevation: 2,742 m (8,996 ft)
- Prominence: 52 m (171 ft)
- Parent peak: Mount Buri (2789 m)
- Listing: Mountains of British Columbia
- Coordinates: 49°49′39″N 117°44′39″W

Geography
- Location within British Columbia Location within Canada
- Interactive map of Black Prince Mountain
- Location: Valhalla Provincial Park; British Columbia, Canada
- Parent range: Valhalla Ranges; Selkirk Mountains
- Topo map: NTS 82F13 Burton

Climbing
- First ascent: 1975 by R. Anderson, S. Baker, V. Joseph, P. Wood
- Easiest route: Southwest Ridge class 2

Black Prince Mountain is a 2,742-metre (8,996-foot) mountain summit located in the Valhalla Ranges of the Selkirk Mountains in southeast British Columbia, Canada. It is situated in western Valhalla Provincial Park, 1 km (0.62 mi) west-northwest of Lucifer Peak, 19 km (12 mi) west of Slocan Lake, and 21 km (13 mi) west-northwest of Slocan. This peak's name refers to the Prince of Darkness and has not been officially adopted. The peak is located in Devils Range, which is a subrange of the Valhallas. The names of the peaks of this small compact range have a devil-related theme: Lucifer Peak, Mount Mephistopheles, Devils Dome, Mount Diablo, Satan Peak, Devils Spire, and Devils Couch.

Based on the Köppen climate classification, Black Prince Mountain has a subarctic climate with cold, snowy winters, and mild summers. Temperatures can drop below −20 °C with wind chill factors below −30 °C. Precipitation runoff from the mountain drains into Gwillim Creek and Evans Creek, both tributaries of the Slocan River. The first ascent of the peak was made in 1975 by R. Anderson, S. Baker, V. Joseph, and Peter Wood via the southwest ridge.

== See also ==
- Geography of British Columbia
