= Gregorio Peak =

Mountain in British Columbia, Canada

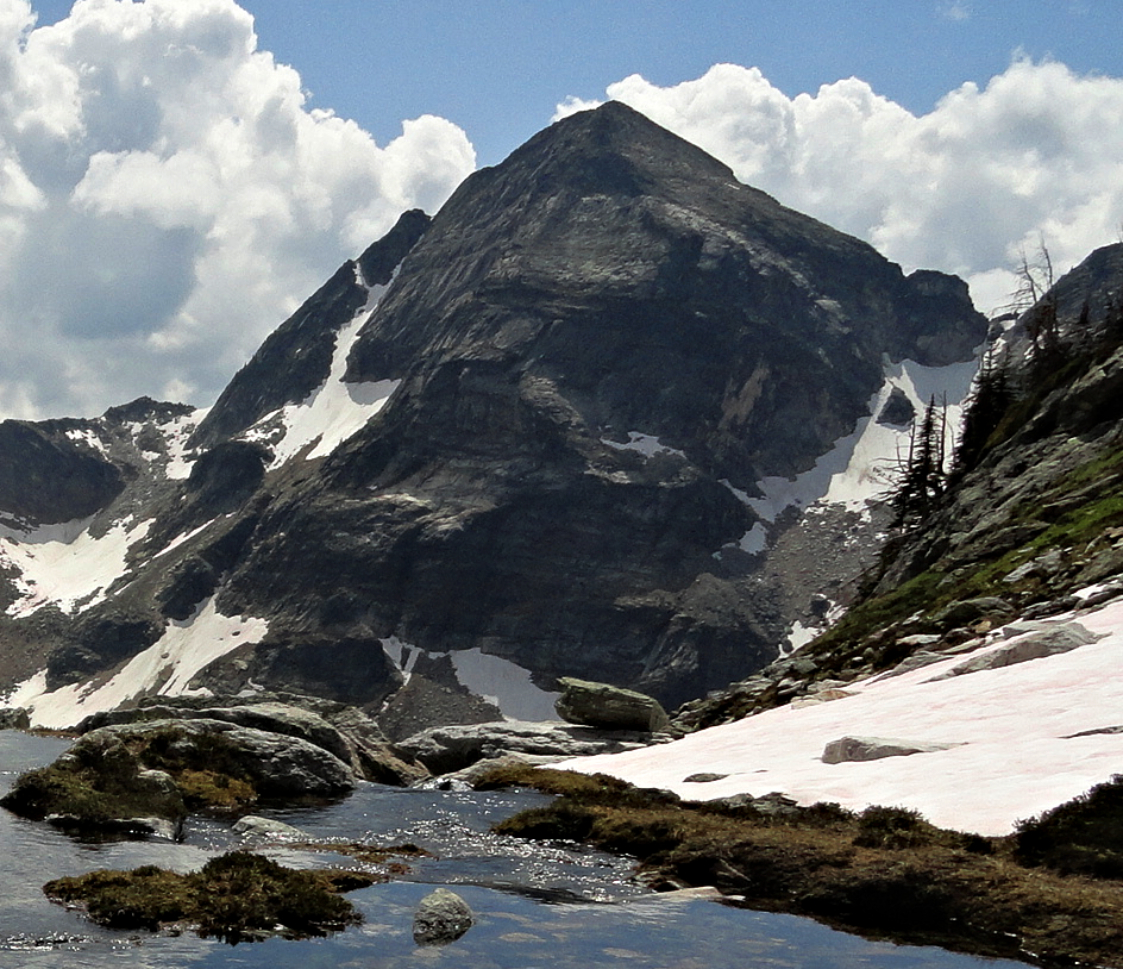
- Gregorio Peak, north aspect

Highest point
- Elevation: 2,605 m (8,547 ft)
- Prominence: 255 m (837 ft)
- Parent peak: Black Prince Mountain (2742 m)
- Listing: Mountains of British Columbia
- Coordinates: 49°47′59″N 117°44′46″W

Geography
- Location within British Columbia Location within Canada
- Location: Valhalla Provincial Park; British Columbia, Canada
- District: Kootenay Land District
- Parent range: Valhalla Ranges; Selkirk Mountains
- Topo map: NTS 82F13 Burton

Geology
- Rock type: Gneiss

Climbing
- First ascent: 1970 by Bob Dean, Howie Ridge
- Easiest route: Southeast Ridge class 3

Gregorio Peak is a 2,605-metre (8,547-foot) mountain summit located in the Valhalla Ranges of the Selkirk Mountains in British Columbia, Canada. It is situated on the southwestern border of Valhalla Provincial Park, 8.7 km (5.4 mi) west of Gladsheim Peak, and 19 km (12 mi) west of Slocan and Slocan Lake. The mountain's name commemorates Michael Gregory Peak, a resident of the Slocan area known to his friends as Gregorio, who drowned in a canoeing accident on Slocan Lake in 1971 returning from a climb of nearby Devils Couch, leaving behind his wife Colleen Kelly and their unborn son, Dag Peak, named after nearby Mt. Dag. This peak's name was submitted by Anthony Eweson of New Denver for consideration, and it was officially adopted March 4, 1974, by the Geographical Names Board of Canada.

Based on the Köppen climate classification, Gregorio Peak has a subarctic climate with cold, snowy winters, and mild summers. Temperatures can drop below −20 °C with wind chill factors below −30 °C. Precipitation runoff from the mountain drains into Gwillim Creek and Hoder Creek, both tributaries of the Slocan River. Its nearest higher peak is Lucifer Peak, 2.8 km (1.7 mi) to the north-northeast. The first ascent of the peak was made August 25, 1970, by Bob Dean and Howie Ridge.

== See also ==
- Geography of British Columbia
