= Midgard Peak =

Mountain in British Columbia, Canada

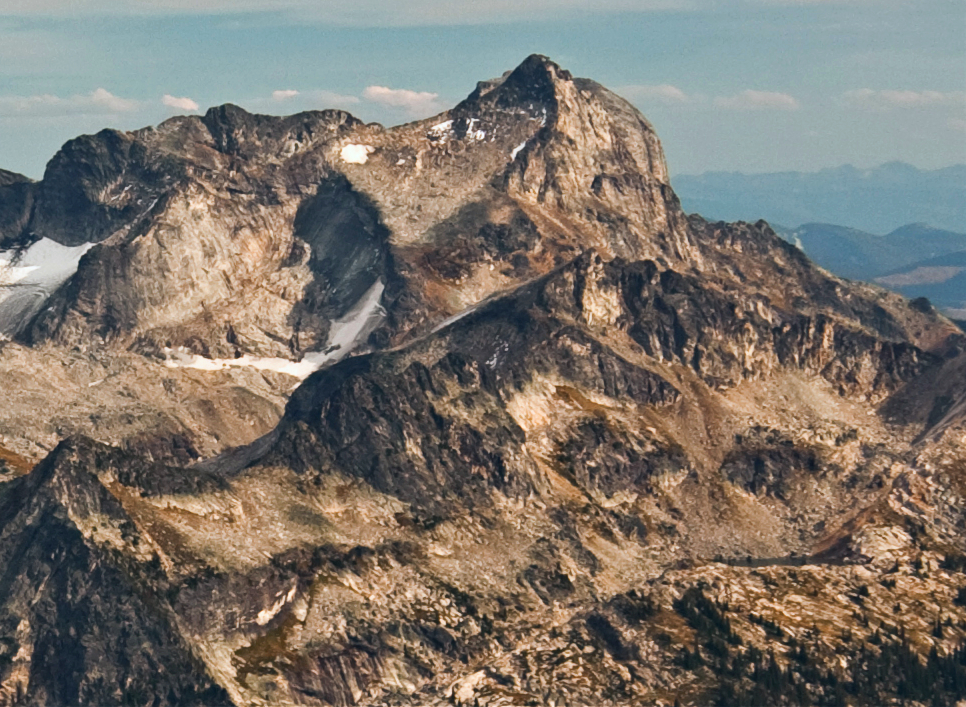
- Midgard Peak, north aspect

Highest point
- Elevation: 2,807 m (9,209 ft)
- Prominence: 137 m (449 ft)
- Parent peak: Asgard Peak (2,825 m)
- Listing: Mountains of British Columbia
- Coordinates: 49°46′40″N 117°39′54″W

Geography
- Location within British Columbia Location within Canada
- Interactive map of Midgard Peak
- Location: Valhalla Provincial Park; British Columbia, Canada
- District: Kootenay Land District
- Parent range: Valhalla Ranges; Selkirk Mountains
- Topo map: NTS 82F13 Burton

Geology
- Rock type: Granitic

Climbing
- Easiest route: Scramble class 3

Midgard Peak is a 2,807-metre (9,209-foot) mountain summit located in the Valhalla Ranges of the Selkirk Mountains in British Columbia, Canada. Midgard Peak is the third-highest point in the Valhalla Ranges, with the highest being Gladsheim Peak, 2.9 km (1.8 mi) to the east-northeast. The nearest higher neighbor is Asgard Peak, 0.9 km (0.56 mi) to the northeast. It is situated on the southern border of Valhalla Provincial Park, 1.1 km (0.68 mi) northwest of Gimli Peak, and 14 km (8.7 mi) west of Slocan and Slocan Lake.

== Etymology ==
The name "Valhalla Mountains" first appeared in George Mercer Dawson's Geological Survey of Canada map published in 1890. Dawson applied names derived from Scandinavian mythology to several of the mountain ranges and peaks in Southern Kootenay. In keeping with the Valhalla theme, this peak's name was submitted February 1970 by Robert Dean of the Kootenay Mountaineering Club for consideration, and the toponym was officially adopted March 3, 1971, by the Geographical Names Board of Canada. According to Norse mythology, Midgard is the home of earth dwellers.

== Climate ==
Based on the Köppen climate classification, Midgard Peak has a subarctic climate with cold, snowy winters, and mild summers. Winter temperatures can drop below −20 °C with wind chill factors below −30 °C. Precipitation runoff from the mountain drains into tributaries of the Slocan River.

== Climbing Routes ==
Established climbing routes on Midgard Peak:

- North Ridge - class 3 First ascent 1973
- South Ridge - class 3

== Gallery ==
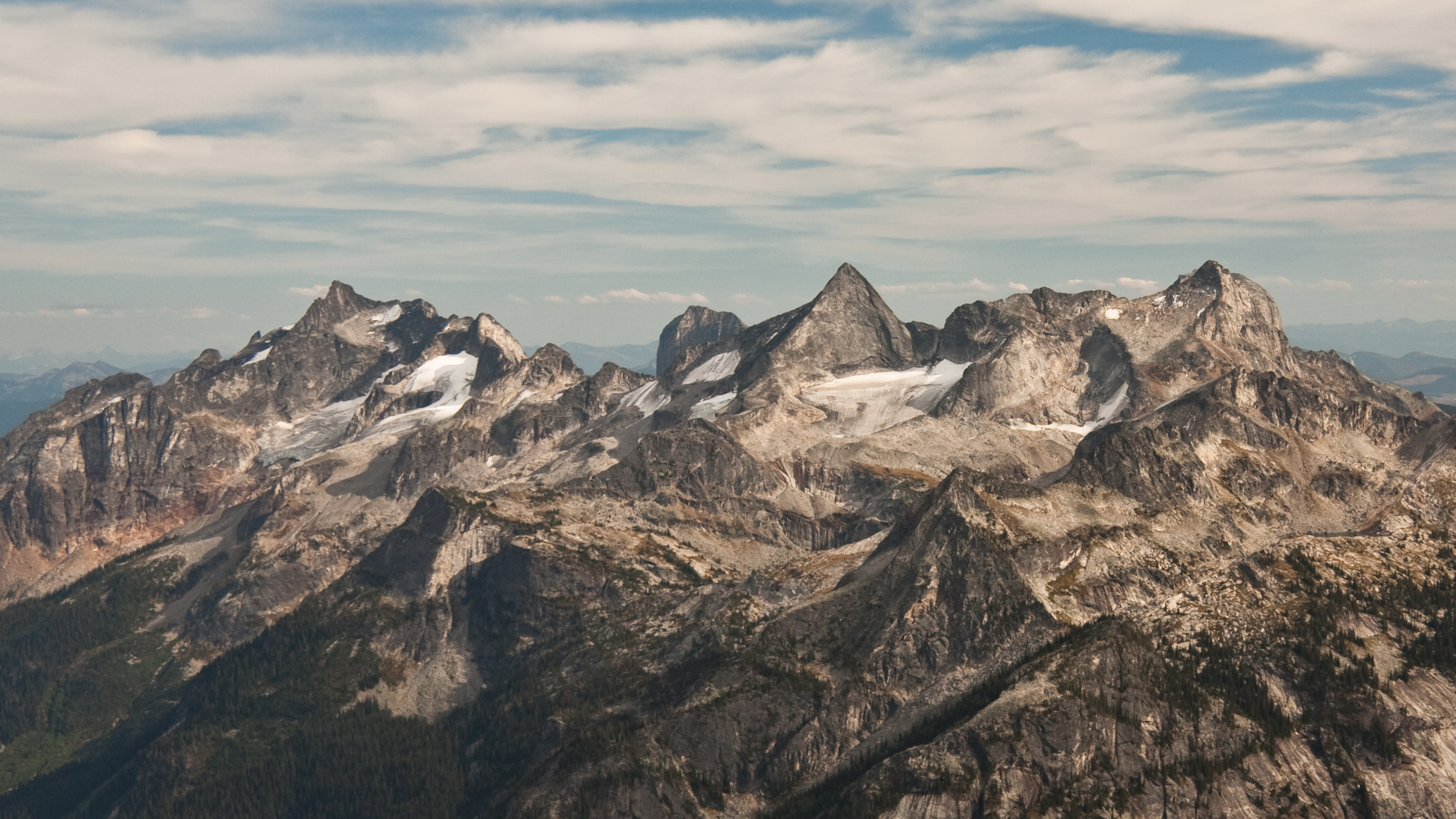
L→R: Gladsheim, Asgard, Midgard

== See also ==
- Geography of British Columbia
