= Mount Denver =

Mountain in British Columbia, Canada

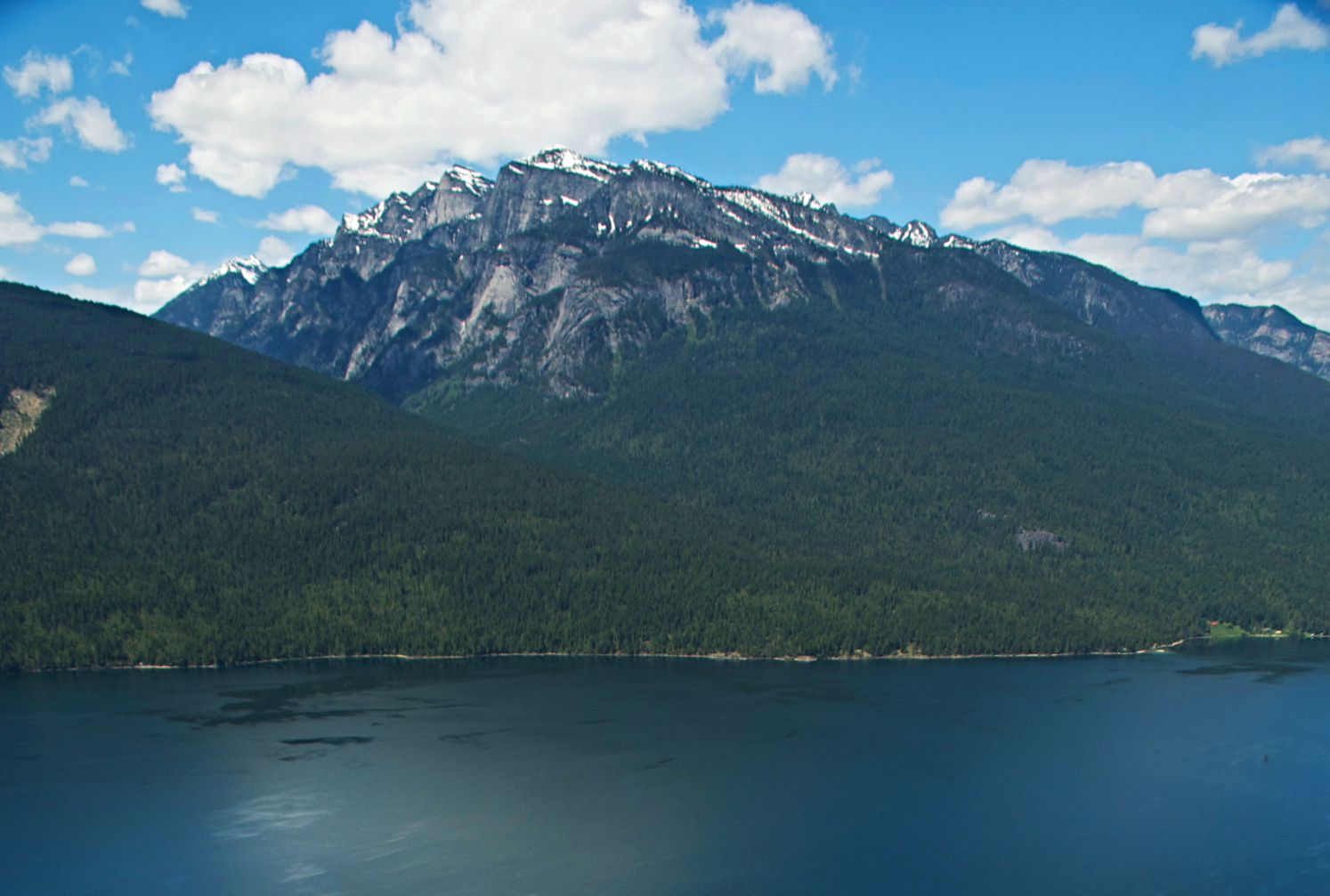
- Mount Denver, southeast aspect

Highest point
- Elevation: 2,746 m (9,009 ft)
- Prominence: 641 m (2,103 ft)
- Parent peak: Mount Buri (2789 m)
- Listing: Mountains of British Columbia
- Coordinates: 49°57′30″N 117°30′48″W

Geography
- Location within British Columbia Location within Canada
- Interactive map of Mount Denver
- Location: Valhalla Provincial Park; British Columbia, Canada
- District: Kootenay Land District
- Parent range: Valhalla Ranges; Selkirk Mountains
- Topo map: NTS 82F13 Burton

Mount Denver is a 2,746-metre (9,009-foot) mountain summit located in the Valhalla Ranges of the Selkirk Mountains in southeast British Columbia, Canada. It is situated in northern Valhalla Provincial Park, 9 km (5.6 mi) west of Slocan Lake, and 11 km (6.8 mi) west-southwest of New Denver. The mountain takes its name from New Denver, which in turn is named after Denver, Colorado. This mountain's name was officially adopted March 31, 1924, by the Geographical Names Board of Canada.

Based on the Köppen climate classification, Mount Denver has a subarctic climate with cold, snowy winters, and mild summers. Temperatures can drop below −20 °C with wind chill factors below −30 °C. Precipitation runoff from the mountain and meltwater from the New Denver Glacier on the north slope drains into tributaries of the Slocan River.

== See also ==
- Geography of British Columbia
