= Lucifer Peak =

Mountain in British Columbia, Canada

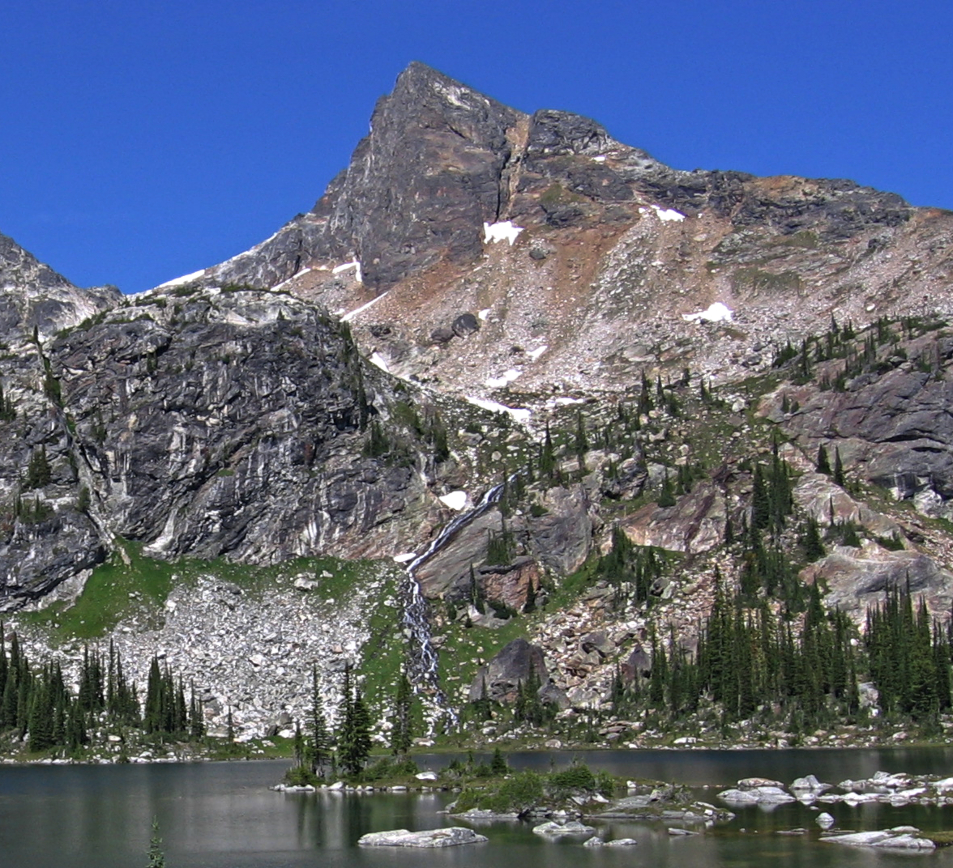
- Lucifer Peak, south aspect

Highest point
- Elevation: 2,726 m (8,944 ft)
- Prominence: 116 m (381 ft)
- Parent peak: Devils Dome (2769 m)
- Listing: Mountains of British Columbia
- Coordinates: 49°49′28″N 117°44′04″W

Geography
- Location within British Columbia Location within Canada
- Interactive map of Lucifer Peak
- Country: Canada
- Province: British Columbia
- District: Kootenay Land District
- Protected area: Valhalla Provincial Park
- Parent range: Valhalla Ranges; Selkirk Mountains
- Topo map: NTS 82F13 Burton

Climbing
- First ascent: 1970 by Bob Dean, Howie Ridge

Lucifer Peak is a 2,726-metre (8,944-foot) mountain summit located in the Valhalla Ranges of the Selkirk Mountains in southeast British Columbia, Canada. It is situated in western Valhalla Provincial Park, 8.8 km (5.5 mi) west-northwest of Gladsheim Peak, 18 km (11 mi) west of Slocan Lake, and 20 km (12 mi) west-northwest of Slocan. This peak's name was officially adopted July 26, 1977, by the Geographical Names Board of Canada. The peak is located in Devils Range, which is a subrange of the Valhallas. The names of the peaks of this small compact range have a devil-related theme: Black Prince Mountain, Mount Mephistopheles, Devils Dome, Mount Diablo, Satan Peak, Devils Spire, and Devils Couch.

Based on the Köppen climate classification, Lucifer Peak has a subarctic climate with cold, snowy winters, and mild summers. Temperatures can drop below −20 °C with wind chill factors below −30 °C. Precipitation runoff from the mountain drains into Gwillim Creek and Evans Creek, both tributaries of the Slocan River.

== Climbing ==
The first ascent of the peak was made August 24, 1970, by Bob Dean and Howie Ridge via the east ridge.

Established climbing routes on Lucifer Peak:

- East Ridge - class 3 First Ascent 1970
- Northwest Ridge - class 5.3 FA 1980
- Southwest Face - class 5.4 FA 1983

== Gallery ==
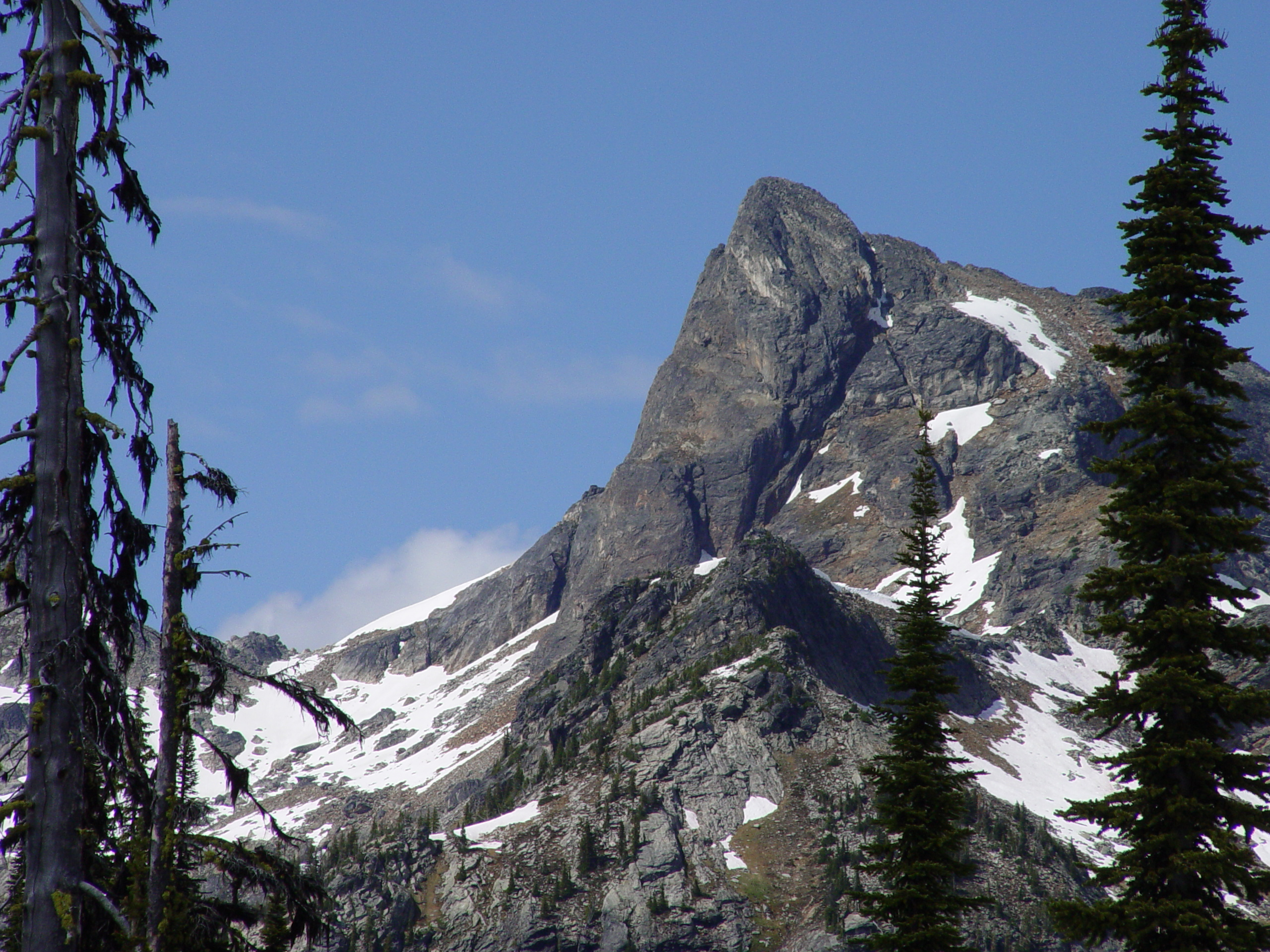
Lucifer Peak in Devils Range

== See also ==
- Geography of British Columbia
