= Gimli Peak =

Mountain in the country of Canada

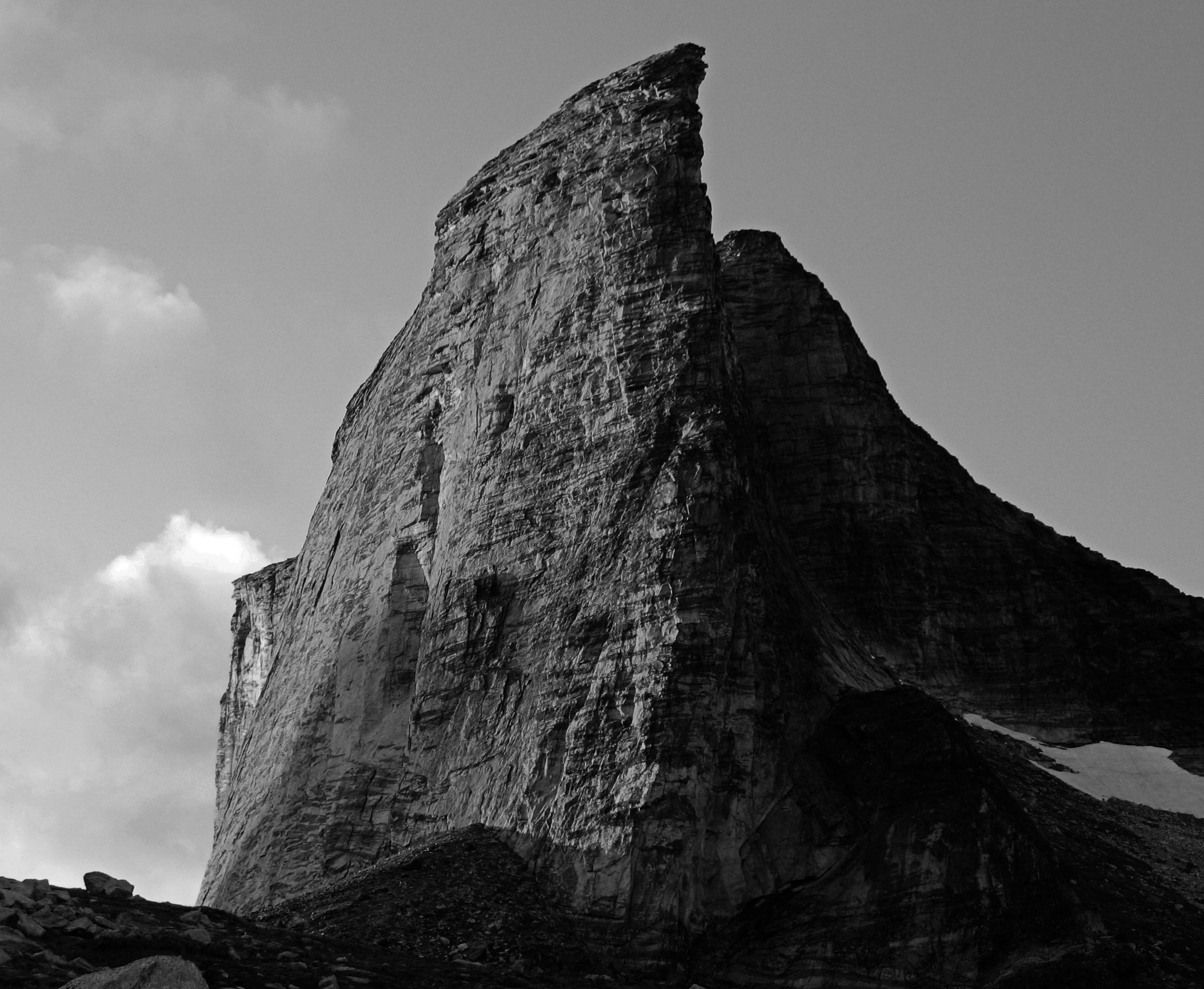
- Gimli Peak, south aspect

Highest point
- Elevation: 2,806 m (9,206 ft)
- Prominence: 356 m (1,168 ft)
- Parent peak: Midgard Peak (2807 m)
- Listing: Mountains of British Columbia
- Coordinates: 49°45′58″N 117°38′49″W

Geography
- Location within British Columbia Location within Canada
- Interactive map of Gimli Peak
- Location: Valhalla Provincial Park; British Columbia, Canada
- District: Kootenay Land District
- Parent range: Valhalla Ranges; Selkirk Mountains
- Topo map: NTS 82F13 Burton

Geology
- Rock type: Gneiss

Climbing
- First ascent: 1963 by H. Butling, D. Deane, K. Dean, M. Stewart, P. Williams
- Easiest route: East Ridge Scrambling class 3

Gimli Peak is a 2,806-metre (9,206 ft) mountain summit located in the Valhalla Ranges of the Selkirk Mountains in British Columbia, Canada. Gimli Peak is the fourth-highest point in the Valhalla Ranges, with the highest being Gladsheim Peak, 2.7 km (1.7 mi) to the north. Its nearest higher peak is Midgard Peak, 1.8 km (1.1 mi) to the northwest. It is situated in southern Valhalla Provincial Park, immediately southwest of Mulvey Lakes, and 12 km (7.5 mi) west of Slocan and Slocan Lake. The name "Valhalla Mountains" first appeared in George Mercer Dawson's Geological Survey of Canada map published in 1890. Dawson applied names derived from Scandinavian mythology to several of the mountain ranges and peaks in Southern Kootenay. In keeping with the Valhalla theme, this peak was originally labelled "Mount Gimli" on a 1900 Geological Survey of Canada publication, and it was officially adopted April 29, 1998, by the Geographical Names Board of Canada as Gimli Peak. According to Norse mythology, Gimli is the place where the righteous survivors of Ragnarök (doomsday when heaven and earth are destroyed) are foretold to live. Based on the Köppen climate classification, Gimli Peak has a subarctic climate with cold, snowy winters, and mild summers. Winter temperatures can drop below −20 °C with wind chill factors below −30 °C. Precipitation runoff from the mountain drains into tributaries of the Slocan River.

== Climbing Routes ==
Established climbing routes on Gimli Peak:

- East Ridge - class 3 First ascent 1963
- Northeast Ridge - class 5.6 FA 1969
- South Ridge - class 5.9
- Northwest Buttress - class 5.8
- Northeast Buttress/North Ridge - class 5.6
- East Face - class 5.7
- Space Buttress, West Face - class 5.12d
- Lusting After Women, SW Face - class 5.10c
- Slave to Gravity, SW Face - class 5.12-
- Licken It, East Face - class 5.11a
- Sailor Jerry - class 5.10b/c

The classic South Ridge is listed in climbing legend Fred Beckey's book, 100 Favorite North American Climbs.

== See also ==
- Gimli (mountain)
- List of mountains of Canada
- Geography of British Columbia
