= Devils Dome =

Mountain in British Columbia, Canada

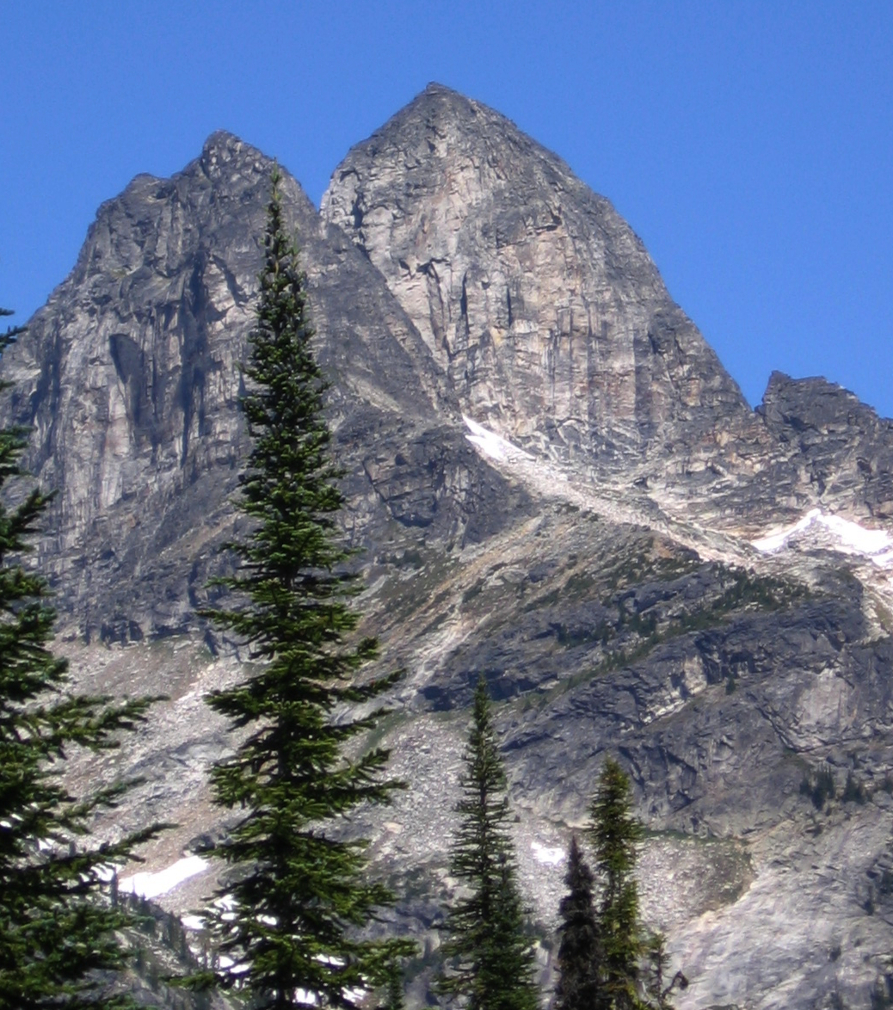
- Devils Dome, south aspect

Highest point
- Elevation: 2,769 m (9,085 ft)
- Prominence: 219 m (719 ft)
- Parent peak: Mount Buri (2,789 m)
- Listing: Mountains of British Columbia
- Coordinates: 49°49′41″N 117°42′51″W

Geography
- Location within British Columbia Location within Canada
- Interactive map of Devils Dome
- Location: Valhalla Provincial Park; British Columbia, Canada
- District: Kootenay Land District
- Parent range: Valhalla Ranges; Selkirk Mountains
- Topo map: NTS 82F13 Burton

Climbing
- First ascent: 1973 H. Ridge, P. Wood, G. Stein

Devils Dome is a 2,769-metre (9,085-foot) mountain summit located in the Valhalla Ranges of the Selkirk Mountains in southeast British Columbia, Canada. It is situated in western Valhalla Provincial Park, 1.5 km (0.93 mi) east of Lucifer Peak, 5 km (3.1 mi) west of Devils Couch, and 18 km (11 mi) west of Slocan and Slocan Lake. The peak is located in Devils Range, which is a subrange of the Valhallas. Devils Dome has a subpeak, unofficially called Dark Prince, 100 m (328 ft) to the west. The names of the peaks of this small compact range have a devil-related theme: Black Prince Mountain, Lucifer Peak, Mount Mephistopheles, Mount Diablo, Satan Peak, Devils Spire, and Devils Couch. This peak's name was submitted by Pat Ridge of the Kootenay Mountaineering Club and officially adopted July 27, 1977, by the Geographical Names Board of Canada. The first ascent of the peak was made in 1973 by Howie Ridge, Peter Wood, and G. Stein via the southeast ridge.

== Climate ==
Based on the Köppen climate classification, Devils Dome has a subarctic climate with cold, snowy winters, and mild summers. Winter temperatures can drop below −20 °C with wind chill factors below −30 °C. Precipitation runoff from the mountain drains into Gwillim Creek and Evans Creek, both tributaries of the Slocan River.

== Climbing Routes ==
Established climbing routes on Devils Dome:

- Southeast Ridge - class 5.6 First Ascent 1973
- South Face Couloir - class 5.6 FA 1977

== Gallery ==
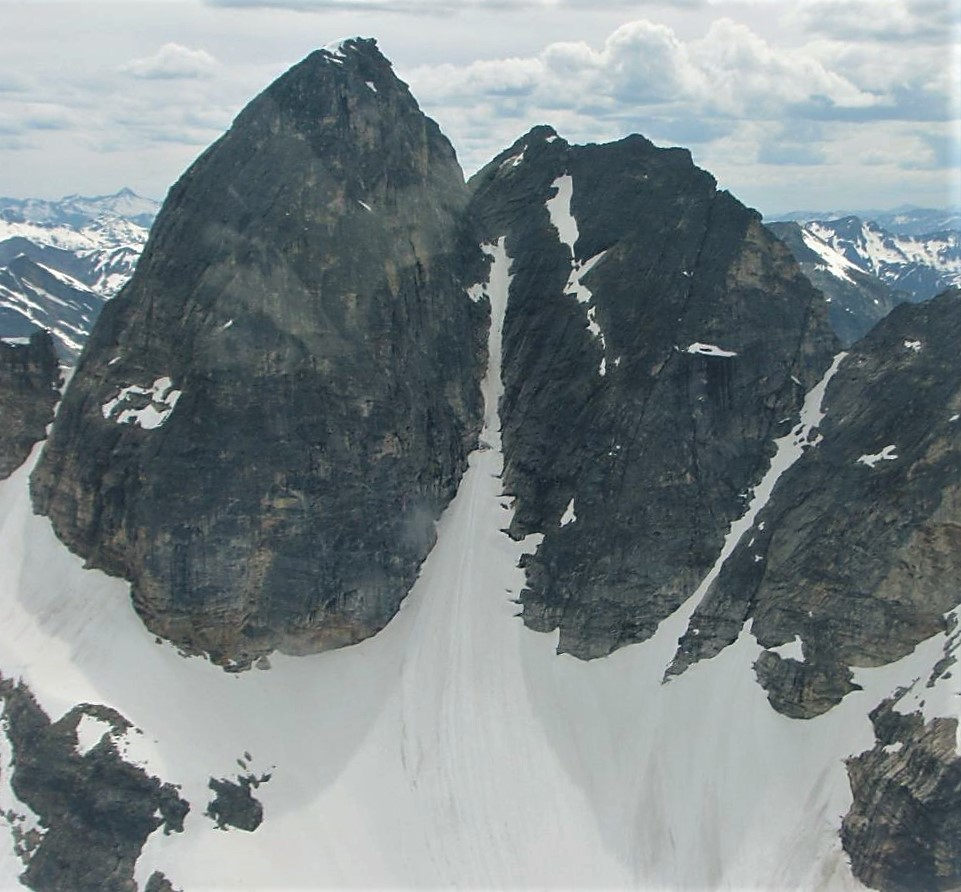
Aerial view of north aspect

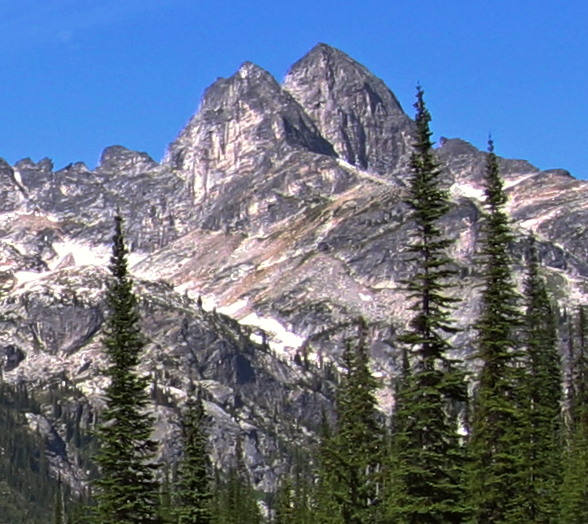
Devils Dome with subsidiary peak Dark Prince in front

== See also ==
- Geography of British Columbia
