= Devils Couch =

Mountain in British Columbia, Canada

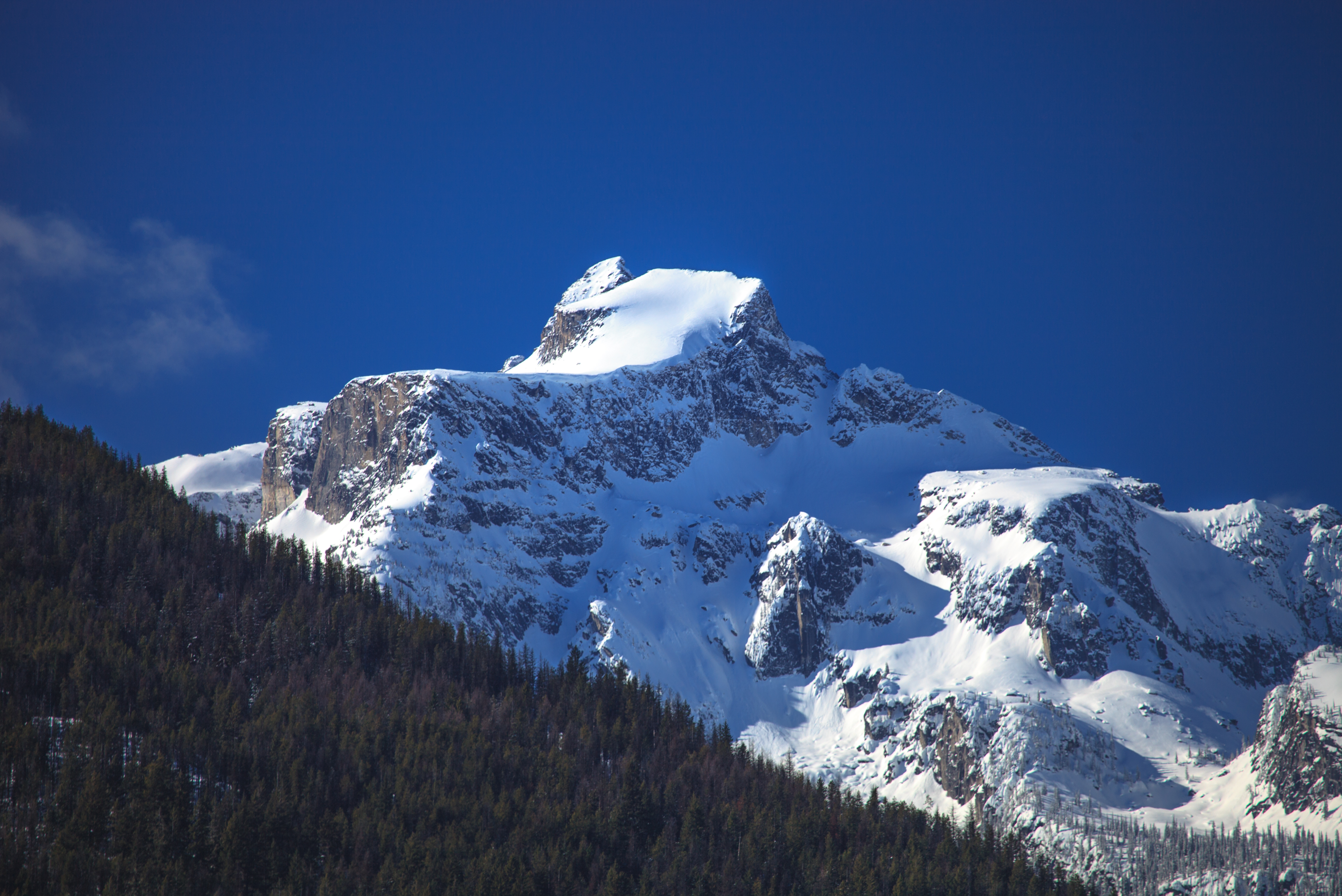
- Devils Couch, southeast aspect

Highest point
- Elevation: 2,749 m (9,019 ft)
- Prominence: 299 m (981 ft)
- Parent peak: Devils Dome (2769 m)
- Listing: Mountains of British Columbia
- Coordinates: 49°50′01″N 117°39′02″W

Geography
- Location within British Columbia Location within Canada
- Interactive map of Devils Couch
- Location: Valhalla Provincial Park; British Columbia, Canada
- District: Kootenay Land District
- Parent range: Valhalla Ranges; Selkirk Mountains
- Topo map: NTS 82F13 Burton

Devils Couch is a 2,749-metre (9,019-foot) mountain summit located in the Valhalla Ranges of the Selkirk Mountains in southeast British Columbia, Canada. It is situated in Valhalla Provincial Park, 5 km (3.1 mi) north of Gladsheim Peak, 12 km (7.5 mi) west of Slocan Lake, and 15 km (9.3 mi) northwest of Slocan. The mountain's descriptive name refers to its shape. It was first called "The Toboggan Slide" by early miners who arrived in the area in the 1890s. It was later called "King Tuts Couch" in the 1920s, coinciding with the archaeological discovery in Egypt. This peak's current name was officially adopted July 22, 1964, by the Geographical Names Board of Canada. The peak is located in Devils Range, which is a compact subrange of the Valhallas. The names of the neighboring peaks have a devil-related theme: Black Prince Mountain, Lucifer Peak, Mount Mephistopheles, Devils Dome, Mount Diablo, Satan Peak, and Devils Spire.

== Climate ==
Based on the Köppen climate classification, Devils Couch has a subarctic climate with cold, snowy winters, and mild summers. Winter temperatures can drop below −20 °C with wind chill factors below −30 °C. Precipitation runoff from the mountain drains into Gwillim Creek and Evans Creek, both tributaries of the Slocan River.

== Gallery ==
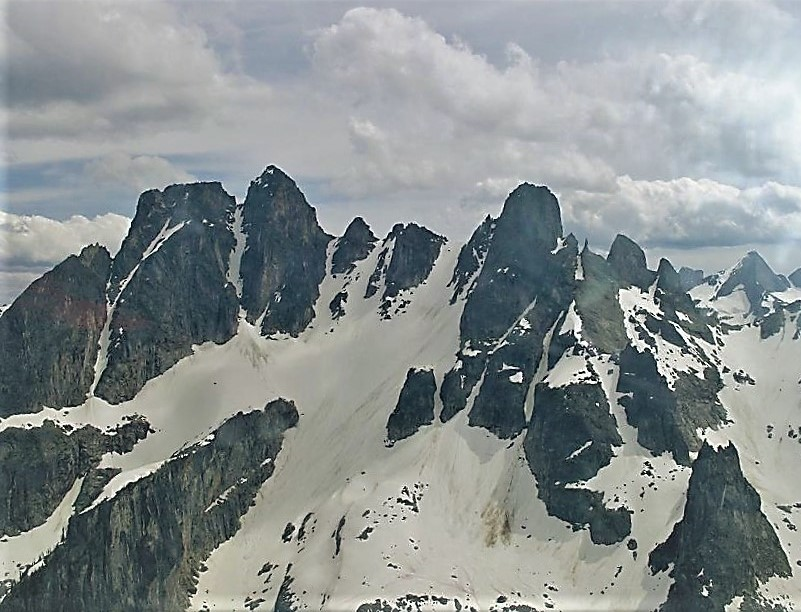
Aerial view of the north aspect of Devils Couch

== See also ==
- Geography of British Columbia
