= Gimli =

Gimli may refer to:

- Gimli, Manitoba, Canada
  - Rural Municipality of Gimli, Manitoba, Canada
  - Gimli (electoral district), a provincial electoral district in Manitoba
  - RCAF Station Gimli (1943–1971), former air force station near the town
  - Gimli Industrial Park Airport, current airport using part of the former air station
  - Gimli Glider, a famous emergency airplane landing at the former air station
- Gimli (Middle-earth), a fictional character in The Lord of the Rings
- Gimli (mountain), a mountain in British Columbia
- Gimli Peak, a mountain in Valhalla Provincial Park
- Gimli (cipher), a cryptographic permutation

== See also ==
- Gimlé, a "heaven" in Norse mythology
- Gimli Glider, nickname of a plane that landed in Gimli after running out of fuel
