= Ruby Range (Valhalla Ranges) =

Mountain range in British Columbia, Canada

- Ruby Mountains
- Location within British Columbia

Highest point
- Peak: Mount Niord
- Elevation: 2,688 m (8,819 ft)
- Prominence: 318 m (1,043 ft)

Geography
- Country: Canada
- Province: British Columbia
- Range coordinates: 50°6′N 117°38′W
- Parent range: Selkirk Mountains
- Topo map: NTS 82K4 Nakusp

The Ruby Range is a subrange of the Valhalla Ranges of the Selkirk Mountains of the Columbia Mountains in southeastern British Columbia, Canada, located west of the northern end of Slocan Lake.
