= Gimle (disambiguation) =

Gimlé is a place in Norse mythology.

Gimle may also refer to:

== People ==
- Trude Gimle (born 1974), a Norwegian alpine skier

== Places ==
- Gimle, Oslo, a neighborhood in the city of Oslo, Norway
- Gimle (Kristiansand), a neighborhood in the city of Kristiansand, Norway
- Gimle, Frederiksberg, a former community centre in Frederiksberg, Denmark
- The name Vidkun Quisling gave to his Villa Grande estate in Bygdøy, Norway
- A school, church, and cemetery in Albright, Alberta, Canada

== See also ==
- Gimli (disambiguation)
