= Colleen McCrory =

Canadian environmental activist

- Born: 1949/1950; New Denver, British Columbia
- Died: July 1, 2007; Silverton, British Columbia
- Occupation: Environmental activist
- Known for: Founded Valhalla Wilderness Society

Colleen McCrory (1949/1950 – July 1, 2007) was a Canadian environmental activist.

She was born in New Denver, British Columbia, by the light of a Coleman lantern to Patrick and Mabel McCrory. She was raised in New Denver with eight brother's and sisters. She had three children, Sean, Rory, and Shea. McCrory founded the Valhalla Wilderness Society, a British Columbia environmental group, in 1975.

McCrory funded her campaign at first through a small clothing store in New Denver. However, a three-year boycott by loggers forced her out of business in 1985 and forced her deep into debt.

She was awarded the Governor-General's Conservation Award in 1983 and the IUCN's Fred M. Packard Award in 1988. In 1992, she was named to the United Nations' Global 500 Roll of Honour and awarded a Goldman Environmental Prize. An old-growth forest lichen, Pertusaria mccroryae, was named in her honor in 2010.

She ran as a candidate for the Green Party in the 2001 British Columbia provincial elections.

McCrory's efforts helped lead to the creation of:

- Valhalla Provincial Park in the Kootenay region of British Columbia
- Gwaii Haanas National Park Reserve and Haida Heritage Site in Haida Gwaii
- Goat Range Provincial Park in the Selkirk Mountains
- Khutzeymateen Grizzly Bear Sanctuary and the Spirit Bear Conservancy in the Great Bear Rainforest on the central coast of British Columbia
- Incomappleux Conservancy in the Kootenay region of British Columbia (Part of the Selkirk Mountain Caribou Park proposal)

McCrory died of a brain tumor at home in Silverton, British Columbia, in 2007, aged 57.
