= Gladsheim Peak =

Mountain in British Columbia, Canada

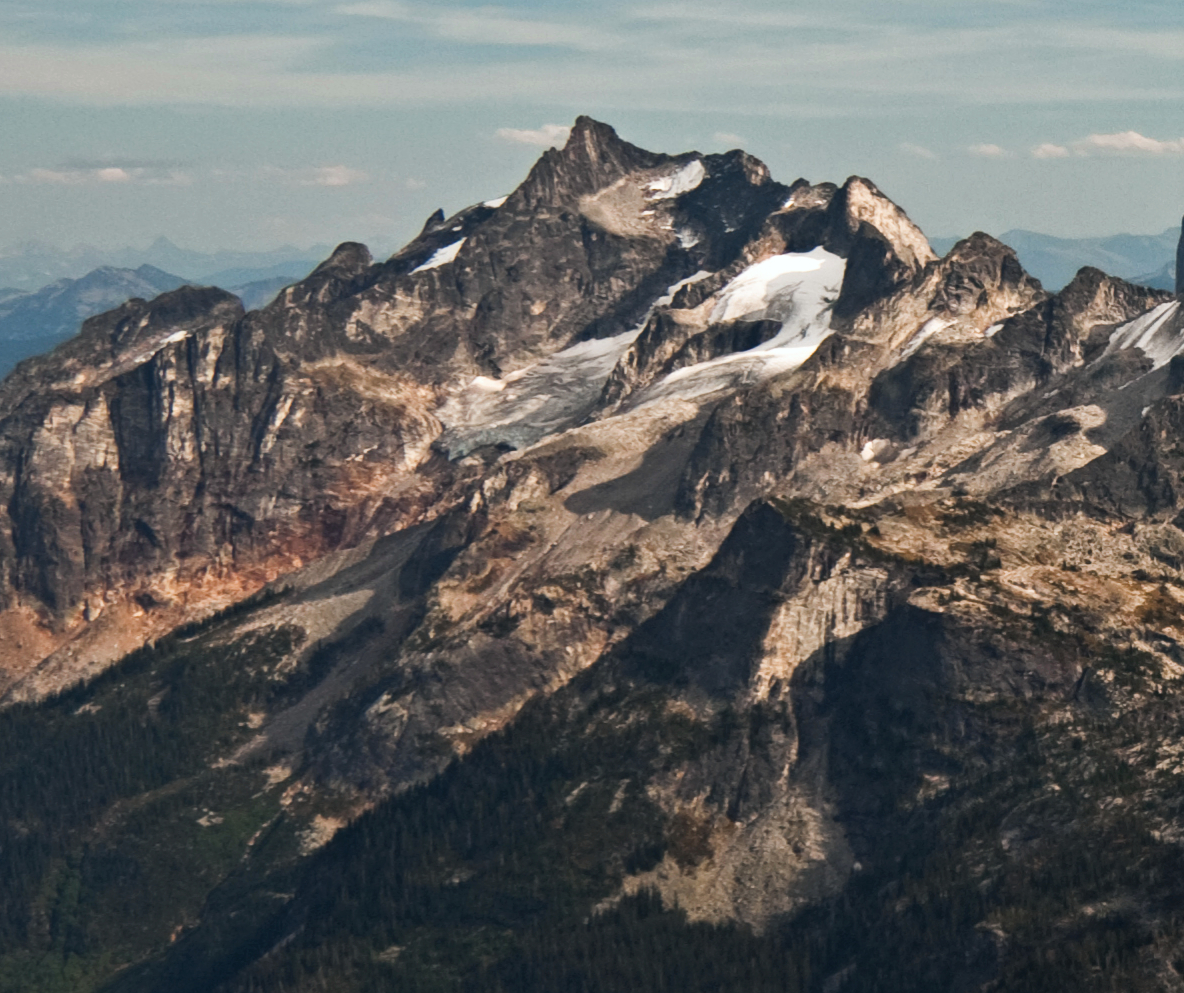
- Gladsheim Peak, north side with small glacier

Highest point
- Elevation: 2,830 m (9,280 ft)
- Prominence: 2,056 m (6,745 ft)
- Parent peak: Mount Cooper (3094 m)
- Listing: Mountains of British Columbia; Ultras of Canada 35th; Canada highest major peaks 85th; Ultras of North America
- Coordinates: 49°47′12″N 117°37′38″W

Geography
- Location within British Columbia Location within Canada
- Interactive map of Gladsheim Peak
- Location: Valhalla Provincial Park; British Columbia, Canada
- District: Kootenay Land District
- Parent range: Valhalla Ranges; Selkirk Mountains
- Topo map: NTS 82F13 Burton

Geology
- Rock type: Granitic

Climbing
- First ascent: 1963 by Kim Dean, Parker Williams, Bud Stoval, Jack Oswald, Mike Stewart
- Easiest route: West Ridge class 5.3

Gladsheim Peak is a prominent 2,830-metre (9,280-foot) mountain summit located in the Valhalla Ranges of the Selkirk Mountains in British Columbia, Canada. Gladsheim is the highest point in the Valhalla Ranges. It is situated in the southern part of Valhalla Provincial Park, 2.7 km (1.7 mi) northeast of Gimli Peak, and 12 km (7.5 mi) west of Slocan and Slocan Lake. The name "Valhalla Mountains" first appeared in George Mercer Dawson's Geological Survey of Canada map published in 1890. Dawson applied names derived from Scandinavian mythology to several of the mountain ranges and peaks in Southern Kootenay. Gladsheim is the magnificent meeting hall containing thirteen council seats where, according to Norse mythology, Odin presided over all the realms. In keeping with the Valhalla theme, this peak's name was submitted in 1900 by R. W. Brock to the Geological Survey of Canada for consideration, and it was officially adopted March 31, 1924, by the Geographical Names Board of Canada.

Based on the Köppen climate classification, Gladsheim Peak has a subarctic climate with cold, snowy winters, and mild summers. Temperatures can drop below −20 °C with wind chill factors below −30 °C. Precipitation runoff from the mountain drains into Gwillim Creek and Mulvey Creek, both tributaries of the Slocan River. Its nearest higher peak is Mount Cooper, 49.0 km (30.4 mi) to the northeast.

== Climbing Routes ==
Established climbing routes on Gladsheim Peak:

- West Ridge - class 5.3
- West Face - class 5.8
- South Face, The White Dihedral - class 5.10d
- Southwest Face - class 5.9
- North Ridge Bypass - class 5.10b
- Trireme Wall - class 5.6

== Gallery ==
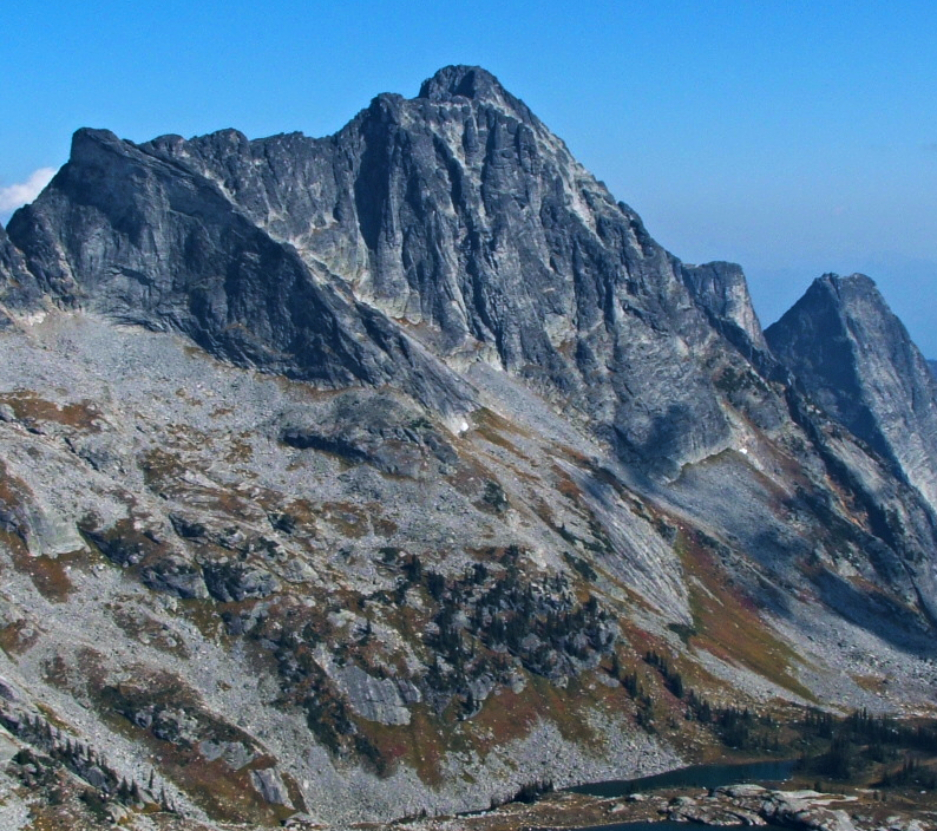
Gladsheim Peak, southwest aspect

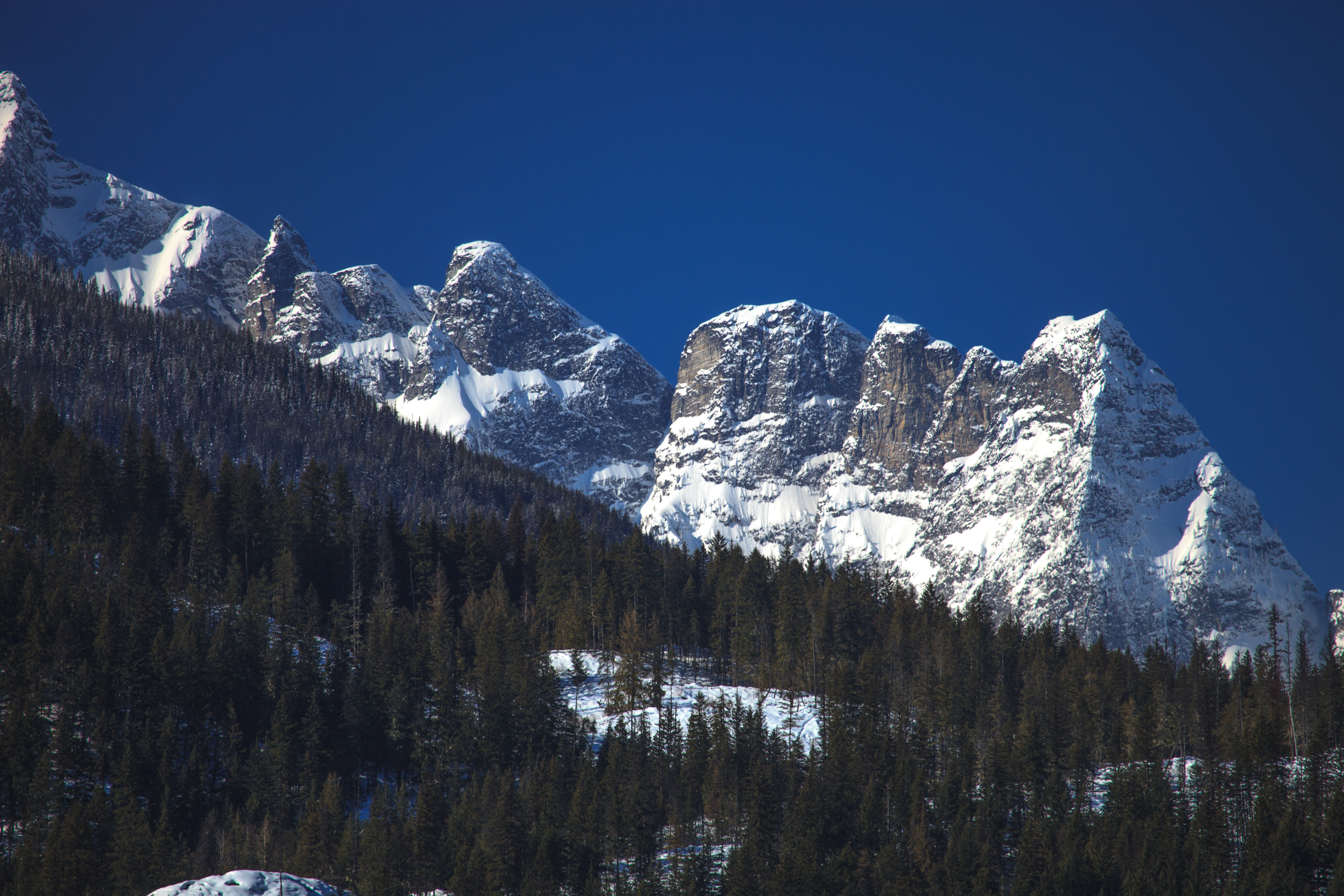
Gladsheim Peak in upper left edge. "Wedge" furthest to right. In between are the subsidiary peaks on Gladsheim's east ridge with unofficial names West Molar, East Molar, West Hump, and East Hump

== See also ==
- Geography of British Columbia
