= George Mercer Dawson =

Canadian geologist and surveyor (1849–1901)

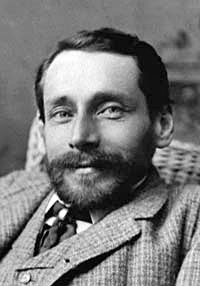
- Dawson in 1885
- Born: August 1, 1849; Pictou, Nova Scotia
- Died: March 2, 1901 (aged 51); Ottawa, Ontario, Canada
- Occupation(s): Geologist, surveyor

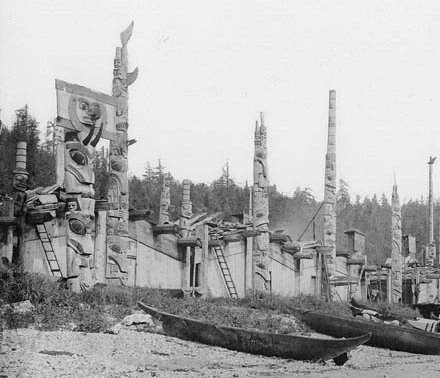
Haida Houses, taken by George M. Dawson

George Mercer Dawson CMG FRS FRSC (August 1, 1849 – March 2, 1901) was a Canadian geologist and surveyor. He performed many early explorations in western North America and compiled numerous records of the native peoples.

== Biography ==
He was born in Pictou, Nova Scotia, the eldest son of Sir John William Dawson, Principal of McGill University and a noted geologist, and his wife, Lady Margaret Dawson. By age 11, he was afflicted with tuberculosis of the spine (Pott's disease) that resulted in a deformed back and stunted growth. Physical limitations, however, did not deter Dawson from becoming one of Canada's greatest scientists.

Tutors and his father provided his education during his slow recovery from the illness. Dawson later attended the High School of Montreal and McGill University (part-time) before moving to London to study geology and paleontology at the Royal School of Mines (now part of Imperial College London) in 1869. Dawson graduated after three years with the highest marks in his class.

Dawson began his career in the 1870s as a professor of chemistry at Morrin College in Quebec City. From 1873 to 1875, he worked for the British North American Boundary Commission surveying the International Boundary. The result was the 387-page Report on the Geology and Resources of the Region in the Vicinity of the Forty-Ninth parallel from the Lake of the Woods to the Rocky Mountains, which established Dawson's reputation as a respected scientist.

Dawson joined the Geological Survey of Canada (GSC) in 1875 and led many field parties in Canada's north and west. His work is credited as having laid the foundations of much of our knowledge of the geology and natural history of those regions. For example, during 1883 and 1884, Dawson travelled through the Canadian Rockies, where he mapped out the major mountains, mountain passes, and rivers. Some of the many peaks he charted were Mount Assiniboine, 3,618 meters (11,870 ft), and Mount Temple, 3,543 meters (11,624 ft). As a result of his field research, a map of his work was published in 1886 covering the Canadian Rockies from the US border to the Red Deer River Valley and Kicking Horse Pass.

In addition to his geological work, Dawson was keenly interested in the languages and cultures of the First Nations peoples he met in his travels. While studying the coal deposits of the Queen Charlotte Islands (Haida Gwaii) in 1878, he prepared a comprehensive report on the Haida people, which included a vocabulary of their language. His photographs of Haida villages and totem poles remain a treasured and unique record. He also published papers about the Indigenous peoples of the Yukon and northern British Columbia, the Kwakiutl people of Vancouver Island and the Shuswap people of central British Columbia.

The field season of 1887 saw Dawson and his assistant R.G. McConnell exploring northern British Columbia and the headwaters of the Yukon River, during which they made an arduous circuit by separate routes, on foot and by boat, of an area of 63,200 square miles (164,000 km^{2}), which had been previously unknown except for First Nations accounts and those of a few prospectors. The results of the work included some of the first maps of the Yukon. His report was republished ten years later to satisfy interest in the region as a result of the Klondike Gold Rush. Dawson City, Yukon, was named in his honour, as was Dawson Creek, British Columbia.

In 1898, Dawson lead a field expedition with the intent of surveying resources, along with the famed anarchist, Peter Kropotkin, who was awed by the skill that he saw in Dawson and wrote that he knew "the Rocky Mountains and the coast ranges as his own garden."

Dawson became assistant director of the GSC in 1883 and was appointed its third director in 1895. Under his leadership, the GSC continued its far-flung expeditions to study all aspects of Canada's geology and natural history. Reflecting Dawson's interest in ethnology, the GSC's museum increased its indigenous collections, and these formed the basis of what is now the Canadian Museum of History. He also lobbied the government tirelessly to secure funding for a more suitable building to house the GSC's museum and scientific staff. This funding was granted just one month before his unexpected death in Ottawa on March 2, 1901, after a one-day bout with acute bronchitis. He was interred in the family plot in the Mount Royal Cemetery in Montreal. The building that resulted from his efforts was the Victoria Memorial Museum Building.

== Honours ==
Dawson received an LL.D. from Queen's University in 1890 and from McGill University in 1891. In 1891, Dawson was also named a fellow of the Royal Society of London. In 1892, he was made a Companion of the Order of St Michael and St George.

He was president of the Geological Society of America in 1900, just seven years after his father served in the same role.

== See also ==
- Boundary Commission Trail

Professional and academic associations
Preceded by John George Bourinot	President of the Royal Society of Canada; 1893–1894	Succeeded by James MacPherson Le Moine
