= Valhalla Ranges =

Mountain range in British Columbia, Canada

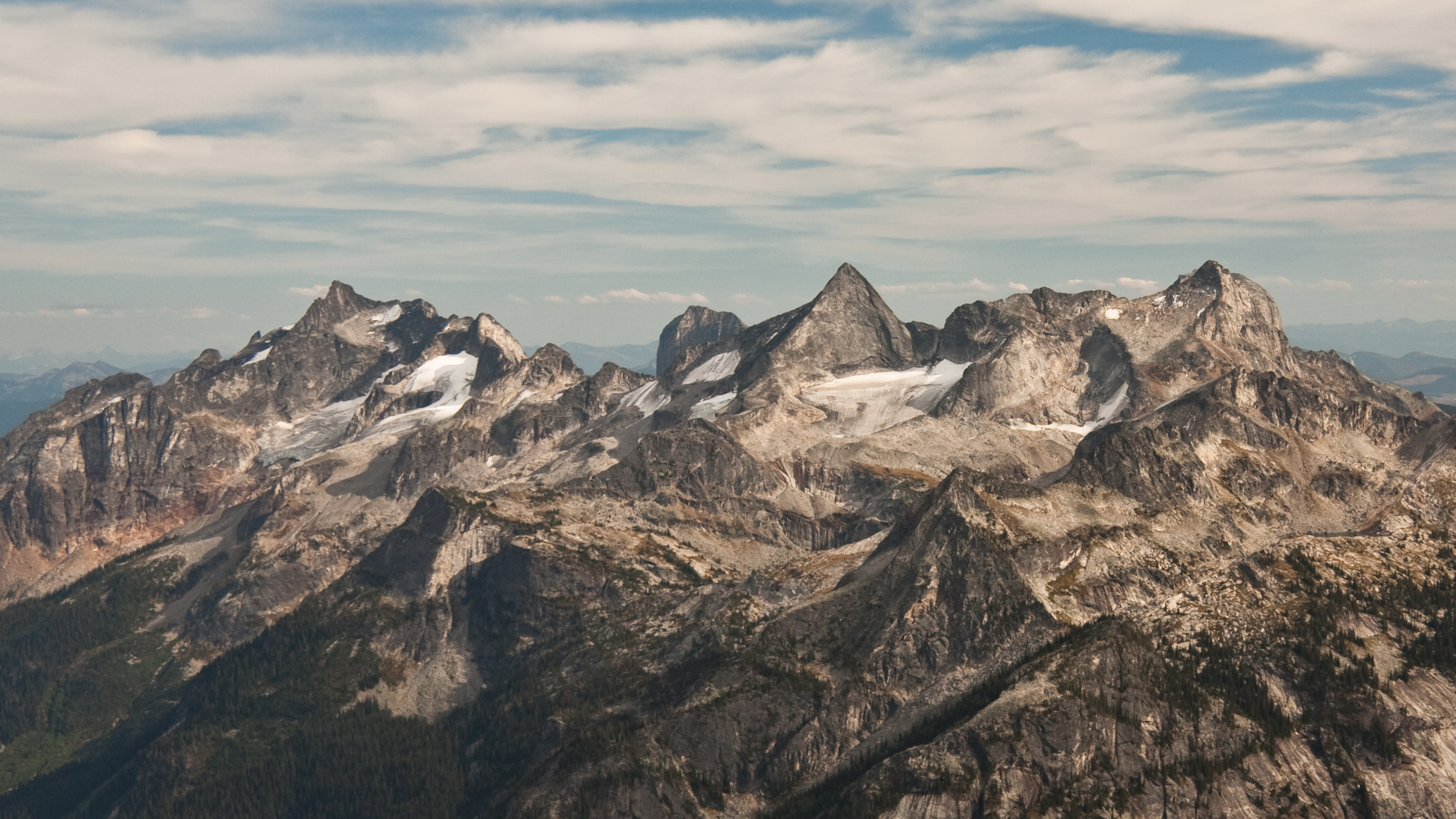
- Gladsheim, Asgard, and Midgard from the north

Highest point
- Peak: Gladsheim Peak
- Elevation: 2,830 m (9,280 ft)
- Coordinates: 49°47′N 117°43′W

Geography
- Location within British Columbia
- Country: Canada
- Province: British Columbia
- Parent range: Selkirk Mountains

The Valhalla Ranges are a subrange of the Selkirk Mountains of the Columbia Mountains in southeastern British Columbia, Canada, located between Lower Arrow Lake of the Arrow Lakes and Slocan River.

The ranges were named by G.M. Dawson for the hall of immortality where Norse heroes went after their death in battle.

== Sub-ranges ==
- Ruby Range
