= Valhalla Provincial Park =

Provincial park in British Columbia

- IUCN category Ib (wilderness area)
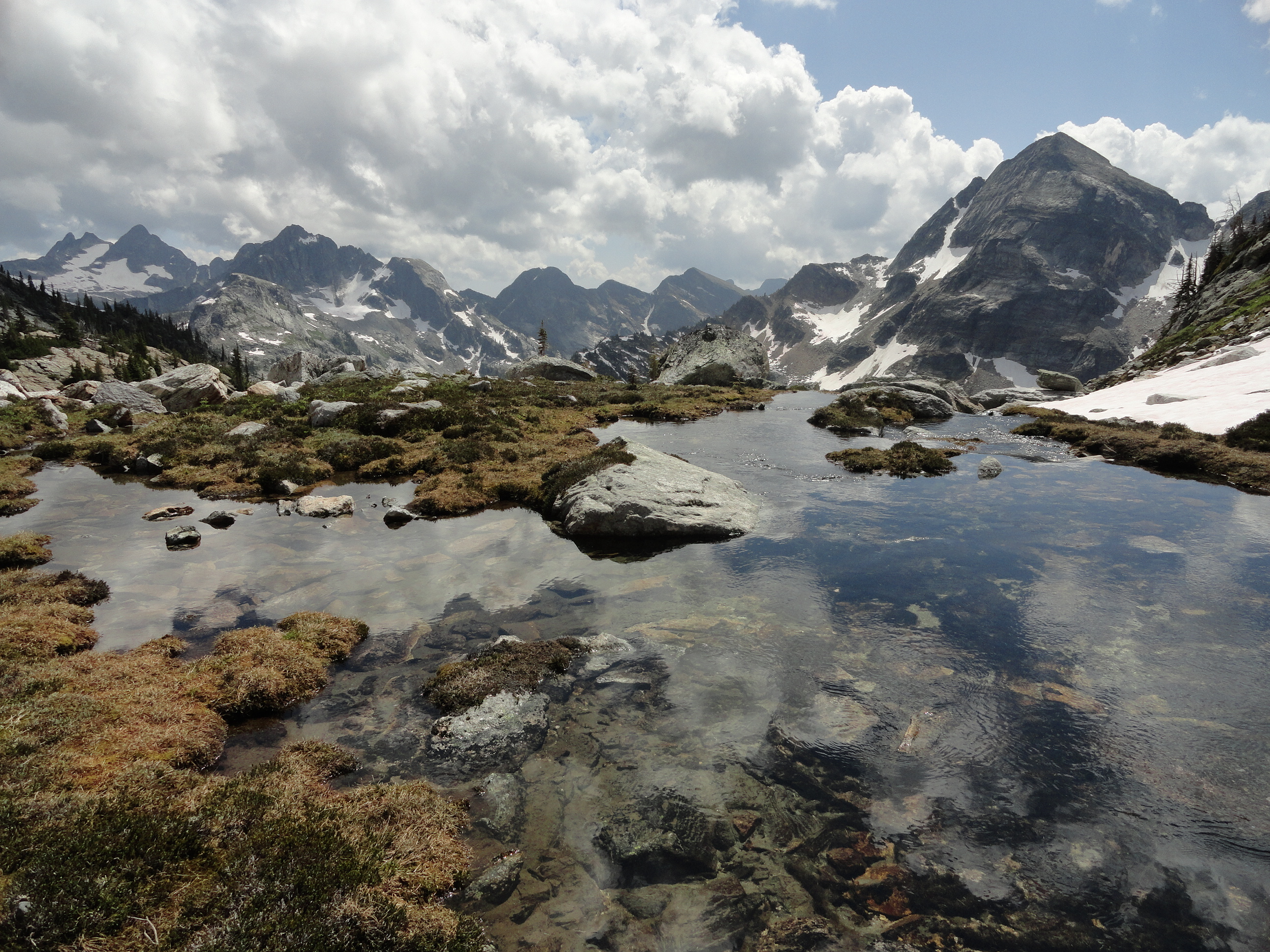
- Gregorio Peak from near Gwillim Lakes

- Location within British Columbia
- Interactive map of Valhalla Provincial Park
- Location: Central Kootenay, British Columbia, Canada
- Nearest town: Slocan
- Coordinates: 49°52′57″N 117°35′00″W
- Area: 50,060 ha (193.3 sq mi)
- Established: March 3, 1983
- Governing body: BC Parks

Valhalla Provincial Park is a provincial park in British Columbia, Canada. It was established on March 3, 1983, in the mountains above the Western shores of Slocan Lake, in the west Kootenays. The park consists of most of the Valhalla Ranges of the Selkirk Mountains.

== Geography ==
It is 49,893 hectares in size with 30 kilometres (19 mi) of shoreline along Slocan Lake. The park has limited methods of access, and is popular with climbers. Colleen McCrory's Valhalla Society advocated for the creation of the park.

== See also ==
- Kokanee Glacier Provincial Park
