= Burton, British Columbia =

Settlement in British Columbia, Canada

Coordinates: 49°59′00″N 117°53′00″W

Location of Burton in British Columbia

Burton is a settlement on the east shore of Lower Arrow Lake in the West Kootenay region of southeastern British Columbia.

Inadequate archeological evidence in the area exists to support several First Nations claims. Burton arose in the 1890s, then called Trout Creek, when gold was found at Caribou Creek, one of two creeks flowing out into Lower Arrow Lake at this location (the other is Burton Creek) and the name of a steamboat stop. The community was named for Arthur Burton who received his brother's pre-emption (Reuben & Byron Burton) when they left the area. Arriving miners and farmers spurred development. Served by CPR sternwheeler boats for many years until 1954, BC Highway 6 is now the main means of access. Tug boats still ply the lake towing log booms and barges.

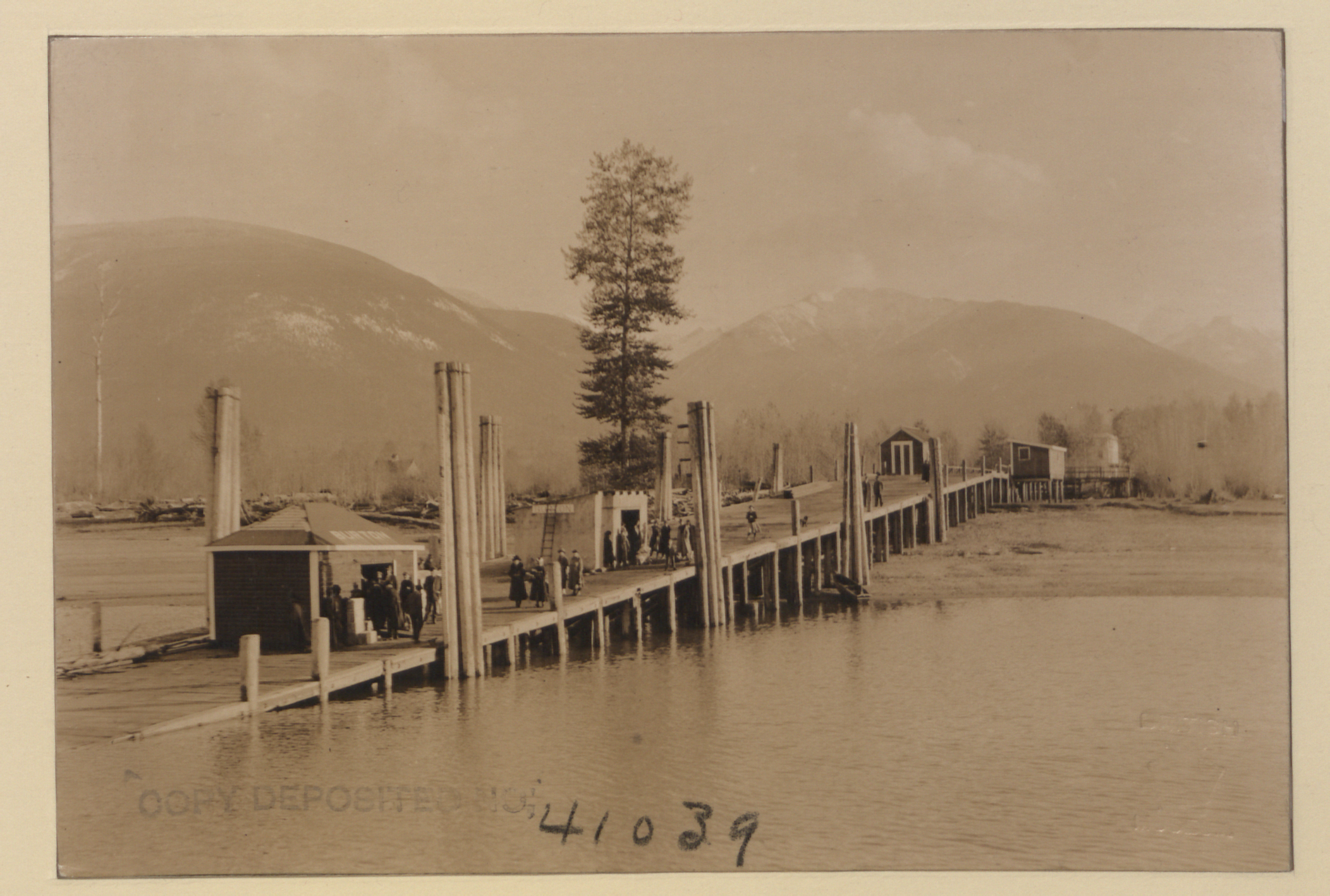
Wharf at Burton, 1923

The original townsite was submerged when the Keenleyside Dam flooded the area in 1968. A new town site was established on higher ground at that time. The old town site had four stores, gas stations, cafe, school, playing fields, a community hall, a large Federal government wharf, several hotels and three churches. The old townsite was north of the mouth of Caribou Creek with farms north, south and east of the townsite. A scenic location surrounded by mountains with lake, creeks and wildlife close at hand.

As of the census of 2021, Burton had 132 inhabitants. Services are limited to a Community Hall with fitness equipment and wi-fi access, a Hipcamp site by Caribou Creek, another camping ground situated close to the grounds of the now-flooded Burton Farm,, and an elementary school.

== See also ==
- Steamboats of the Arrow Lakes
- Burton Elementary School (Burton, British Columbia)
