= Slocan Lake =

Lake in British Columbia, Canada

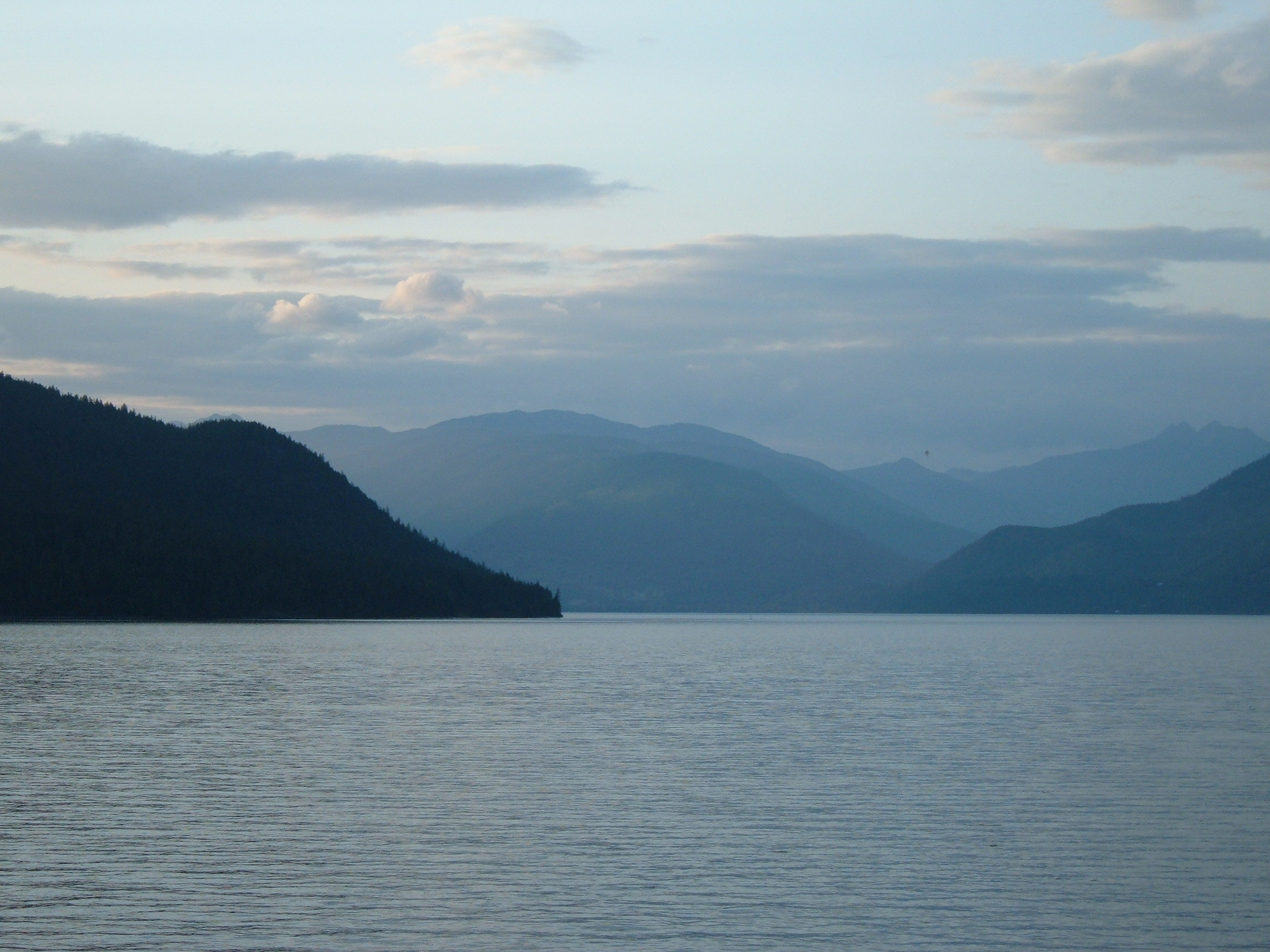
- as seen from Bannock Point

- Location within British Columbia
- Location: Slocan Country, West Kootenay, British Columbia
- Coordinates: 49°57′N 117°23′W
- Primary inflows: Bonanza Creek, Wilson Creek, Carpenter Creek, Seaton Creek
- Primary outflows: Slocan River
- Catchment area: Kootenay River
- Basin countries: Canada
- Max. length: 39 km (24 mi)
- Max. width: 2.7 km (1.7 mi)
- Surface area: 69.29 km^{2} (26.75 sq mi)
- Average depth: 171 m (561 ft)
- Max. depth: 298 m (978 ft)
- Water volume: 11.85 cubic kilometres (2.84 cu mi)
- Shore length^{1}: 84.1 kilometres (52.3 mi)
- Surface elevation: 542 m (1,778 ft)
- Settlements: Slocan City, New Denver, Silverton, Rosebery, Hills
- ^{1} Shore length is not a well-defined measure.

Slocan Lake is a lake in the Slocan Valley of the West Kootenay region of the Southeastern Interior of British Columbia, Canada. With an area of 69.29 km^{2} (26.75 sq mi) it has a maximum depth of 298 m (978 ft). It is fed by Bonanza Creek and drained by the Slocan River.

In 1947, a Canadian Pacific locomotive was lost in the lake when a barge on which it was being carried sank. The locomotive was located in 2020. The largest community on the lake is a village known as Slocan City.

== Description ==
The lake is drained by the Slocan River, which flows south from the lake's foot at Slocan City through the Slocan Valley to South Slocan, British Columbia, where that river meets the Kootenay River a few kilometres above its confluence with the Columbia. It is fed by Bonanza Creek, which comes down the pass from Summit Lake, beyond which is the town of Nakusp on Upper Arrow Lake.

In addition to Slocan City (officially now a "village", but usually referred to locally by its old name of Slocan City to distinguish it from Slocan Park and South Slocan), other towns and communities on the lake include the twin communities of New Denver and Silverton, midway up the lake's eastern shore, Rosebery slightly north of them at the mouth of Wilson Creek, and Hills at the lake's north end. To the west of the lake is the Valhalla Range (or "the Valhallas"), most of which is enshrined in Valhalla Provincial Park.

The mountains to the east of Slocan Lake were the focus of the silver rush known as "the Silvery Slocan", during which steamboats and railways penetrated the Kootenay Range east of the lake to Sandon, the "capital" of the rush and the destination of three railways, two from the direction of Slocan Lake via Carpenter Creek, the other via Retallack Pass from Kaslo on Kootenay Lake. The 1902 discovery of zinc in the area also aroused interest and excitement.

BC Highway 6 follows the eastern shore of Slocan lake from Hills to Slocan City and down the Slocan River from there. The Canadian Pacific rail line from Nakusp via Bonanza Pass now dead-ends at Rosebery Slip, on Slocan Lake, but originally ran into Sandon.

== Canadian Pacific No. 3512 ==
On January 1, 1947 the Canadian Pacific No. 3512 Locomotive sank in the lake after the rail barge it was on sank after taking on water. Together with some caboose and a Rotary Snowplow it sank to the bottom of the lake. The locomotive was located in 2020.

== Gallery ==
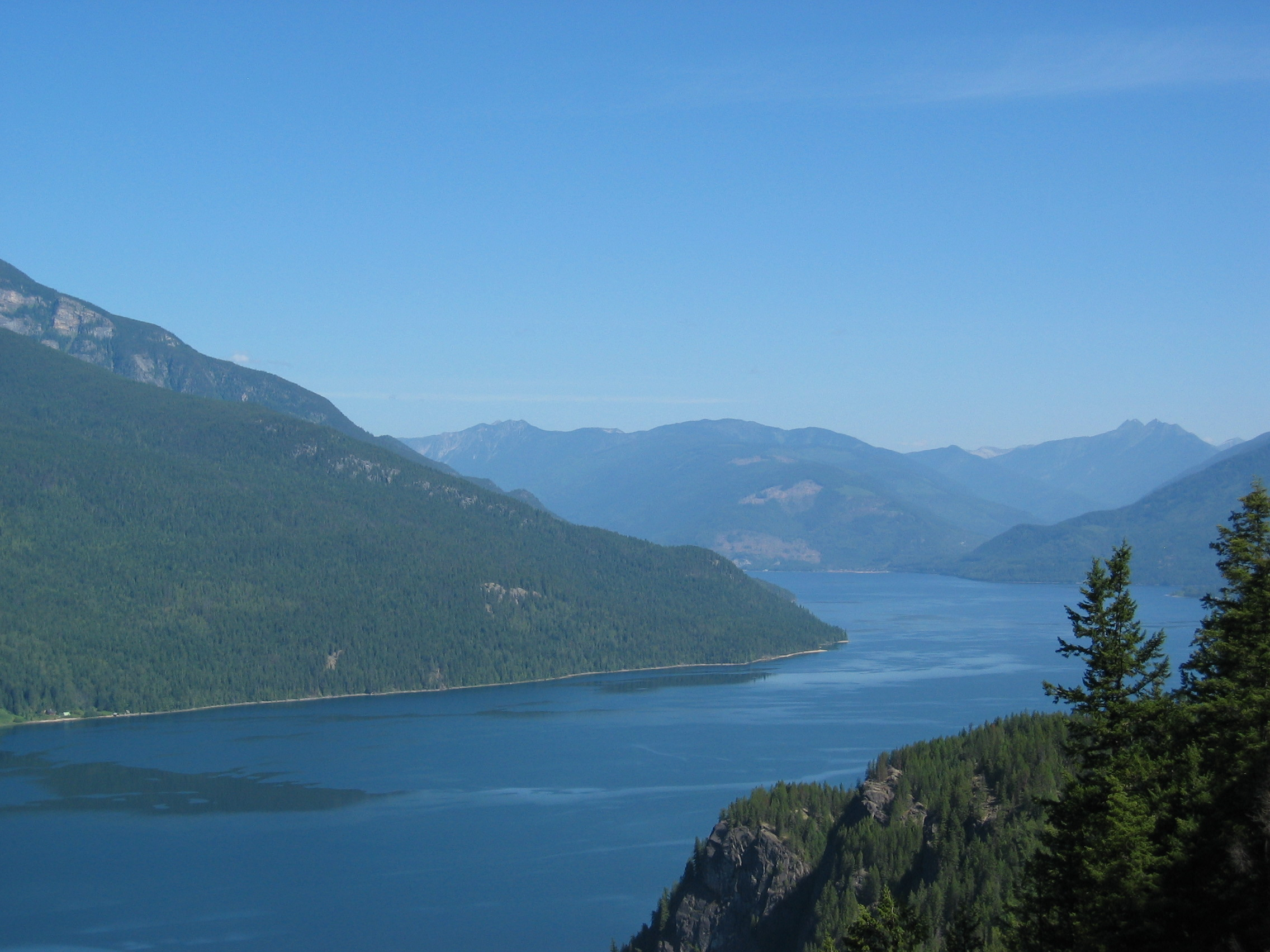

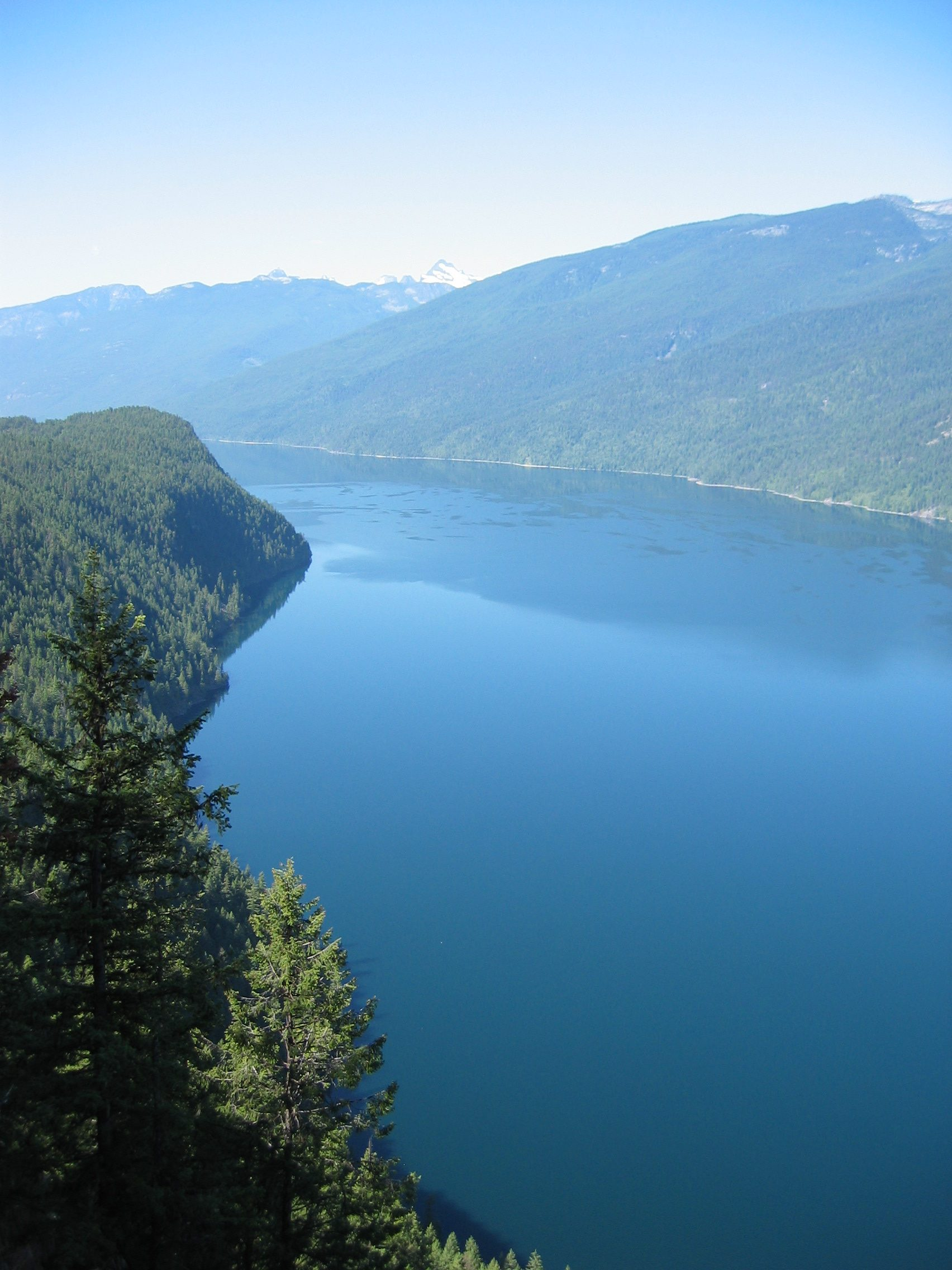

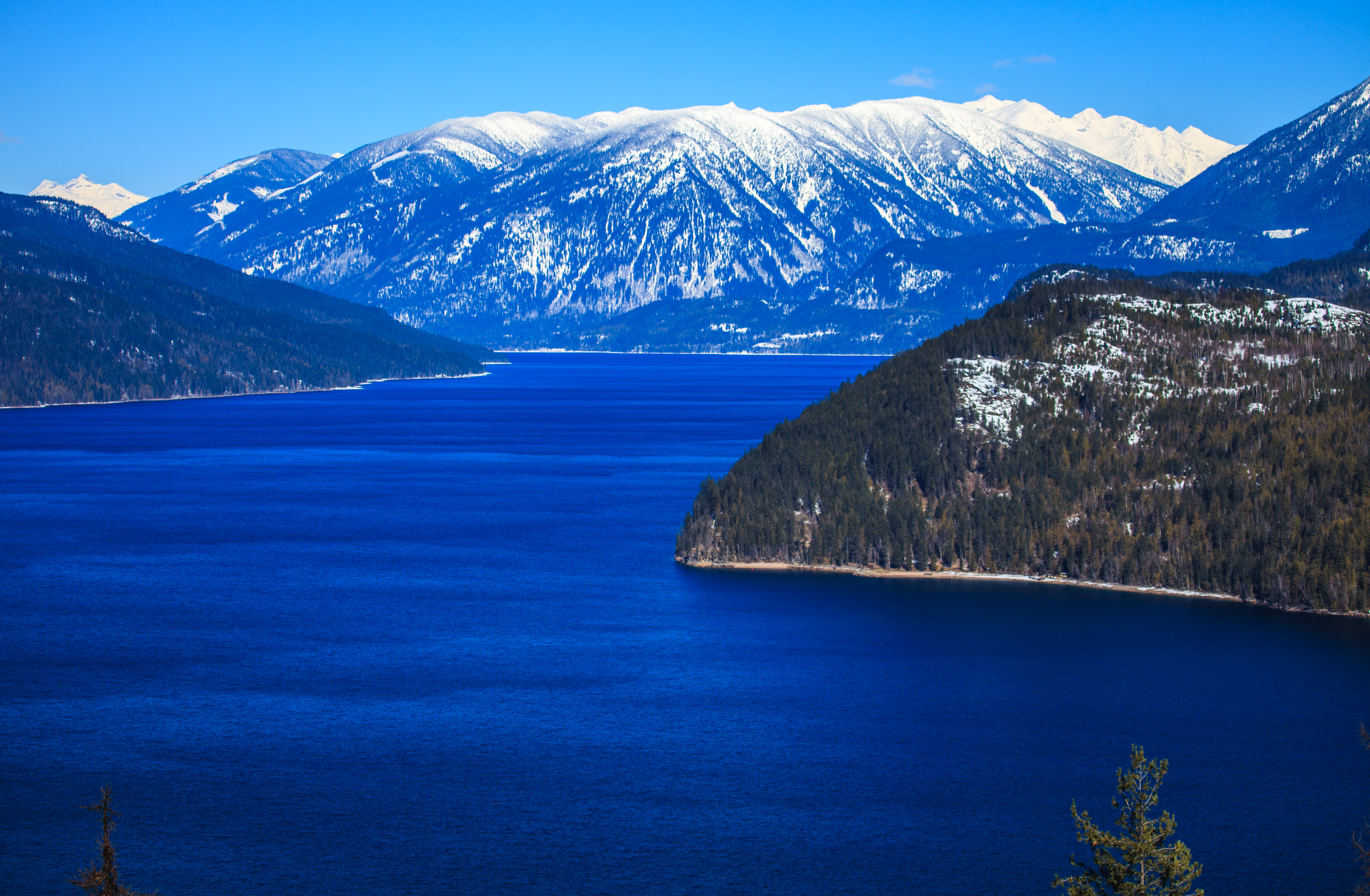

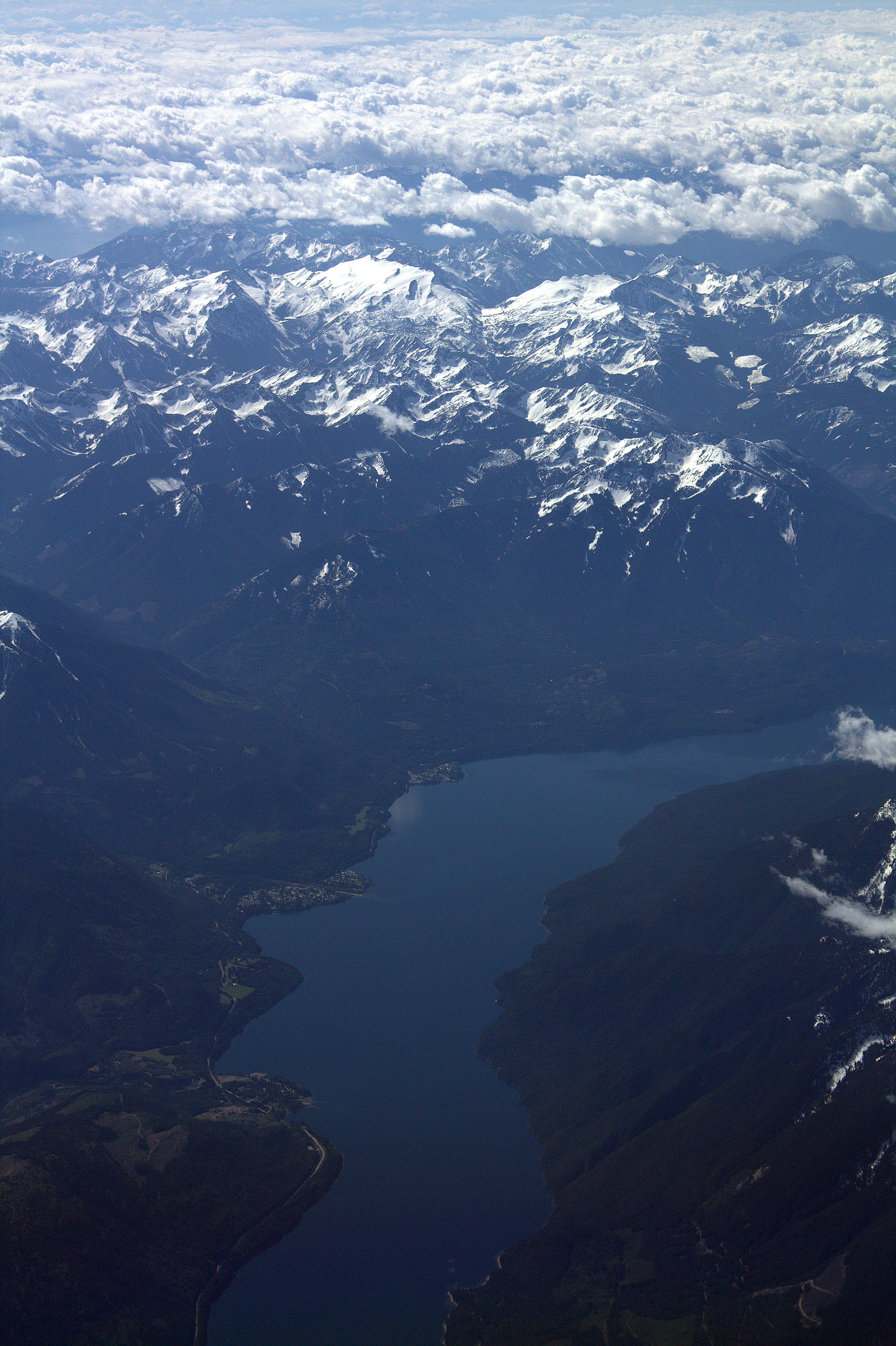

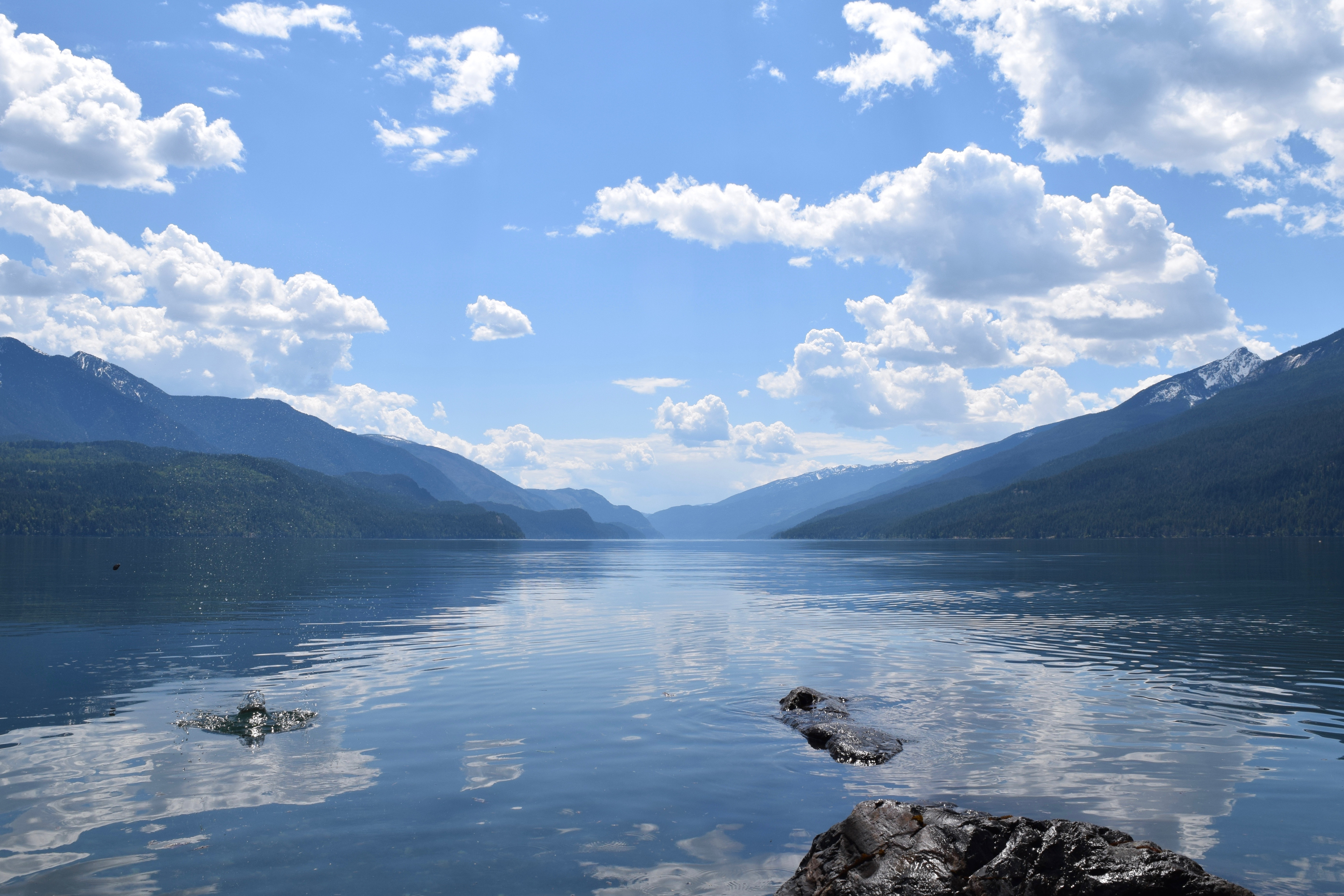

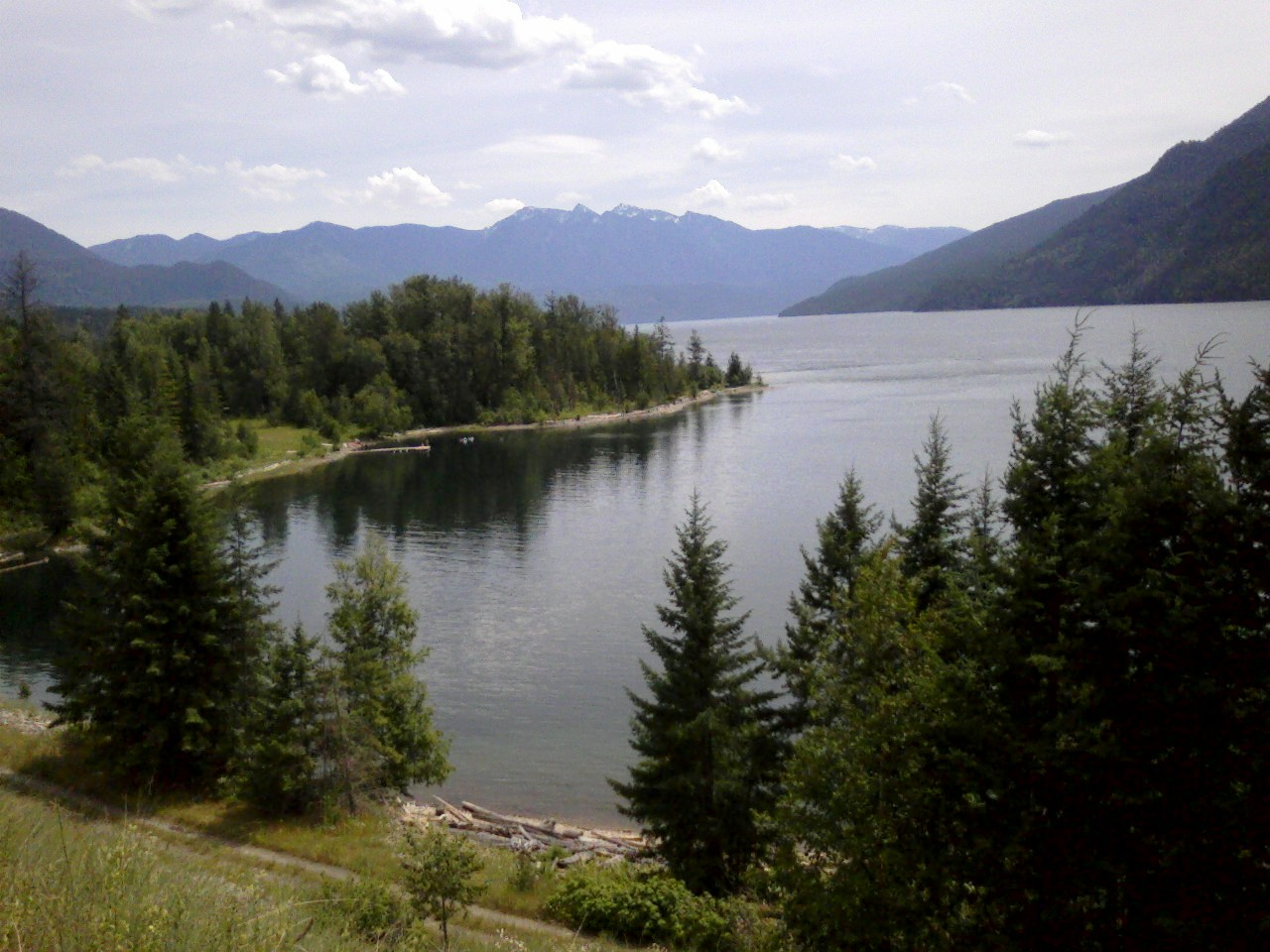

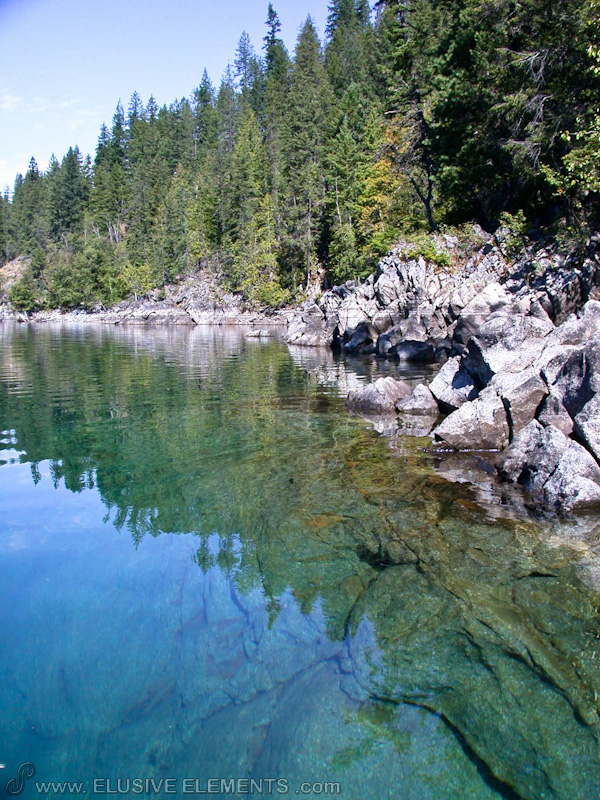

== See also ==
- List of lakes of British Columbia
