= Slocan River =

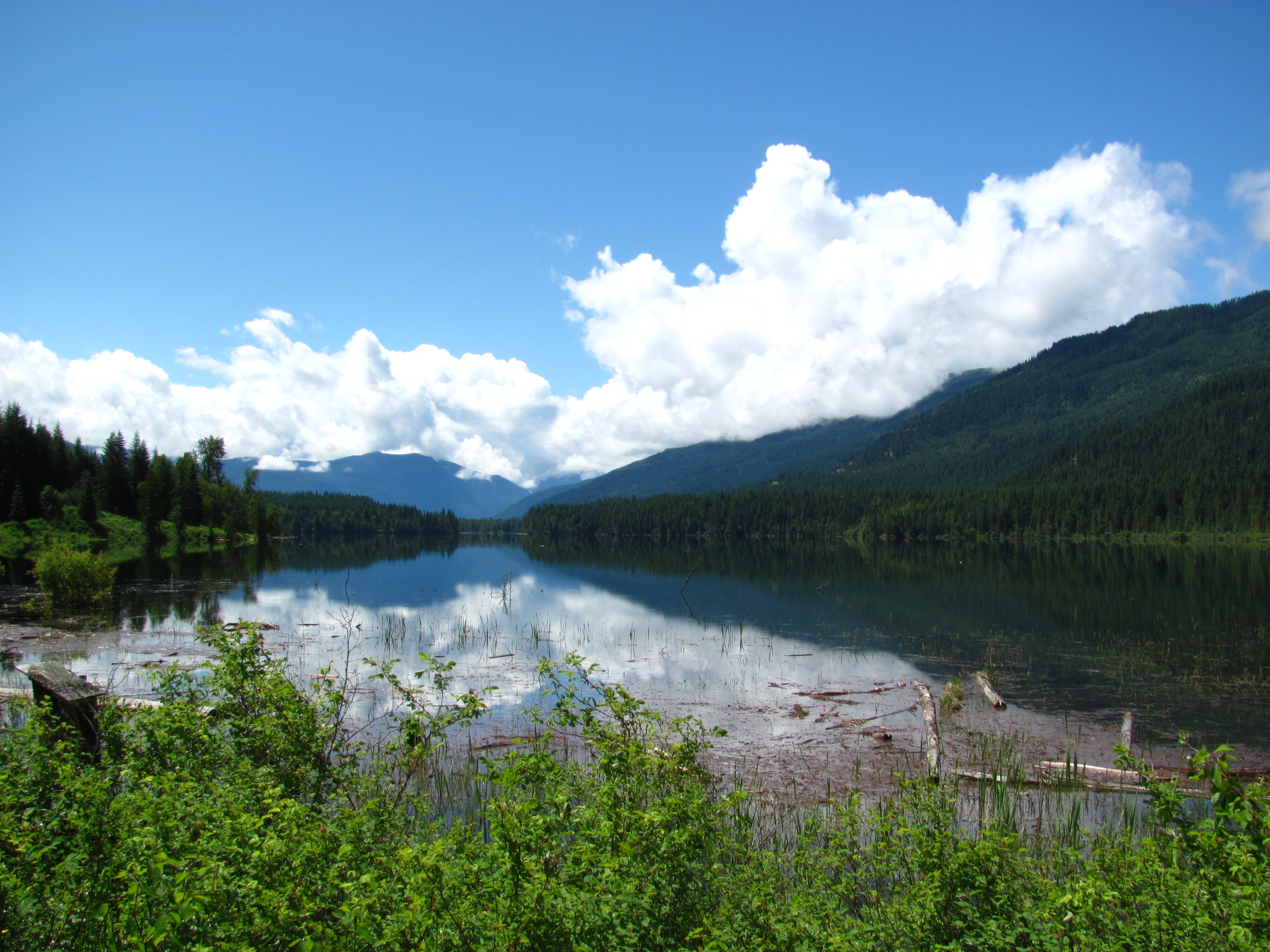

Location
- Country: Canada
- Province: British Columbia
- District: Kootenay Land District

Physical characteristics
- Source: Slocan Lake
- Mouth: Kootenay River
  - coordinates: 49°25′N 117°31′W
- Length: 60 km (37 mi)
- Basin size: 3,290 km^{2} (1,270 sq mi)
- Discharge
  - location: Near Crescent Valley
  - average: 89.1 m^{3}/s (3,150 cu ft/s)
  - minimum: 8.5 m^{3}/s (300 cu ft/s)
  - maximum: 694 m^{3}/s (24,500 cu ft/s)

The Slocan River is a 60-kilometre (37 mi) long tributary of the Kootenay River in the Canadian province of British Columbia. It is part of the Columbia River basin, as the Kootenay River is a tributary of the Columbia River. Its drainage basin is 3,290 square kilometres (1,270 sq mi) in area.

== Course ==
The Slocan River originates at the south end of Slocan Lake and flows south past Slocan and Winlaw to join the Kootenay River near Shoreacres, about halfway between Castlegar and Nelson. The route includes a mixture of broad flatwater, lazy meanders, gentle flows and, on the lowest section, a few rapids.

== See also ==
- List of rivers of British Columbia
- Tributaries of the Columbia River
- Media related to Slocan River at Wikimedia Commons
