= Slocan =

Slocan may refer to:

== Communities ==
- Slocan, British Columbia or Slocan City, a village in the Slocan Valley, British Columbia, Canada
- Slocan Valley or Slocan Country or Silvery Slocan, a valley in British Columbia, Canada
- Slocan Park, British Columbia, an unincorporated settlement in the Slocan Valley, British Columbia, Canada
- South Slocan, British Columbia, an unincorporated community on the Kootenay River, British Columbia, Canada
- Slocan (electoral district), a provincial electoral district in the Canadian province of British Columbia from 1903 to 1920

== Rivers and lakes ==
- Slocan River, tributary of the Kootenay River in British Columbia, Canada
  - Little Slocan River, a tributary of the Slocan River in British Columbia, Canada
- Slocan Lake, a lake in the Slocan Valley, British Columbia, Canada

== See also ==
- Kaslo-Slocan, a provincial electoral district in the Canadian province of British Columbia from 1924 to 1963
- Kaslo and Slocan Railway, a narrow gauge railway in the West Kootenay, British Columbia, Canada
- Nakusp and Slocan Railway, a historic Canadian railway that operated in southeastern British Columbia, Canada
