= Zincton, British Columbia =

Zincton
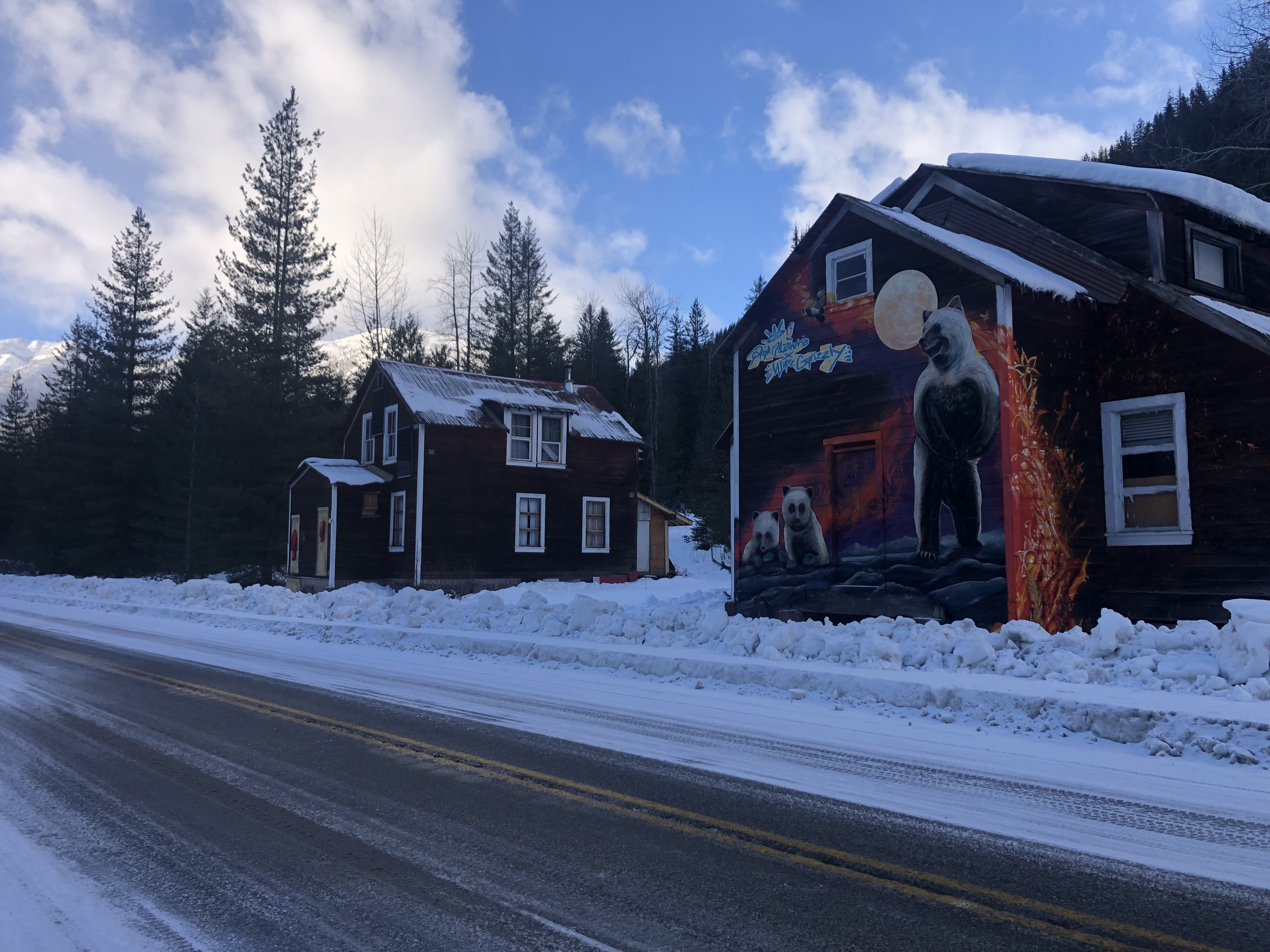

- Location of Zincton in British Columbia
- Coordinates: 50°01′59″N 117°12′04″W
- Country: Canada
- Province: British Columbia
- Region: West Kootenay
- Regional district: Central Kootenay
- Area codes: 250, 778, 236, & 672
- Highways: Highway 31A

Zincton is a ghost town in the West Kootenay region of southeastern British Columbia. This former mining community, on BC Highway 31A, is by road about 15 kilometres (9 mi) northeast of New Denver and 31 kilometres (19 mi) northwest of Kaslo.

== Name origin and railways ==
In 1892, cabin accommodation and a blacksmith shop were built. The location was originally known as Lucky Jim, because the only inhabitants were mine employees. Opening in 1895, the Kaslo and Slocan Railway (K&S), controlled by the Great Northern Railway (GN), passed adjacent to the mine. The cabin was a 30-minute walk from the K&S Lucky Jim siding, which existed by 1897. The official flag stop, established by 1908, was 2.7 kilometres (1.7 mi) northeast of McGuigan and 1.8 kilometres (1.1 mi) southwest of Bear Lake. In July 1910, a forest fire destroyed this section of track, and the K&S rail service permanently ceased.

In 1911, spur construction by the Nakusp and Slocan Railway (N&S), a Canadian Pacific Railway (CP) subsidiary, is the earliest mention of the rename to Zincton. This spur from Three Forks opened in September 1912. Zincton was about 0.3 kilometres (0.2 mi) northeast of the Lucky Jim, which was accessed by a siding that doubled back. At the switch, Zincton was 3.4 kilometres (2.1 mi) northeast of Rambler and 1.4 kilometres (0.9 mi) southwest of Giegerich.

At nearby Giegerich (formerly called Bear Lake), Gilbert Malcolm Sproat laid out a townsite at the east–west summit divide in 1892. The modest hotel was destroyed by fire, rebuilt, and taken over by Robert (Scottie) Mitchell, who opened a store in 1911. Mitchell was the only postmaster 1915–1932, the post office being named Zincton, a descriptive applied to the general area. A rare example of a postal cancellation has sold for $675.

== Mining ==
In 1892, James Shields, Charles Druin, and Robert Williams discovered the Lucky Jim claim, which they soon sold to Dr. E.C. Kilbourne. In 1897, 6,000 tons of ore was shipped to the short-lived Pilot Bay smelter, which was unable to successfully separate the zinc from the lead concentrates. By 1893, the Lucky Jim group (Lucky Jim, St. George, and Roadley claims) was owned by Dr. E.C. Kilbourne, a half, Robert Williams, a third, and Thomas J. Roadley, a sixth. By 1895, C.L. Arnold also held a minority interest, and Arnold and Williams operated the property. By 1897, the Braden Bros (related to the Mathews' family) were principals. A 1,219-metre (4,000 ft) three-rail gravity and a 366-metre (1,200 ft) aerial tramway to the K&S were installed.

After a long period of inactivity, in 1899, Arthur R. Browne bought and developed the property and sent 1,800 tons of ore to a smelter near Manchester. Following the untimely death of promoter Browne the next year, the enterprise floundered and the mine shut down. In 1903, a slide took out 18 metres (60 ft) of a branch tramway, which connected with the terminal of the main tramway. Displaying a low silver but high zinc content, the zinc ore only became marketable about this time because of advances in refining technology. On purchasing in 1904, G.W. Hughes held an 87.5 per cent interest in the mine and John Wolverton the balance. Production ceased in 1906, because of US import duties. However, shipping the stockpile resumed in 1907, continuing into 1908.

In 1909, G. Weaver Loper of Hemenway & Loper acquired the lease. Idle for three or four years because of Hughes' ill health, mine production resumed. On extensive expansion, the mine sought a daily, not three-times weekly, K&S service. The 1910 forest fire destroyed mainly defunct mine infrastructure and suffocated five men who retreated to a mine tunnel. To reach the N&S, work soon began on rebuilding the wagon road to Three Forks. New construction included a superintendent's house, two-storey bunkhouse, boarding house, compressor house, and office/store. In 1912, the N&S Three Forks spur was completed and a new 183-metre (600 ft) aerial tramway from no. 5 tunnel installed. In 1913, production fell, shipments temporarily ceased awaiting improved prices and the new US tariff implementation, borrowing increased, and the first mortgagor threatened foreclosure. The chain of problems and the shutdown in 1914 created doubts over the management skills of G. Weaver Loper.

In 1915, Andrew G. Larson was appointed receiver-manager for the mine, which used the Rosebery concentrator for periods. During his engagement, Larson restored the mine to a sound financial footing. Loper initially refused to hand over the company records, probably to hide his fraudulent issue of stock for personal gain. On discovery of the fraud, the company was legally obliged to increase the capital stock to cover the overissue. On pleading guilty in 1918, Loper was sentenced one to 10 years. Despite a 1921 reorganization of the company, a sale of the mine was ordered in 1923 to settle judgements. A.G. Larson and associates, operating as Pohlman Investment Co, bought the property. After active development uncovering largely lead deposits, the mine shipped its first carload of ore the next year. In 1925, processing restarted at the Rosebery mill. In 1927, the Victoria Syndicate, the mine operators, acquired claims in the area and rebuilt the town. The next year, the syndicate built a new mill at Zincton.

The mine closed in 1959. Zincton was the largest producer of zinc in the Slocan area. In the 1980s, fire destroyed the derelict buildings. Nowadays, concrete ruins occupy the overgrown site.

== Zincton all-seasons resort proposal ==
The resort proponents worked closely with David Harley, a long-time New Denver resident to plan a lift-serviced zone and five backcountry zones north of the highway along London and Whitewater ridges, stretching from Three Forks to Retallack. Hiking, sightseeing, and mountain biking in summer would complement lift-serviced and backcountry skiing in winter. At the western end, Zincton Mountain Village, located on adjacent private land, would provide a base area for ski lifts, community services, and amenities. The project is at the formal proposal stage, the second of three stages.

== See also ==
- "1927 Silvery Slocan map". www.library.ubc.ca. p. 63 (39).
