= Cody, British Columbia =

Ghost town in British Columbia, Canada

Coordinates: 49.975126°N 117.196865°W

Cody is at the confluence of Cody Creek into Carpenter Creek in the West Kootenay region of southeastern British Columbia. The ghost town, about one kilometre east of Sandon, lies off BC Highway 31A. By road, the former mining community is about 15 kilometres (9 mi) east of New Denver and 44 kilometres (27 mi) west of Kaslo.

== Name origin ==
Cody Creek was named after prospector Henry Cody, the discoverer. The earliest newspaper mention of the creek was June 1892 and the townsite (initially called Cody Creek) was February 1895. However, the latter was not surveyed until June 1896. Apart from the creek and townsite, Henry is honoured in the naming of Mount Cody, Cody Caves, and Cody Caves Provincial Park.

== Mining ==
During the 1892/93 winter, ore travelled over the Cody Creek–Kaslo sleigh road. In late 1892, the contractor building a wagon road along this route abandoned the half-completed project. A new crew continued the work the next year. Remaining unfinished by yearend, the imminent arrival of the railway appears to have negated completion. During the 1894/95 winter, ore moved via the Cody Creek–Three Forks sleigh road to connect with the new Nakusp and Slocan Railway (N&S).

The Noble Five and Last Chance mines, the two most significant properties, operated aerial tramways. To the northeast, the Noble Five comprised eight claims holding solid galena and carbonate deposits. The 1,859-metre (6,100 ft) tramway provided a 20 tons per hour capacity. At the base, the concentrator had a 120-ton daily capacity. To the northwest, the Last Chance comprised seven claims on a property the Hennessey brothers located in 1891. The 853-metre (2,800 ft) tramway could handle 75 tons daily. At the base, the ore was loaded into sacks for transportation. The respective railway spur lengths were 251 metres (825 ft) for the Noble Five and 71 metres (232 ft) for the Last Chance.

By World War I, only the Noble Five mill complex remained at Cody. Erected in 1918, the larger replacement mill burned down in 1944. The third mill, built in 1952, operated only six months before closing permanently.

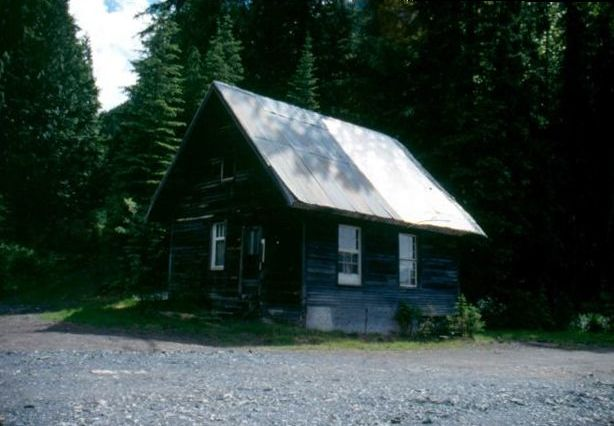
Former K&S station, Cody, 1993

== Railway ==
The Cody Creek mouth was the proposed terminal for the Kaslo and Slocan Railway (K&S), with a spur to Sandon, but on construction, the two were reversed. The rail head reached Cody in January 1896.

The planned turntable may never have been installed, but a wye was laid in summer 1904 for turning the rotary snowplow.

By 1897, the Sandon–Cody passenger run was daily. The service became twice weekly in November 1901 but ceased in 1905. All rail service ended in 1908.

== Early community ==
Cody was expected to rival if not surpass Sandon. At its peak, the two-storey Cody Creek Hotel, a livery, three laundries, and other businesses flourished. A.B. Docksteader was the inaugural and only postmaster 1897–1901.

Permanent residents peaked at about 150. The final listing for the barber, blacksmith, dry goods store, and the Alberta, Central and Winter's hotels was 1897, and the Pacific and Noble Five hotels was the next year. By 1899, the population had fallen to around 100.

The general store closed around 1901 and final laundry around 1902. Beyond mining, a hotel was the only business remaining by 1903. Gone by 1910, Cody was deserted.

== Present site ==
Surviving remnants comprise the K&S station, the Noble Five concentrator, a few shacks, and parts of the aerial tramway. The precise location of the cemetery, which contained at least six graves, is unknown.
