= Silverton, British Columbia =

Silverton
- Village
- The Corporation of the Village of Silverton
- Location of Silverton in British Columbia
- Coordinates: 49°57′3″N 117°21′29″W
- Country: Canada
- Province: British Columbia
- Region: Slocan Valley, West Kootenay
- Regional district: Central Kootenay
- Incorporated: 1930

Government
  - Mayor: Tanya Gordon

Area
  - Total: 0.35 km^{2} (0.14 sq mi)
- Elevation: 550 m (1,800 ft)

Population (2016)
  - Total: 195
  - Density: 550.5/km^{2} (1,426/sq mi)
- Time zone: UTC−07:00 (PT)
- Area codes: 250, 778, 236, & 672
- Highways: Highway 6 Highway 31A
- Waterways: Slocan Lake
- Website: Official website

Silverton is a village about 5 kilometres (3 mi) south of New Denver in the West Kootenay region of southeastern British Columbia. The former steamboat landing is at the mouth of Silverton Creek on the eastern shore of Slocan Lake. The locality, on BC Highway 6 at the junction of BC Highway 31A, is about 95 kilometres (59 mi) by road north of Castlegar and 155 kilometres (96 mi) by road and ferry south of Revelstoke.

== Name origin ==
Four Mile or Four Mile City, the former name, came from Four Mile Creek flowing through the town. In 1892, William Hunter and J. Fred Hume bought 160 acres of Crown land, upon which they founded the townsite the same year. By 1893, the creek was sometimes called Silverton Creek. The four miles likely measured the distance by trail from New Denver. That year, the new townsite was promoted as Silverton, probably after Silverton, Colorado. Over time, Silverton also became the predominant, then official, name for the creek. It May also be named after Silverton, NSW in Australia, as the Broken Hill mining corp, based near Silverton in the town of Broken Hill, set up shop and mining operations based out of Neslon, BC, at the turn of the century.

== Early community ==
The Slocan Trading and Navigation Co. (ST&N) steamboat Wm. Hunter, launched at New Denver in November 1892, would have served the location on its regular trips from New Denver to the head and foot of the lake. In 1894, the townsite was surveyed.

The ST&N, which had primarily served New Denver to Silverton, and Bonanza City, substituted Rosebery/Wilson Creek for the latter from the beginning of 1895. Rosebery connected north with the Nakusp & Slocan Railway to Nakusp on the Upper Arrow Lake, and south with the Slocan Lake ferry to Slocan.

By the late 1890s, six hotels, three general stores, a newspaper, and school existed. Silverton was incorporated as a village in 1930. By this time, the population had fallen to about 500. It was 270 in 1934, 234 in 1939, and 219 in 1943.

== Mining ==
During the Silvery Slocan rush of 1892, miners inundated the area. That year, three key mineral claims, the Standard, Echo, and Alpha, were registered. Silverton catered to miners working the south face of Idaho Mountain. The decline in mining from 1900 culminated in most mining ceasing during the Great Depression.

The underground Willa Mine, 7.5 kilometres (4.7 mi) south, which has been touted as a profitable investment by a series of different owners over the past 35 years, was abandoned in 2016 by present owners, MX Gold Corporation. Since the early 1890s, no significant ore has been processed from the site.

== Present community ==
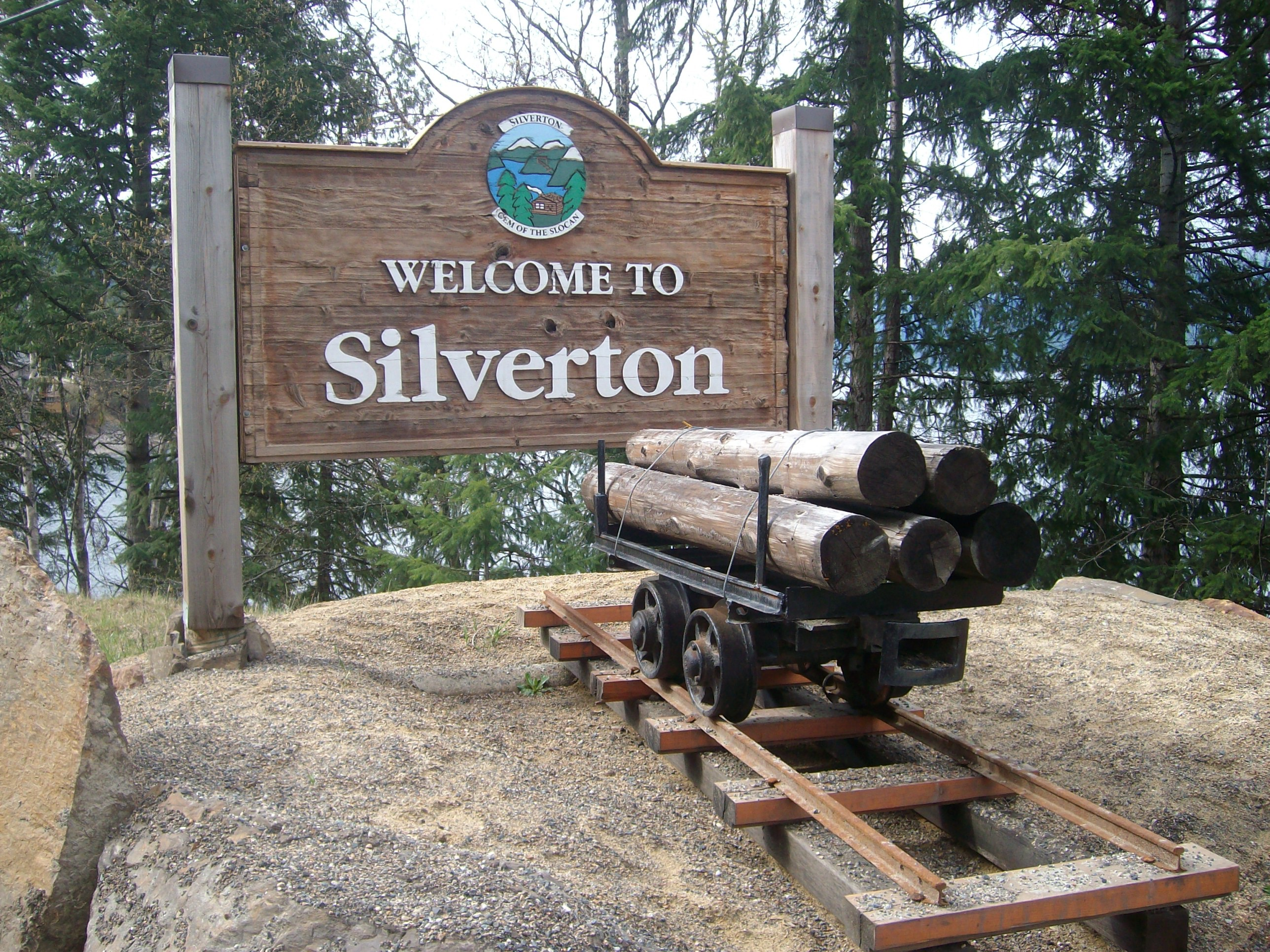
Silverton's welcome sign

At 0.35 square kilometres (0.14 sq mi), Silverton is the smallest municipality in BC by area, and was the smallest by population 2002–2011. Zeballos has since held the latter title. When Silverton mayor Jason Clarke was asked to comment on the fact that the census population of 185 at 2016 was the same as 2011, he joked that no one is allowed to leave unless they find a replacement.

The Silverton Gallery (1919) once housed the second school, but is today used for exhibits by local artists, music and dance classes, concerts and social events. Within the grounds is the Interpretive Centre displaying historical photographs and a collection of artifacts salvaged from surrounding mines, with larger items in the Outdoor Mining Museum by the road. Opposite, two streets back, the Fingland Cabin is restored as a blacksmith shop.

The Silverton Lakeshore Inn was the Selkirk Hotel (1897) prior to refurbishing. The lakeshore campground has 20 sites, and along Silverton Creek are 20 further sites.

== Demographics ==
In the 2021 Census of Population conducted by Statistics Canada, Silverton had a population of 149 living in 78 of its 128 total private dwellings, a change of −23.6% from its 2016 population of 195. With a land area of 0.35 km^{2} (0.14 sq mi), it had a population density of 425.7/km^{2} (1,102.6/sq mi) in 2021.

== Notable people ==
- Randolph Harding, politician
