= Slocan Valley =

Valley in British Columbia, Canada

- Valley
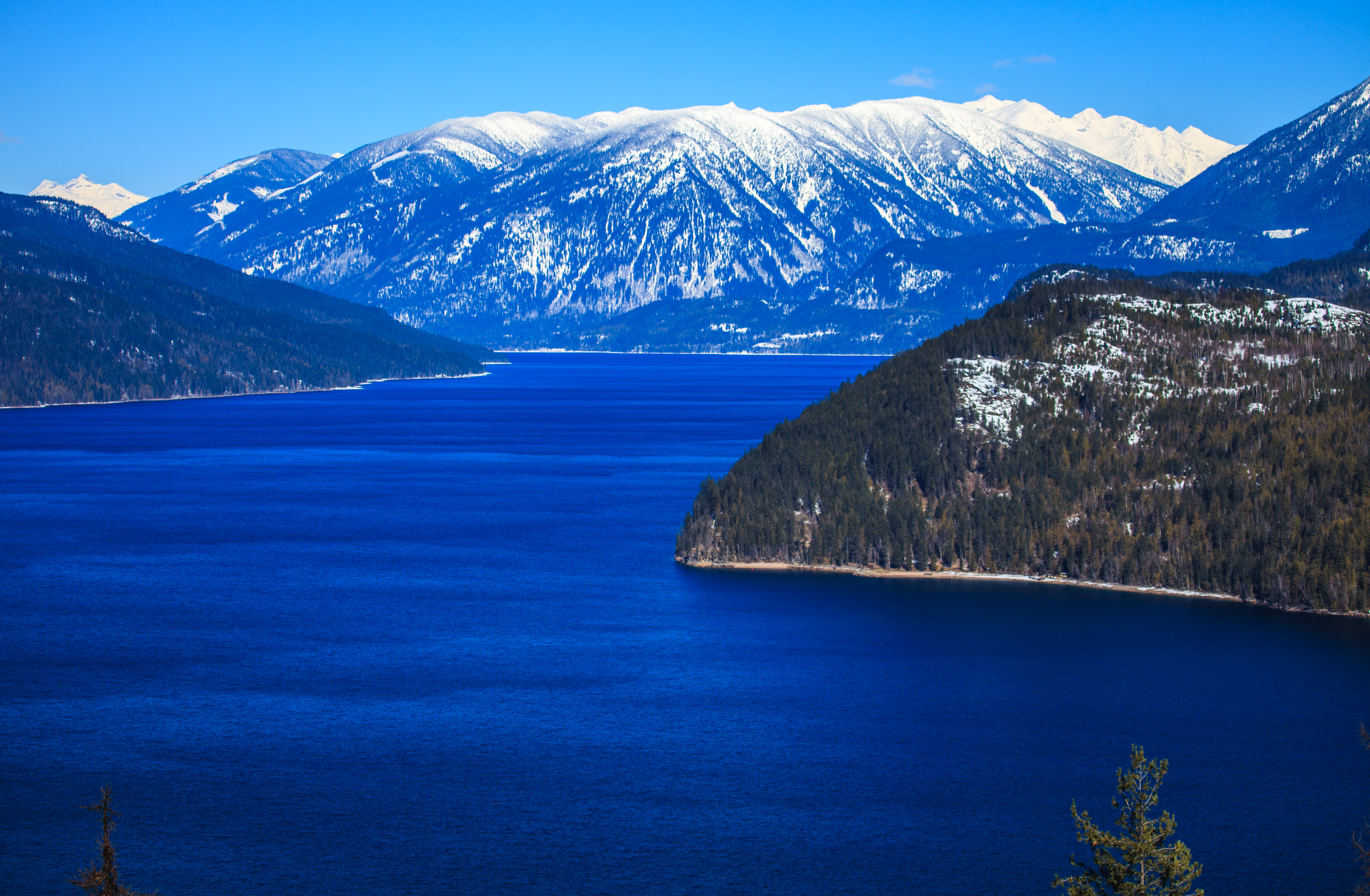
- Slocan Lake

- Location within British Columbia
- Coordinates: 49°41′00″N 117°30′09″W
- Location: Kootenays, British Columbia, Canada

The Slocan Valley is a valley in the West Kootenay region of southeastern British Columbia.

== Geographical boundaries ==
The Slocan Valley is about 100 kilometres (62 mi) long, but its width is undefined. The Valhalla Range provides the steep western boundary and the Slocan Range presents the gradual slopes of the eastern boundary. Squeezed in between, Slocan Lake occupies the north, and Slocan River the south. In the Selkirk Mountains, which were created 200 million years ago during the Jurassic period, the valley forms part of the 400-kilometre (250 mi) long Kootenay Arc, comprising sedimentary, volcanic and metamorphic rock.

The earliest recorded use of the descriptor Slocan valley was 1891, and capitalized use was 1897. The name is not recognized officially by the BC Geographic Names office. The exact geographic boundaries are ill-defined, being either greater or smaller than the drainages of Slocan Lake and the Slocan River. It definitely includes from Crescent Valley north to Hills, and possibly east to Retallack. Unclear fringe settlements include South Slocan, Krestova, Pass Creek, and Summit Lake. Shoreacres (formerly Slocan Crossing), at the mouth of the Slocan River, is not generally considered to be in the Slocan. Although Highway 31A between New Denver and Kaslo is called the Valley of the Ghosts (ghost towns), only the western part is in the Slocan. Some may define that part as no further east than Sandon.

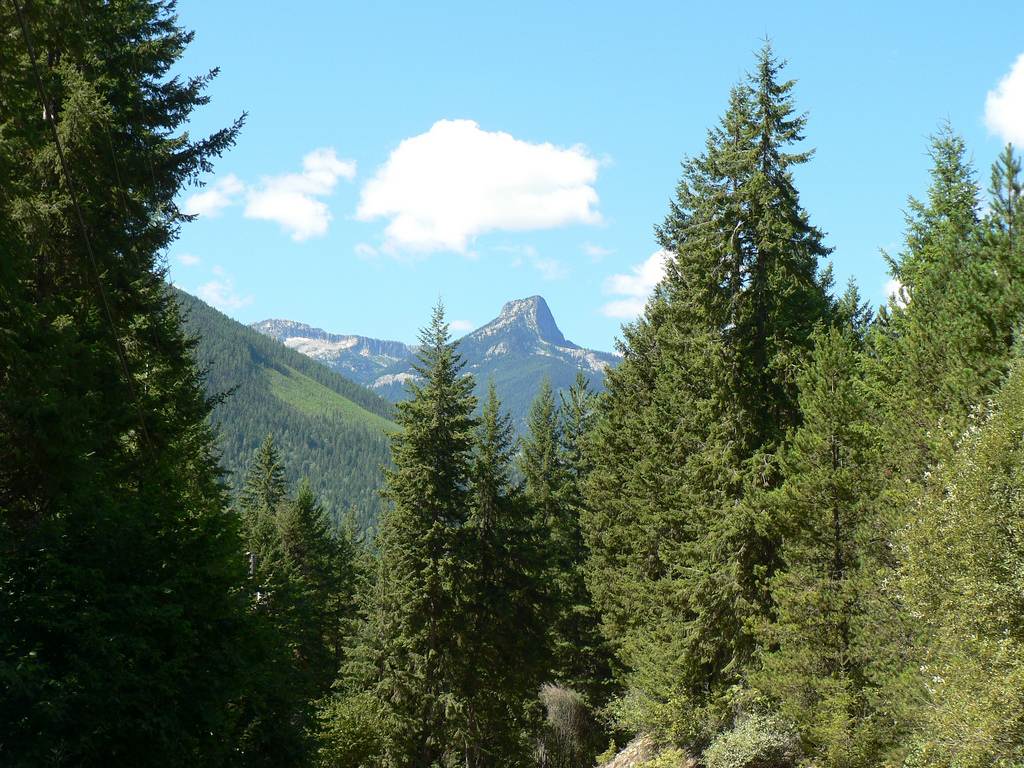
Sacred to Sinixt people, Frog Mountain, Slocan Valley.

The valley is definitely home to the villages of Slocan, Silverton, and New Denver, as well as the unincorporated communities of Crescent Valley, Slocan Park, Passmore, Vallican, Winlaw, Appledale, Perry Siding, Lemon Creek, Rosebery, and Hills.

Valhalla Provincial Park lies on the western side of the upper valley, and is adjoined on its south by the valley of the Little Slocan River. East of Slocan Lake are mining ghost towns such as Sandon, Cody, and Three Forks.

== First nations ==
The Sinixt and Ktunaxa peoples have occupied the valley for thousands of years, and parts are subject to ongoing treaty talks. First Nations built camps and burial grounds in the south. The word slocan is derived from the word meaning "pierce, strike on the head", a reference to the harpooning of salmon (see Slocan name origin).

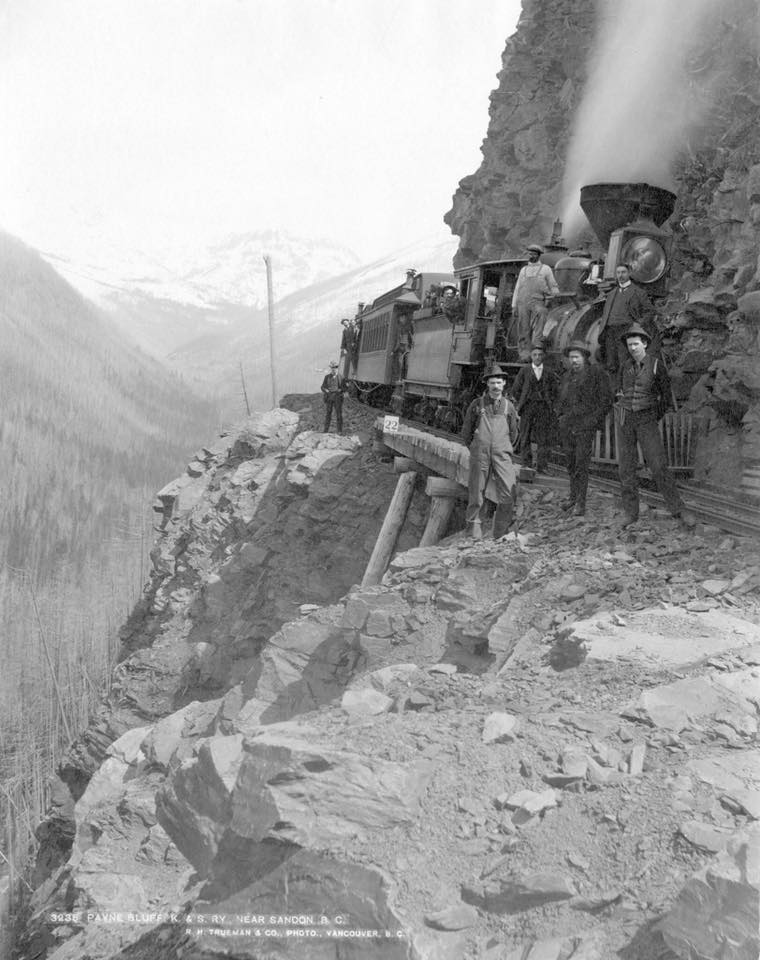
K&SR, Payne Bluff above Sandon, c.1910.

== Mining ==
The north end of the valley saw a mining boom. When rich silver-lead ore was discovered near Sandon in the early 1890s, thousands of prospectors arrived in the valley. Several smaller settlements sprang up along present Highway 31A, linking New Denver and Kaslo. By 1910, many of these were deserted and ultimately vanished. Some larger silver-base metals mines produced through to the 1980s (see Slocan mining).

== Railway and ferry ==
The Canadian Pacific Railway operated two former railway lines connected by the former Slocan Lake ferry (see Slocan railway, ferry and roads).

== Farming and Doukhobors ==
Like First Nations before them, early pioneers recognized the fertile land of the lower valley was prime for settlement. The most prominent of the early farmers were the Doukhobors. In 1908, settling in Brilliant, colonies spread outward, which included the south end of the valley. Many descendants remain residents. Small private farms, some originally started by Doukhobors, produce organic fruit and vegetables for local farmer's markets, restaurants, grocery stores and food processors.

For decades, the valley has been home to craft cannabis cultivation. Many existing operations have transitioned to the now legal industry, and new entrants can benefit from the infrastructure already in place. In 2021, growers are establishing a processing co-op.

== British orchardists ==
In the 1910s, came the British immigrants lured with a dream of establishing small commercial orchards. Apples were a favourite crop. Unfortunately, the climate, often coupled with steeply sloping land, dashed these hopes. Today, few of those orchards remain.

== Japanese internment ==
Several West Kootenay internment centres housed thousands of Japanese Canadians removed from the BC coast during World War II. In the valley, these camps stretched from Lemon Creek in the south to Rosebery in the north, and Sandon in the east. Many internees stayed on after the war ended (see Slocan Japanese internment).

== Back to the land and home-based businesses ==
The back-to-the-land movement peaked in the 1970s. The movement largely comprised hippies and many U.S. draft dodgers of the Vietnam War era. Some people still choose to live off grid or in a commune.

The era led to the growth of artisans, in skills such as theatre, writing, painting, ceramics, and textiles. Locally made natural soaps, wellness products and clothing are sold online. A team of ice and sand sculpturers have adopted the valley as a base.

== Urban escapees ==
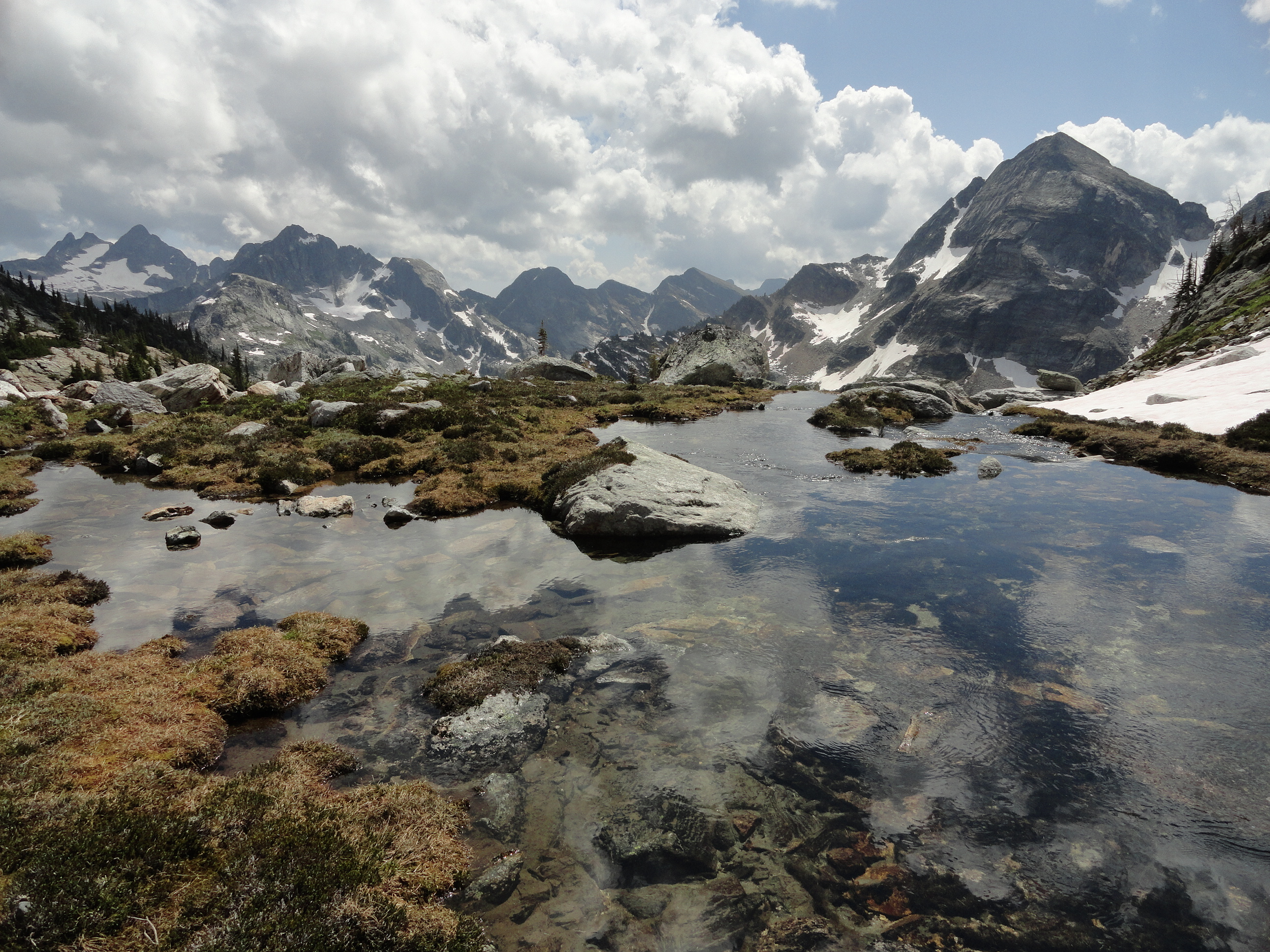
Gregorio Peak, Valhalla Provincial Park, 2012.

Since the mid-1960s, city dwellers have been attracted by the rural lifestyle and lower accommodation costs. People can work remotely via improved cell networks, internet connectivity, and by 2023, increased high speed coverage through a fibre optic network extension. Many residents commute daily to larger centres like Nelson, Castlegar, and Nakusp.

== Tourism ==
Popular activities include mountain biking, rafting on the Slocan River, back country skiing, rock climbing at the Slocan Bluffs, and visiting Valhalla Provincial Park. Golf games are far cheaper than urban centres. Independent tourism operators host many of these pursuits.

Giant cedars exist in small pockets throughout the valley, including on the accessible Retallack Old Growth Cedar Trail. Timber harvesting was once central to the economy.
