= Lemon Creek, British Columbia =

Unincorporated community in British Columbia, Canada

Coordinates: 49°42′00″N 117°29′00″W

Lemon Creek is an unincorporated community on the east side of the Slocan River in the West Kootenay region of southeastern British Columbia. The locality is on BC Highway 6 about 8 kilometres (5 mi) south of Slocan, and 62 kilometres (39 mi) north of Castlegar.

== Townsites ==
The settlement was named after the creek, which recognized Robert E. Lemon, a prominent Nelson merchant. In 1892, a substantial bridge was built across the creek, as part of the trail up the Slocan Valley. At the time, the naming of the creek likely acknowledged Lemon's contribution toward funding the project.

In 1896, a townsite was staked at the mouth of the creek. The next year, about a mile up the creek, another settlement with a hotel was established. Named Del Monte, it was the place at which the proposed railway line was expected to cross. Instead that year, the line crossed near the creek mouth, and Del Monte disappeared. A further townsite surveyed that year was 24 kilometres (15 mi) up the creek, at the confluence with Summit Creek. Primarily to serve gold mining in the area, it was called Summit or just Lemon Creek. If a functional access trail ever existed, by 1901 this was no longer the case. In 1904, the abandoned site reverted to the government.

In 1898, the Oro Gold Mining and Milling Co. surveyed the Oro townsite even farther up the creek, at the confluence with Crusader Creek. A sawmill, stamp mill, mine office, and assay office existed for a couple of years. In 1904, the site also reverted to the government. Sometimes called Lemon City, this name was also used for a work camp that existed during the Canadian Pacific Railway's construction of the Columbia and Kootenay Railway (C&K). Nothing more is known of an access road being built to Oro in 1937.

The creek mouth townsite became better known as Lemon Creek Siding, or just Lemon Siding. However, Lemonton was sometimes used. A sawmill operated. Nowadays, several scattered residences and a campground exist.

== Mining production ==
The Chapleau property, about 6 kilometres (4 mi) southeast of Slocan, was one of the first active properties in the Lemon Creek area. In 1896, the initial shipment of ore yielded 435 grams of gold and 11,788 grams of silver. Until 1900, development was rapid and an aerial tramway and stamp mill were erected. In 1904, the mine closed. Intermittent production 1896–1941 totalled 297 tonnes, yielding 407,604 grams of silver and 29,455 grams of gold.

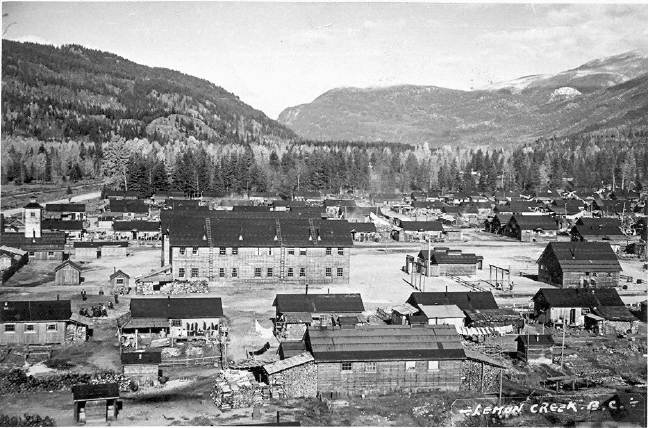
Internment Camp, Lemon Creek, 1940s

== Japanese internment during World War II ==
Built 1942–43 on the leased Harris Ranch, Lemon Creek was the largest of the nine West Kootenay internment camps for Japanese Canadians during World War II, following their removal from the British Columbia Coast. Other West Kootenay internment centres were at Slocan, New Denver, Rosebery, Sandon, Kaslo, Greenwood and Midway.

== Train stop ==
The station was 4.2 kilometres (2.6 mi) north of Perrys, and 8.2 kilometres (5.1 mi) south of Slocan on the C&K. The final passenger train was about 1957, and the line closed to all traffic in 1993.

Train Timetables (Regular stop or Flag stop)
Year	1898	1907	1918	1929	1935	1943	1948	1954	1955
Ref.									
Type	Flag	Flag	Flag	Flag	Flag	Flag	Flag	Flag	Flag

== See also ==
- "1899 Kootenay map". www.library.ubc.ca. p. 1.
