= Three Forks, British Columbia =

Three Forks
- Location of Three Forks in British Columbia
- Coordinates: 50°01′00″N 117°17′00″W
- Country: Canada
- Province: British Columbia
- Region: Slocan Valley, West Kootenay
- Regional district: Central Kootenay
- Area codes: 250, 778, 236, & 672
- Highways: Highway 31A

Three Forks is a ghost town at the junction of Carpenter, Seaton, and Kane creeks in the West Kootenay region of southeastern British Columbia. This former mining community, on BC Highway 31A, is by road about 8 kilometres (5 mi) east of New Denver and 38 kilometres (24 mi) west of Kaslo.

== Strategic location ==
Well positioned as a stopover for horse packtrains carrying ore from the surrounding mines to New Denver, a number of entrepreneurs attempted to secure this land but each failed. In October 1891, John A. Watson sought 129 hectares (320 acres). Later that year, Billy Lynch laid out a townsite. In January 1892, Eli Carpenter filed his notice for the same ground, but by that time the government had reserved all Crown land within ten miles of Slocan Lake for agricultural purposes. In June 1892, Charles Hugonin and Eric Conway Carpenter preempted 65 hectares (160 acres) for agriculture, but instead erected a hotel. Having leased out the venture, the pair built a further hotel the next year. They sold their land interest to Frank S. Barnard and John A. Mara, who later failed to secure a Crown grant, because a preexisting mining claim encumbered the property.

== Railway ==
In October 1894, the rail head of the Nakusp and Slocan Railway (N&S), a Canadian Pacific Railway subsidiary, arrived. Hundreds of tons of ore, which had been hauled along trails from mines awaited to be shipped out. Infrastructure included a turntable and two-stall roundhouse.

In late 1895, Sandon became the terminal for two railways, when the N&S was extended from Three Forks, and the Kaslo and Slocan Railway (K&S), a Great Northern Railway subsidiary, was completed from Kaslo. Payne Bluff/Bailey's siding on the K&S, over 800 feet (244 m) above, was connected to Three Forks by a trail.

Passenger travel northeast of Rosebery ceased in 1933. Damage from the 1955 floods on Carpenter Creek ended all traffic east of Denver Canyon.

Train Timetables (Regular stop or Flag stop)
Year	1898	1907	1914	1929	1932
Ref.					
Type	Regular	Regular	Regular	Regular	Regular

== Early community ==
Apart from the hotel, a general store, furnishing store, and livery opened in 1892. A post office operated 1893–1909, 1911–1917, and in 1921. In March 1894, a townsite was laid out, with the 240 lots occupying three benches. A police constable was in residence. The next month, a Crown grant was issued, likely influenced by the coming railway. When a forest fire destroyed all the buildings in July, far more were erected over the following months. The Three Forks Slocan Prospector newspaper was published December 1894–April 1895. By January 1895, a restaurant, laundry, bathhouse, drugstore, two butchers, three general stores, hotels, and a jail existed. At the climax of prosperity, the Brunswick, Black's, Richelieu, Wilmington, Slocan, and Miner's Exchange hotels operated. After the N&S extension opened, Sandon grew at the expense of Three Forks. By 1900, many buildings were empty. By 1910, only a hotel and general store existed. By 1918, only the store remained but likely closed a few years later with the post office.

== Present site ==
An interpretive sign stands in a clearing, but scattered remnants are hidden beneath the surrounding undergrowth. The Rosebery to Three Forks Regional Trail (Galena Trail) intersects the site. A flower shop and associated farm operate at the road junction.

== Television ==
Three Forks was featured on the historical television series Gold Trails and Ghost Towns, Season 3, Episode 5.
