= Nashton, British Columbia =

Nashton
- Location of Nashton in British Columbia
- Coordinates: 49°55′15″N 116°59′10″W
- Country: Canada
- Province: British Columbia

Nashton is a ghost town in the West Kootenay region of southeastern British Columbia. The location is about 8 kilometres (5 mi) west of Kaslo on Highway 31A, at the confluence of Keen Creek and the Kaslo River. Prior names were Nashville, South Fork and Zwicky.

== 1892 subdivision ==
Like other speculative endeavours, the town was promoted as being on the coming Kaslo and Slocan Railway. Companies like the Great Northern Railway usually bypassed such places at the time of construction.

In 1892, John Keen auctioned the 274 lots, but their being deserted in 1895 indicates buyer interest. He named Nashville after his bride-to-be, Sarah Helena Nash Twiss. The Nashville Hotel at South Fork operated 1897–1902. South Fork, the name of the nearest railway stop, was also known as Nashville Siding. South Fork became the shipping centre for mines such as Alice-Utica, Cork-Province, Montezuma and Mexico.

== 1908 subdivision ==
In a 1908 rebirth, John Keen subdivided the townsite into orchard properties. When the Canadian Pacific Railway reopened the route as standard gauge in 1913, the siding was called Zwicky, after William Edward Zwicky, manager of the Cork-Province mine. Lobbying from residents ensured the post office that opened in 1915 was named Nashton. Stagecoaches, such as Scott, Baker, and Company, passed through the hamlet. The few remaining residents in 1940 had deserted by 1950.

== 1994 revival ==
New Westminster-based Niho Land & Cattle Company Ltd. bought Nashton in 1994 and has sold lots mostly to RVers.

Nowadays, the name survives in Nashton Creek, which was formerly Cedar Creek and Come Again Creek. The former post office building is used for storage. A few buildings remain, and some new residents live at the former site. It is the unofficial gateway to BC's Valley of the Ghosts.
