= Retallack, British Columbia =

Retallack
- Location of Retallack in British Columbia
- Coordinates: 50°03′00″N 117°08′00″W
- Country: Canada
- Province: British Columbia
- Region: West Kootenay
- Regional district: Central Kootenay
- Area codes: 250, 778, 236, & 672
- Highway: Highway 31A

Retallack is on the north side of the Kaslo River, west of the junction with Whitewater Creek, in the West Kootenay region of southeastern British Columbia. The settlement, on Highway 31A, is about 37 kilometres (23 mi) northwest of Kaslo and 20 kilometres (12 mi) northeast of New Denver.

== Bell family ==
In the early 1890s, the place was called Bell's Camp, The Bells, Bellsville, or some variation of the latter. James (Jim) Bell, and his sons John Warren Bell, and James Allan Ward Bell, operated a sawmill and were prospectors and miners. When the Kaslo and Slocan Railway opened in 1895, the siding was called Whitewater Creek or The Bells. The creek was named after the mine.

In 1891, prospectors Eli Carpenter and J.L. (Jack) Seaton discovered a silver-lead ore deposit near the source of Slocan Creek, which triggered the mining boom of the following year. Seaton recovered almost a million dollars in ore.

The 1895 approval for Jim Bell to open a post office under the name Bellona was rescinded, when the Kaslo postmaster informed the postal inspector, "Mr. Bell is an honest man, but he is drunk a good part of his time … I also understand that he can hardly write his own name." Two years later, J. Warren Bell was successful in opening the post office as Whitewater. In 1903, Jim burned to death in a cabin fire, and his sons left the area a couple of years later.

== Final rename ==
Major John Ley Retallack leased the Whitewater mine, buying the claim after the 1910 fire that destroyed the camp, and burned railway bridges and snowsheds, ending the Great Northern Railway running of the line. Instrumental in the 1911 revival, the major was acknowledged by Canadian Pacific Railway (CP). On acquiring the line in 1912, CP named the siding Retallack. In due course, the postal authorities followed suit for the settlement. The several hotels in the town catered to the workers at the mine, the second largest silver/lead/zinc operation in the British Empire. After the 1956 mine closure, Retallack soon became a ghost town. However, two bunkhouses from the 1940s survive on the highway.

== Present community ==
Some much later houses border the highway. In 1996, the 1,000-square-metre (11,000 sq ft) timberframe Retallack Lodge was built on a city block of the old townsite. By 2009, Retallack was ranked as one of the best heliskiing operations in the world. Five years later, the enterprise expanded into helibiking.
