= Slocan Park =

- Location of Slocan Park in British Columbia
- Coordinates: 49°31′00″N 117°37′00″W
- Country: Canada
- Province: British Columbia
- Region: Slocan Valley, West Kootenay
- Regional district: Central Kootenay
- Area codes: 250, 778, 236, & 672
- Highway: 6

Slocan Park is an unincorporated community on the east side of the Slocan River in the West Kootenay region of southern British Columbia. The neighbourhood on Highway 6 is about 9 kilometres (6 mi) north of Crescent Valley and 36 kilometres (22 mi) south of Slocan.

== Adjacent communities ==
From north to south, Park, Koch, and Whiteley & Murray sidings were in close proximity on the former Slocan branch of the Columbia and Kootenay Railway (part of the Canadian Pacific Railway). In 1901, Park siding became Gutelius siding. However, the post office that opened near Whiteley & Murray siding in 1903 was named Gutelius. Initially unchanged, the siding was named after John Murray and his mining partner Bill Whiteley. In 1907, a real estate development near this siding was promoted as Slocan Park. To prevent confusion, the siding also became Slocan Park in 1910, but the post office was not renamed until 1912. Meanwhile, Gutelius siding became Passmore.

== Koch Siding ==
Koch Siding, now considered part of Slocan Park, was once a distinct place. William Carl Earnest (Billy) Koch built a sawmill at this location around 1906. Koch sold his mill to the Doukhobors, who erected a community hall and bunkhouses for mill workers. The location developed as one of the many Doukhobor communities established across the region.

== River crossings ==
A wooden swinging footbridge existed from early times. Later a ferry operated at least 1922–1943. At one time, this helped the Kootenay-Slocan Fruit Co. Ltd. sell orchard lots on the west side of the river. After the ferry withdrawal, the earlier footbridge remained the only crossing. A wooden road bridge was built in 1956. Washed out in 1968, it was replaced by a Bailey bridge, and the present steel bridge in 1984. In 1975, the swinging bridge was restored.

== Present community ==
Nowadays, Slocan Park is largely an agricultural and residential community of about 120 households, which includes a co-operative grocery and gas outlet, and a local credit union branch. Much of the diverse population came from Alberta and other parts of BC.
