= Slocan, British Columbia =

Slocan
- Village
- Village of Slocan

- Location of Slocan in British Columbia
- Coordinates: 49°45′58″N 117°28′6″W
- Country: Canada
- Province: British Columbia
- Region: Slocan Valley, West Kootenay
- Regional district: Central Kootenay
- Incorporated: 1901 then 1958

Government
  - Governing body: Slocan Village Council
  - Mayor: Jamie Ingram

Area
  - Total: 0.78 km^{2} (0.30 sq mi)
- Elevation: 450 m (1,480 ft)

Population (2021)
  - Total: 379
  - Density: 381.7/km^{2} (989/sq mi)
- Time zone: UTC−07:00 (PT)
- Area codes: 250, 778, 236, & 672
- Highways: Highway 6
- Waterways: Slocan Lake, Slocan River
- Website: Official website

The Village of Slocan is in the West Kootenay region of southeastern British Columbia. The former steamboat landing and ferry terminal is at the mouth of Springer Creek, at the foot of Slocan Lake. The locality, on BC Highway 6 is about 69 kilometres (43 mi) by road north of Castlegar and 183 kilometres (114 mi) by road and ferry south of Revelstoke.

== Name origin ==
Slocan (/sloʊˈkæn/ sloh-KAN) is from Ktunaxa sⱡuqan, [sɬuqan]), or the related (/slhuˈkin/ (Sinixt slogan). The meaning is "to pierce, strike on the head," in the context of spearing salmon. It likely derived from the Okanagan-Colville term.

The name has been used officially for several geographical features, such as communities, rivers, lakes, a whirlpool, and mountain. Slocan became the accepted anglicized version of the wide variety of other spellings, the earliest of which was Shlogan River in 1859. The present spelling was first used in 1884.

In 1891, Crown land purchases included 160 acres (65 ha) by James Delaney and Thomas M. Ward at the lakeshore, 320 acres (130 ha) by Harry H. Ward (Tom's brother) 5 kilometres (3 mi) south, and 160 acres (65 ha) by Arthur C. Dick 0.8 kilometres (0.5 mi) south of the lake. All four were likely involved in establishing the townsite. Appearing about the same time as New Denver, a community mid-way up the lake's eastern shore that was also briefly called Slocan City or Slocan in 1892, it is unclear how one prevailed in keeping the name.

== Mining ==
After the initial activity at Sandon, prospectors extended their range of exploration to the south and west. Locating the Dayton claim in 1893, Billy Springer staked the property. Being the first on a creek lacking a name, he designated it as Springer Creek. A mining rush came in 1895. By 1906, many of the mines had closed. However, small-scale mining remained viable for many years because of the richness of the ores. Around Slocan City, more than half of the 125 occurrences were mineral producers, and 13 mines produced more than 1 million grams of silver.

The Arlington mine, near the confluence of Speculator and Springer creeks, 8 kilometres (5 mi) east-northeast was worked extensively 1899–1903, then intermittently until 1979. Production totalled 20,592 tonnes, yielding 31,429,872 grams of silver, 861,487 kilograms of lead, 118,863 kilograms of zinc, 743 grams of gold, 834 kilograms of copper, and 46 kilograms of cadmium.

The Dayton mine, near the mouth of Dayton Creek, 3 kilometres (2 mi) east-northeast had intermittent production 1903–1935 that totalled 17 tonnes, yielding 12,224 grams of silver, 93 grams of gold, and 1,006 kilograms of lead.

The Enterprise mine, near the confluence of Enterprise and Neepawa creeks, 11 kilometres (7 mi) northeast produced 1896–1930, 1941–1953, and intermittently until 1977. Mined were 11,067 tonnes of ore, yielding 32,676,718 grams of silver, 1,674 tonnes of lead, 1,068 tonnes of zinc, 2,041 grams of gold, 445 kilograms of cadmium, and 149 kilograms of copper.

The Little Tim mine, at the head of Little Tim Creek, 8 kilometres (5 mi) northeast had intermittent production 1905–1984 that resulted in 5,116 tonnes, yielding 1,366,013 grams of silver, 11 grams of gold, 26,339 kilograms of lead, 8,536 kilograms of zinc, and 171 kilograms of copper.

The Meteor property, at the head of Tobin Creek, 8 kilometres (5 mi) east was worked intermittently. Total production 1897–1967 was 2,659 tonnes yielding 4,724,994 grams of silver, 13,177 grams of gold, and a small amount of lead and zinc.

The Ottawa mine, on the north slope of the Springer Creek valley, 5 kilometres (3 mi) northeast, during 1903–1984 produced 26,476 tonnes, yielding 55,940,682 grams of silver, 982 grams of gold, 360,085 kilograms of lead, 12,774 kilograms of zinc, and 793 kilograms of copper.

The Slocan Prince property, at the head of Crusader Creek, 10 kilometres (6 mi) east, during 1896–1970 produced 1,754 tonnes containing 7,045,304 grams of silver, 128,781 kilograms of lead, and 11,852 kilograms of zinc.

The Westmont property, on the north slope of the Enterprise Creek valley, 12.5 kilometres (7.8 mi) northeast, was worked continually 1907–1914, intermittently, and continually 1971–1980. Production totalled 3,211 tonnes, yielding 11,084,830 grams of silver, 2,058 grams of gold, 199,781 kilograms of lead, 65,920 kilograms of zinc, 54 kilograms of copper, and 68 kilograms of cadmium.

== Early community ==
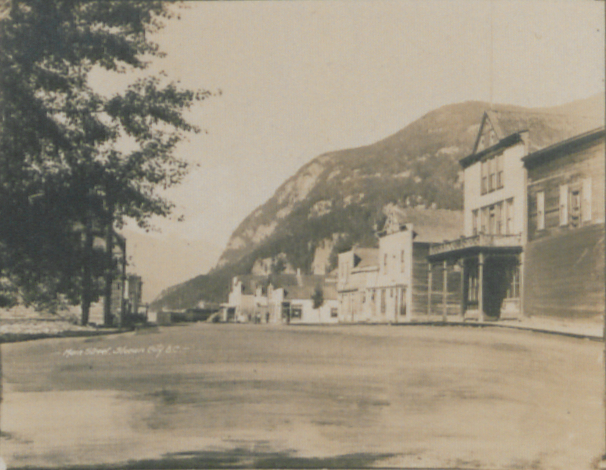
Slocan City, 1920

Although lot sales began in 1892, the construction of the Lake View Hotel appeared the only activity. A townsite plan was registered in 1897, apparently delayed by an investor dispute. That year, the name changed from Slocan City to Slocan at the insistence of postal authorities. However, the province and Canadian Pacific Railway (CP) continued using the former name. The town incorporated as a city in June 1901, and the population was over 1,500.

The northeast corner developed as the hamlet of Brandon, separated by woods. In 1896, William H. Brandon preempted 160 acres. He sold building lots the next year, and surveyed in 1898. However, the business district largely relocated to Slocan proper, physically skidding the buildings. By 1902, 134 unsold lots and an open acreage were sold off cheaply. The two communities never amalgamated, and Brandon remains outside the Slocan village limits.

By 1900, 12 hotels operated in Slocan, but by 1920 only 3 remained. In 1906, the city was placed in receivership. By 1931, only 202 people remained, falling to 177 a decade later. The Women's Institute played a vital role in the welfare of residents and those serving in the armed services during the world wars. On closing in 2015, Slocan was the last chapter of the Institute operating in the West Kootenay.

In the early 1950s, Slocan claimed to be the smallest incorporated city in North America. In June 1958, Slocan reincorporated as a village to receive provincial funding for road maintenance, schools, and policing.

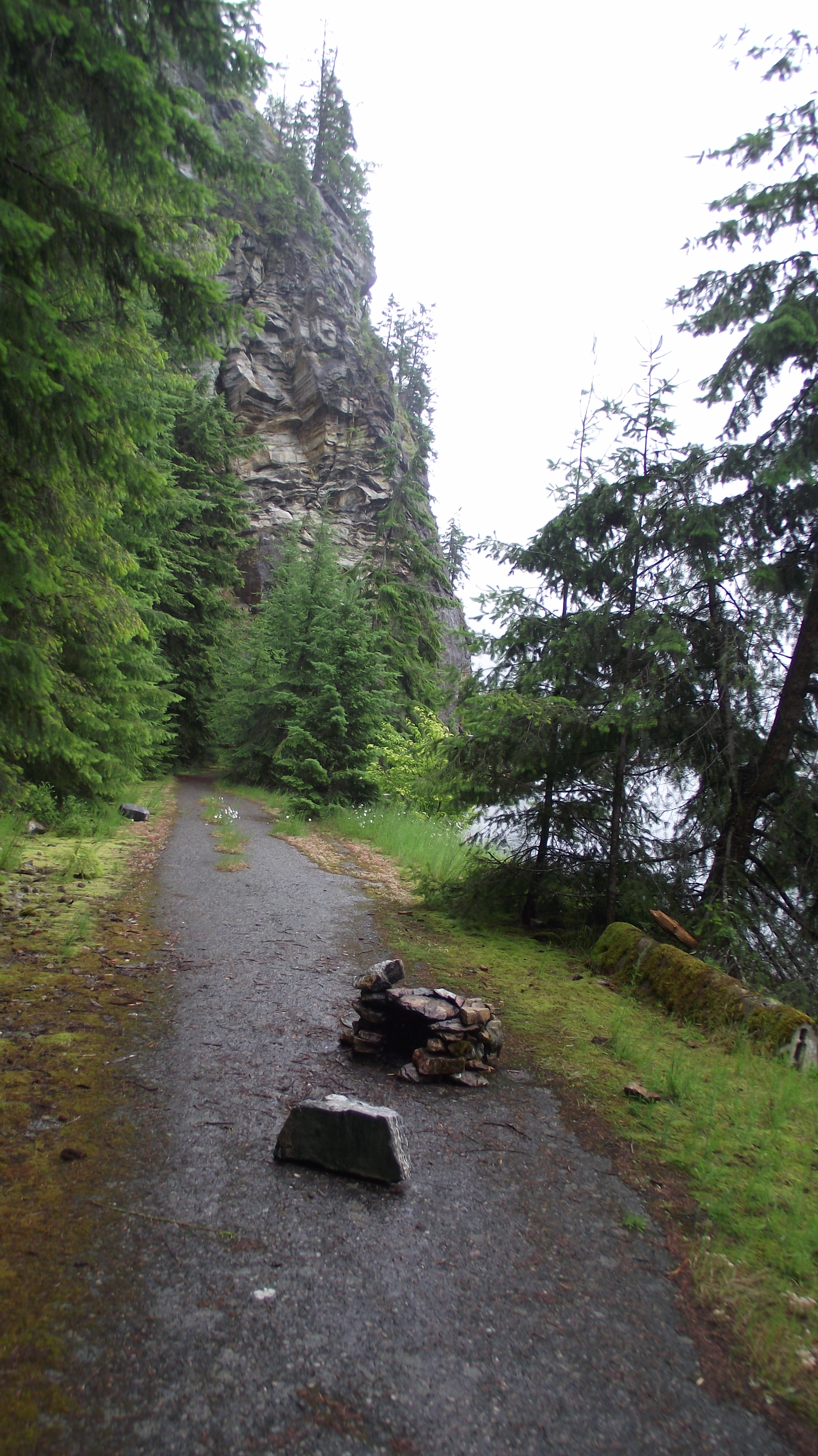
Old Slocan Highway along the shore, 2012

== Railway, ferry and roads ==
The transshipment of ore from the foot of the lake was initially northward via Rosebery, which connected northward with the CP Nakusp & Slocan Railway to Nakusp on the Upper Arrow Lake. There, a further steamboat to Arrowhead linked to a branch of the CP main line. In 1897, the CP Columbia and Kootenay Railway (C&KR) branch line from South Slocan opened, reversing the ore flow southward.

In 1928, the one-lane road (with pull outs) north to Silverton opened, heralding the beginning of the end for lake traffic. Passenger service on the lake ferry ended in 1954. The final freight run was either December 1988 or March 1989. However, by the 1960s, the service had reduced to twice weekly, and once weekly by 1980.

On the C&KR branch, passenger service ended around 1957 and abandonment to all traffic was in 1993, the rail bed since becoming the Slocan Valley Rail Trail.

In 1973, a new road bypassed the former Slocan–Silverton road. Prior to widening in 1989, the highway was hazardous. In 2011, the south entrance to the former road tunnel, just north of Slocan, collapsed. Hikers on the popular walking trail now have to clamber over the rubble pile to pass this point.

== Japanese internment ==
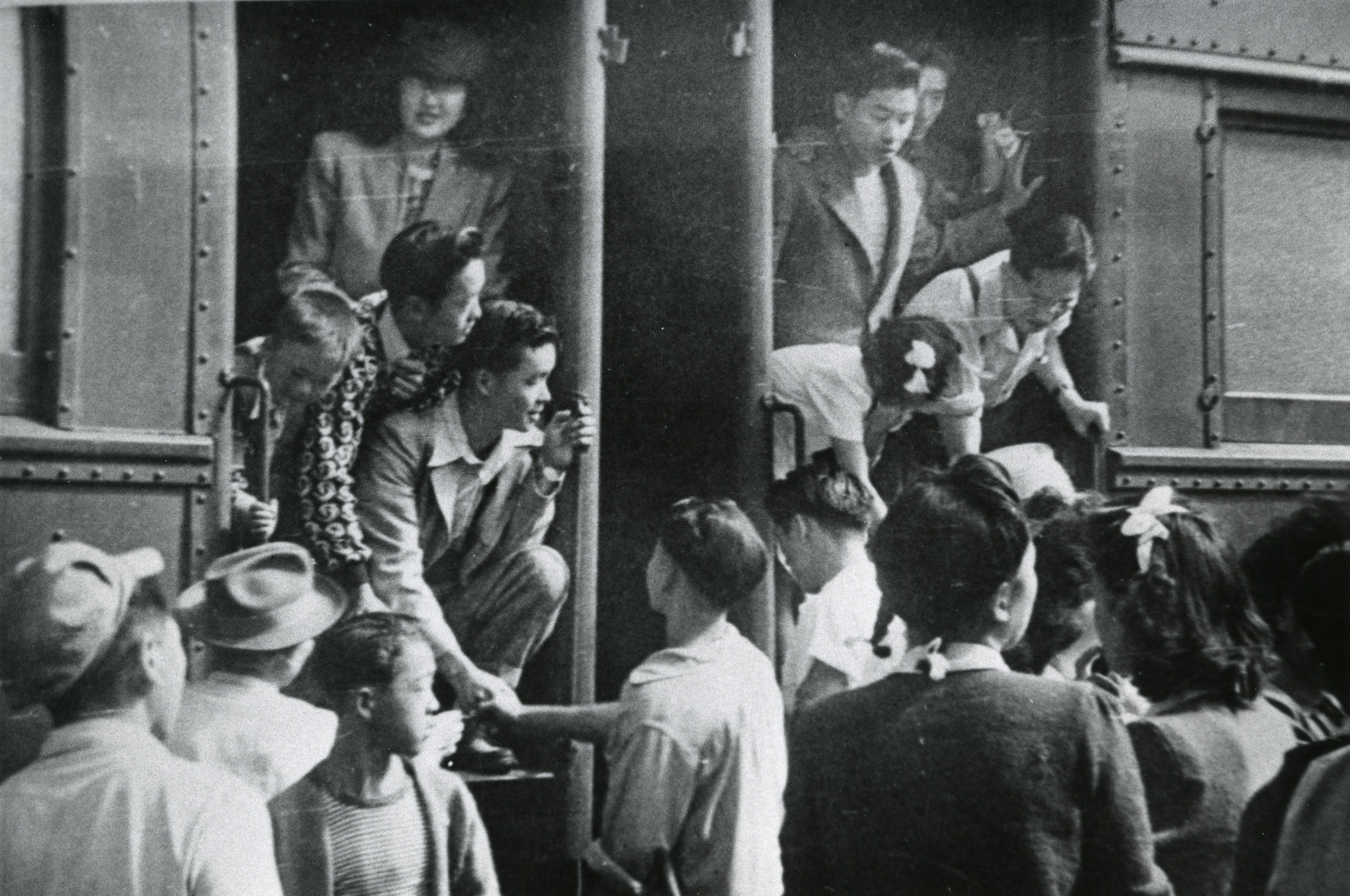
Internees on train, Slocan City, 1940s

Slocan was one of the West Kootenay internment camps housing Japanese Canadians removed from the BC coast during World War II. Swelling the existing meagre population, thousands of internees found a range of work in existing or new businesses, and several who permanently settled owned enterprises.

The Slocan centre comprised 595 internees at the end of 1942. Slocan was also a departure point for those who were sent to Japan in 1946. The leased Popoff farm, about 4 kilometres (2 mi) south, housed around 1,000. Operating 1943–1946, the camp comprised nearly 100 buildings. Bay Farm, to its north, accommodated 1,376 by the end of 1942. Famous Japanese Canadians who attended the school included architect Raymond Moriyama, environmentalist David Suzuki and Joy Kogawa.

The Popoffs had taken 32 years of hard work and considerable expenditure to develop a productive farm. On regaining their land in 1947, it was a barren landscape littered with gravel and rock. Their claim for $28,000, elicited a response of $9,000 from the federal government to buy the land. The family gave up farming and moved to Vancouver.

Other internment centres in the Slocan region were at Lemon Creek, New Denver, Rosebery, Kaslo and Sandon.

== Present community ==
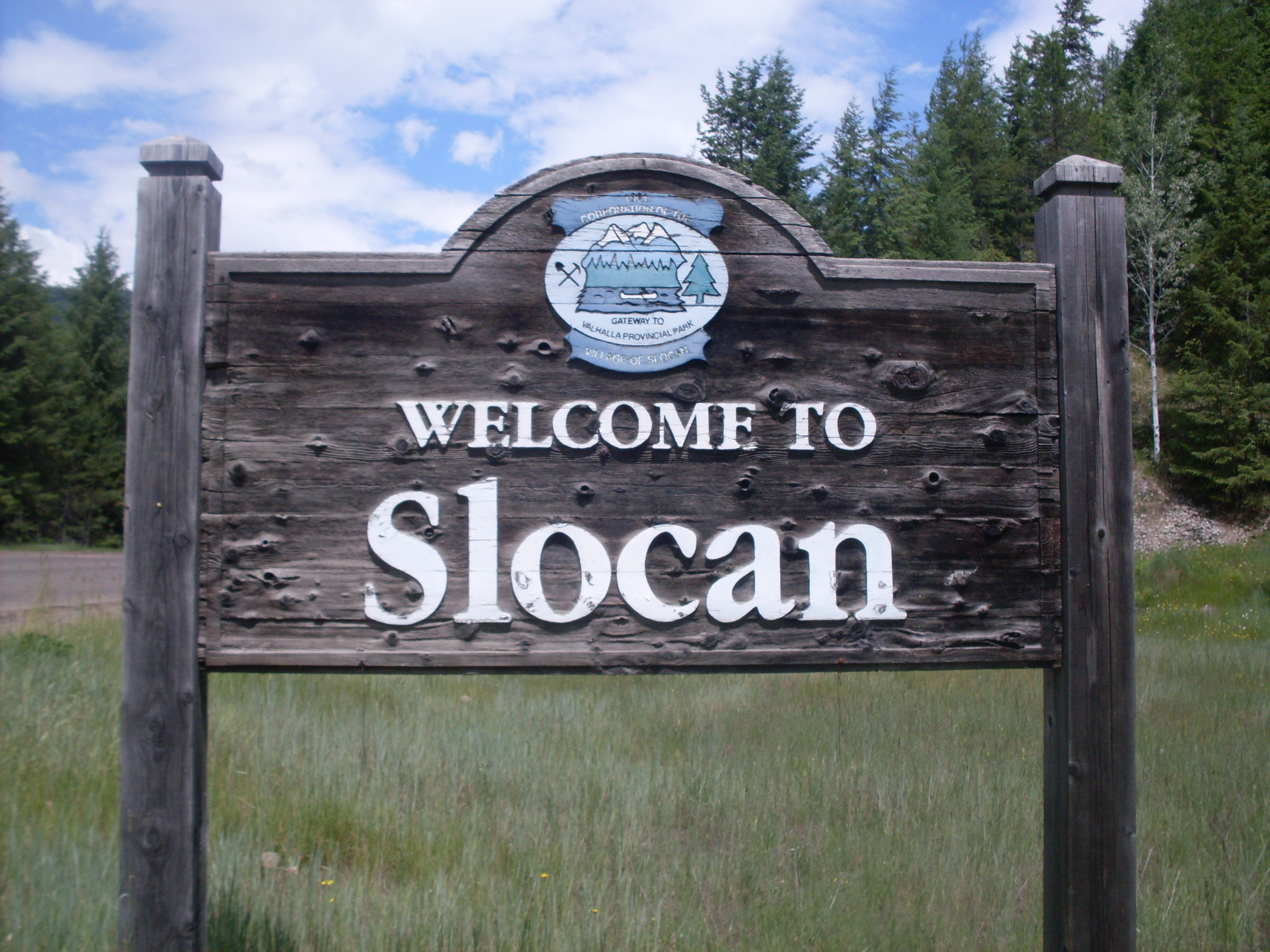
Slocan's welcome sign

Slocan is a launching point for travellers en route to Valhalla Provincial Park. Slocan Beach, with its gazebo and boat launch, hosts public events and provides lake access.

Springer Creek Forest Products was the biggest employer until its closure in 2013. In 2020, the village purchased the former sawmill's nearly 20-acre (8.1 ha) lakeside land for $1.5 million. Public consultation will determine the future use.

A series of waterfalls includes a set that flows through the Springer Creek RV Park & Campground, which is on Giffan Ave, the central access road into Slocan.

== Demographics ==
In the 2021 Census of Population conducted by Statistics Canada, Slocan had a population of 379 living in 184 of its 212 total private dwellings, a change of 31.1% from its 2016 population of 289. With a land area of 0.78 km^{2} (0.30 sq mi), it had a population density of 485.9/km^{2} (1,258.5/sq mi) in 2021.

== Television ==
Slocan City was featured on the history-themed television series Gold Trails and Ghost Towns (season 2, episode 7).

== Climate ==
Slocan has a humid continental climate (Dfb).

Climate data for South Slocan (about 45 kilometres (28 mi) south of Slocan)
Month	Jan	Feb	Mar	Apr	May	Jun	Jul	Aug	Sep	Oct	Nov	Dec	Year
Record high °C (°F)	10.0 (50.0)	14.5 (58.1)	22.5 (72.5)	30.0 (86.0)	35.5 (95.9)	38.0 (100.4)	41.0 (105.8)	39.5 (103.1)	36.1 (97.0)	26.1 (79.0)	17.2 (63.0)	11.7 (53.1)	41.0 (105.8)
Mean daily maximum °C (°F)	−0.2 (31.6)	3.6 (38.5)	9.3 (48.7)	15.5 (59.9)	20.4 (68.7)	24.2 (75.6)	28.0 (82.4)	28.5 (83.3)	21.7 (71.1)	13.8 (56.8)	4.8 (40.6)	0.2 (32.4)	14.1 (57.4)
Daily mean °C (°F)	−3.7 (25.3)	−0.6 (30.9)	3.5 (38.3)	8.3 (46.9)	12.7 (54.9)	16.4 (61.5)	19.1 (66.4)	19.3 (66.7)	13.8 (56.8)	7.6 (45.7)	1.5 (34.7)	−2.9 (26.8)	7.9 (46.2)
Mean daily minimum °C (°F)	−7.1 (19.2)	−4.9 (23.2)	−2.3 (27.9)	1.0 (33.8)	4.9 (40.8)	8.5 (47.3)	10.1 (50.2)	10.0 (50.0)	5.8 (42.4)	1.4 (34.5)	−1.9 (28.6)	−5.9 (21.4)	1.6 (34.9)
Record low °C (°F)	−31.7 (−25.1)	−30.6 (−23.1)	−22.2 (−8.0)	−7.8 (18.0)	−6.1 (21.0)	0.0 (32.0)	2.8 (37.0)	2.2 (36.0)	−4.4 (24.1)	−11.0 (12.2)	−23.5 (−10.3)	−35.0 (−31.0)	−35.0 (−31.0)
Average precipitation mm (inches)	94.0 (3.70)	69.8 (2.75)	62.4 (2.46)	61.0 (2.40)	68.2 (2.69)	71.1 (2.80)	54.4 (2.14)	49.4 (1.94)	51.4 (2.02)	61.6 (2.43)	104.0 (4.09)	105.9 (4.17)	853.2 (33.59)
Average rainfall mm (inches)	39.0 (1.54)	48.4 (1.91)	56.5 (2.22)	60.3 (2.37)	68.2 (2.69)	71.1 (2.80)	54.4 (2.14)	49.4 (1.94)	51.4 (2.02)	59.8 (2.35)	78.9 (3.11)	42.7 (1.68)	680.0 (26.77)
Average snowfall cm (inches)	55.1 (21.7)	21.3 (8.4)	5.9 (2.3)	0.7 (0.3)	0 (0)	0 (0)	0 (0)	0 (0)	0 (0)	1.8 (0.7)	25.2 (9.9)	63.3 (24.9)	173.2 (68.2)
Average precipitation days (≥ 0.2 mm)	14.1	12.7	13.3	12.5	13.7	13.2	10.0	8.8	8.6	11.3	15.1	14.6	147.8
Average rainy days (≥ 0.2 mm)	6.8	8.9	12.4	12.5	13.7	13.2	10.0	8.8	8.6	11.2	12.2	5.7	123.9
Average snowy days (≥ 0.2 cm)	9.2	4.8	1.8	0.24	0	0	0	0	0	0.38	4.9	10.2	31.5
Source: Environment Canada

== See also ==
- List of francophone communities in British Columbia
- "1899 Kootenay map". www.library.ubc.ca. p. 1.
