= Kaslo and Slocan Railway =

Railway in British Columbia, Canada

The Kaslo and Slocan Railway (K&S) is a historic railway that operated in the West Kootenay region of southeastern British Columbia in western Canada. The K&S connected Kaslo and Sandon. Initially a narrow-gauge railway, the line was later rebuilt to standard gauge.

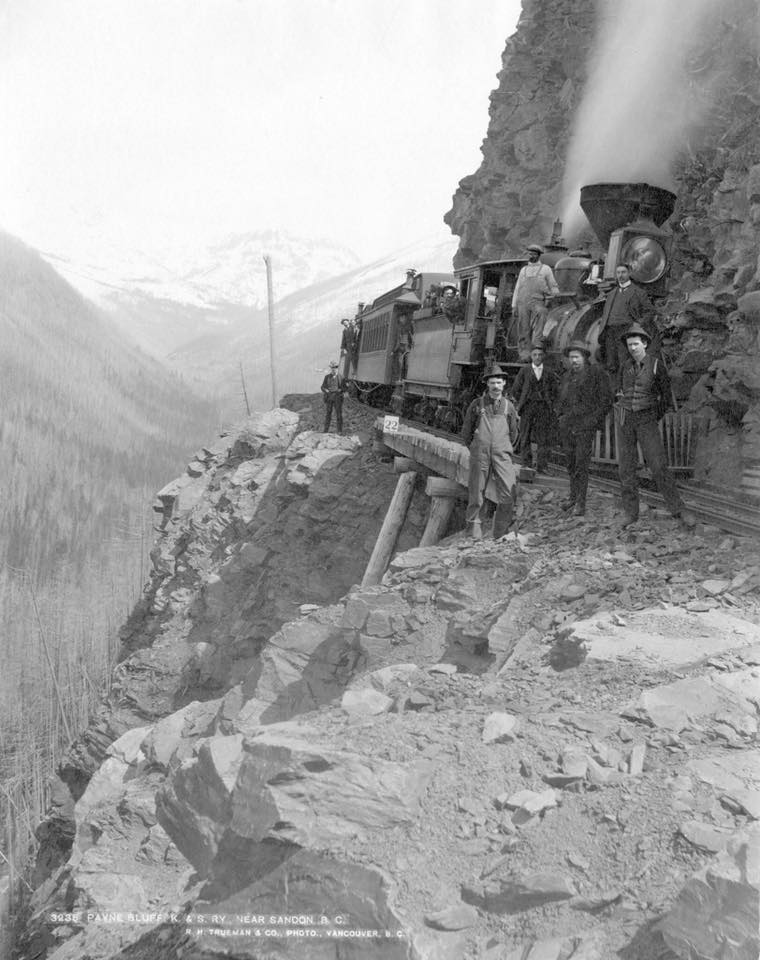
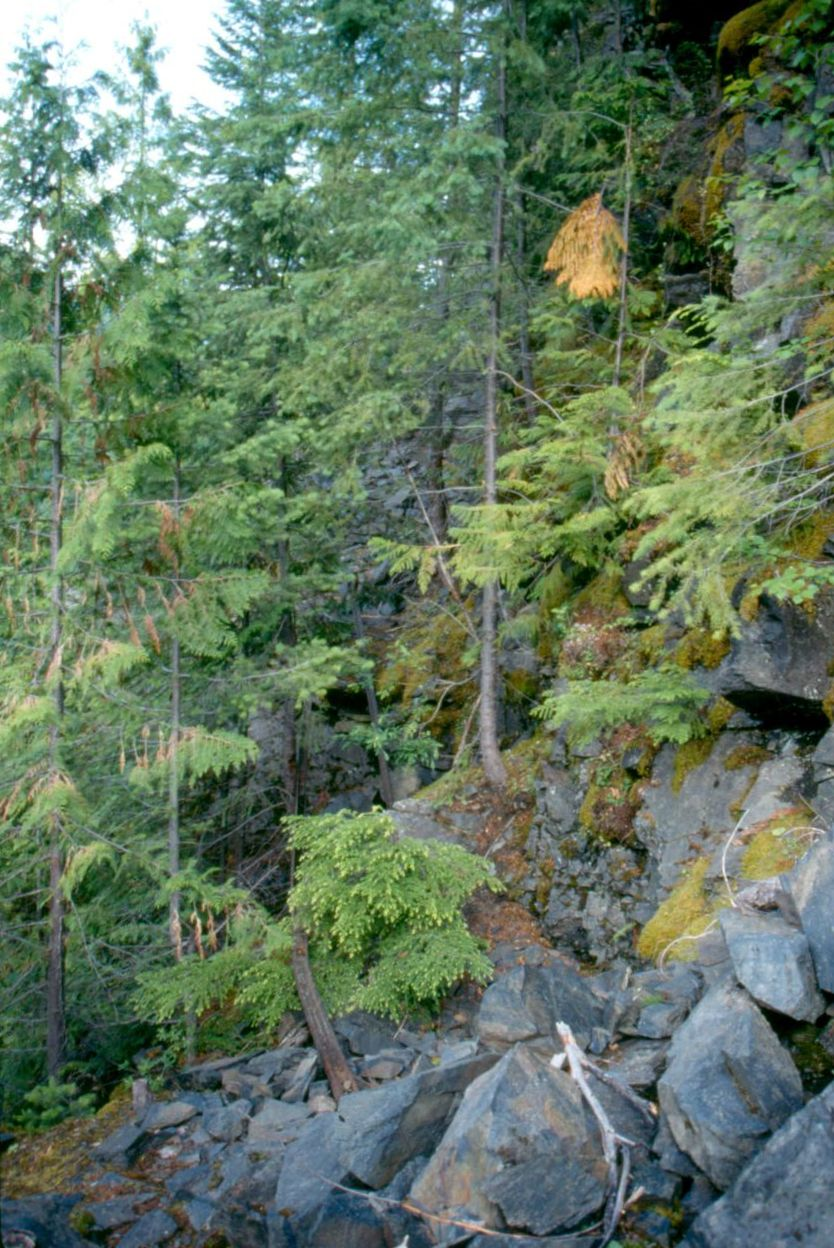
Payne Bluff (above Three Forks), c.1910 ┼ Trestle remnants, Payne Bluff, 1993

== Narrow gauge ==
=== Proposal ===
The 1891 discovery of silver in the Slocan Range created a mining boom. A railway to transport ore was crucial for commercial mining. In 1892, the province issued the charter to promoter John Hendry for a standard gauge line, amended to 1-metre (3 ft) narrow gauge in 1894. Planned was a western terminal at Cody, with a spur to Sandon. The May 1893 stock market collapse and drop in the silver price depressed the economy, which delayed construction and prompted the narrow gauge decision. This choice halved construction costs. Steamboat connections on Kootenay Lake were southward from Kaslo to Five Mile Point (east of Nelson), which linked with the Nelson and Fort Sheppard Railway.

=== Construction ===
In 1893, the Great Northern Railway (GN) agreed to fund the project. Foley Brothers & Guthrie were the principal contractors. Grading began in May 1895. Porter Brothers were the subcontractors for the trestles, the railway wharf at Kaslo, and most of the tracklaying. The westward rail head reached the revised terminal of Sandon that October. The route was 45.4 kilometres (28.2 mi) of which 39.3 kilometres (24.4 mi) attracted a 2,570-hectare-per-kilometre (10,240 acre/mi) land grant.

=== Operation ===
In November 1895, the first ore was carried. The next month, disputes with the N&S, a Canadian Pacific Railway (CP) subsidiary, led to violent confrontations.

Initially offering lower rates than the N&S, the K&S carried over 80 per cent of Slocan ore, but the proximity of track to the mines determined the carrier in most instances. Agreeing to avoid rate wars, a tenuous truce existed.

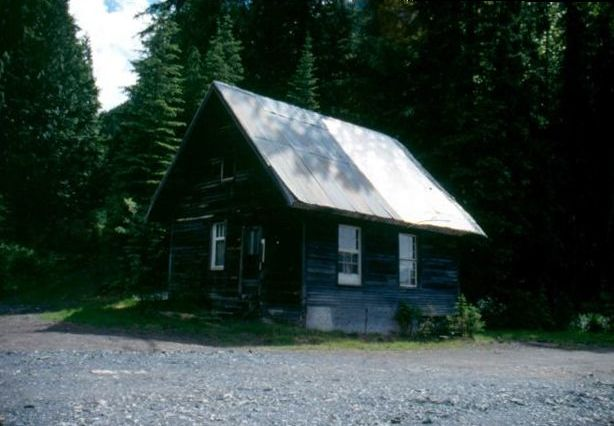
Former station, Cody, BC, 1993

In the absence of snow sheds, avalanches closed the line for days. The route incurred the highest expense per train mile in Canada. The K&S bought the Rio Grande Southern Railroad (RGS) rotary snowplow #1 in February 1897, and the Lucky Jim snowshed was erected in late 1899. However, slides comprising timber, mud, and rock, destroyed trestles and track throughout the life of the line. The Kaslo–Sandon–Cody passenger and freight service was daily, but Sandon–Cody reduced to twice weekly in November 1901.

By 1898, the K&S showed a healthy operating profit. Earnings per train mile ranked among the best in Canada, but costs were among the worst. Consolidating related enterprises, the Kootenay Railway and Navigation Co. (KR&N), a new venture and GN subsidiary, acquired the K&S from the original investors that year. In 1900, apart from 2,857 shares acquired in 1906, the KR&N became a wholly owned GN subsidiary.

=== Demise ===
Declining traffic led to mixed trains by 1902, the final year to achieve an operating profit. In 1904, CP declined an offer to buy the line. The next year, scheduled service to Cody ceased. In May 1908, slides rendered McGuigan Creek bridge unsafe for regular traffic. The final commercial train ran from Sandon that November, making McGuigan the western terminal. In October 1909, temporary bridge repairs reopened the closed section to facilitate the removal of track and sundry infrastructure. In July 1910, a forest fire destroyed almost everything west of Sproule's, which became the revised western terminal. CP having reiterated disinterest in a purchase, GN ceased operations in January 1911.

=== Revival ===
In May 1911, a local syndicate bought the K&S for $25,000. Trains ran throughout the summer as far as Mile 12 and to Sproule's in December and January. Service resumed the following April. CP assumed control in May 1912, but regular service to Sproule's was suspended until July. Operational until just after Christmas, the line also carried materials for the rebuild. Construction trains operated from March 1913 and regular service from June. The remaining narrow gauge equipment was withdrawn around April 1914.

== Standard gauge ==
=== Proposal ===
In fall 1911, a $313,000 reconstruction estimate deterred CP from proceeding. However, the provincial government offered a large cash injection, which comprised a $100,000 grant and the repurchase of land grants elsewhere yielding $1,626,030, less the $25,000 purchase price.

=== Construction ===
Reconstruction commenced from both ends. At Parapet junction, east of Three Forks, the right-of-way doubled back before crossing Seaton Creek. Tracklaying commenced in summer 1912. A steam shovel excavated the grade for Parapet–Zincton, which opened in September 1912. After a hiatus exceeding two years, the Lucky Jim Mine resumed shipping ore. The next month, grading commenced for Zincton–Whitewater. The existing track was temporarily changed to standard gauge. In November, ore was moving from the mine. The permanent track opened the following month. In November 1913, the eastward advance reached Mile 12 and then Kaslo. During summer 1914, the route was ballasted and a turntable installed at Kaslo. In the fall, a new station building opened at Kaslo.

=== Operation ===
During December 1913 to March 1914, service westward terminated at Mile 12. In July 1914, a free Kaslo–Nakusp passenger excursion ran. The schedule settled into three times weekly. The final weekly passenger train travelled northeast of Rosebery in 1933. Damage from the 1955 floods on Carpenter Creek ended all traffic east of Denver Canyon.

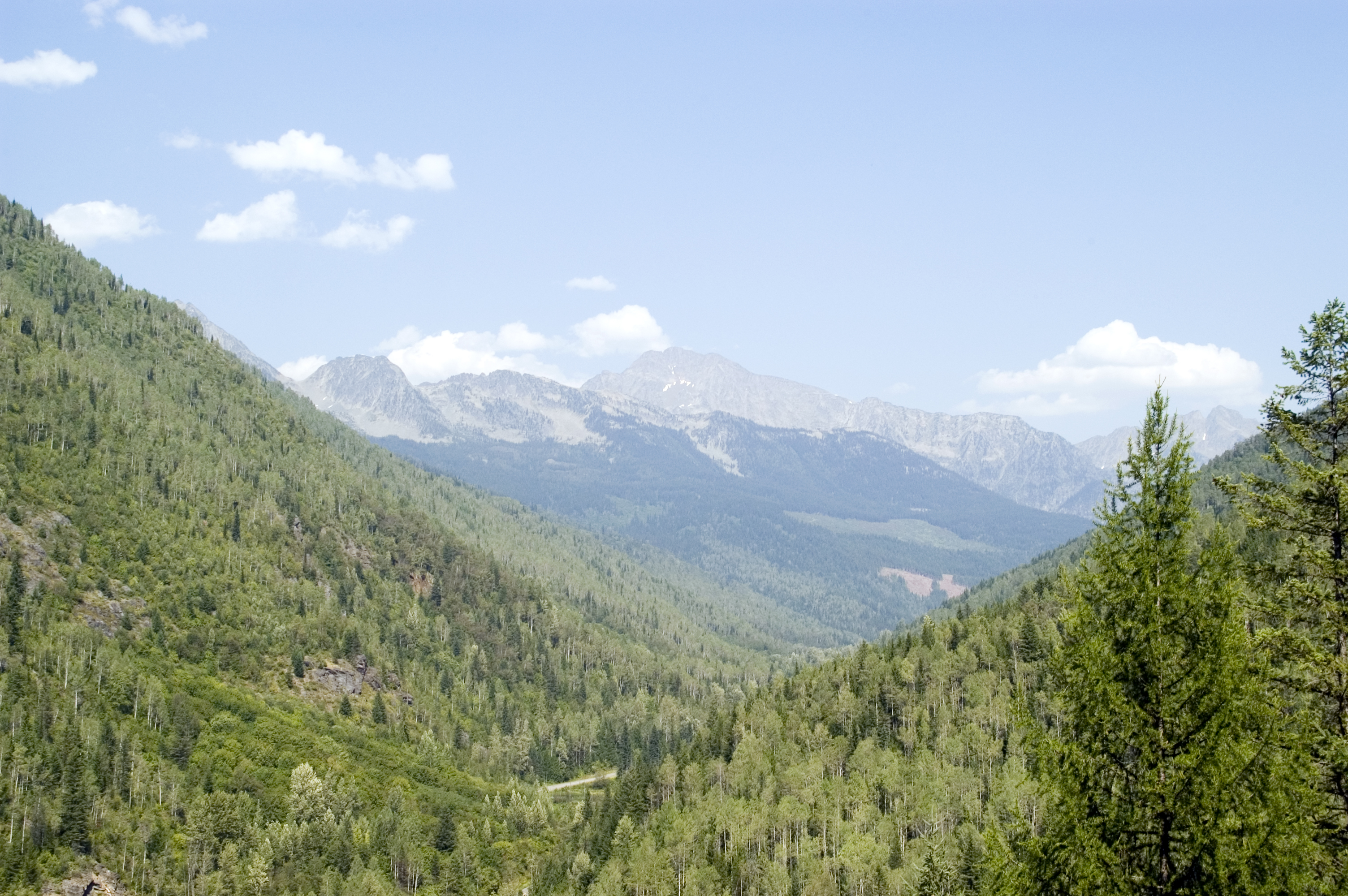
View from K&S right-of-way, 2006

== Route ==
The original route climbed steeply northwestward at 3.25 per cent from Kaslo to the first bench, followed by a steady climb to the pass at Bear Lake, the summit. The remainder stayed near level, negotiated Payne Bluff, over 800 feet (244 m) above the Three Forks confluence, and terminated at Sandon. Tight curves were numerous. A spur served the Cody mines farther up the valley above Sandon.

The gradient of the revised route northeastward from Three Forks to Zincton was heavy, reaching 4.8 per cent. Northwestward from Kaslo, 3.4 per cent was the maximum. Three Forks to Sandon was 4.5 per cent southeastward.

Kaslo–Sandon–Cody
	Feature	Stations										
	Mile	Mile	1895	1908	Mile	1914	Mile	1929	Mile	1932	Mile	1935^{a}
Common route		0.0	Kaslo	Kaslo	25.6	Kaslo	0.0	Kaslo	0.0	Kaslo	0.0	Kaslo
Common route					20.1	Zwickey	5.5	Zwicky	5.5	Zwicky	5.4	Zwicky
Common route		5.7	South Fork	South Fork								
Common route					13.5	Adamant	12.1	Keen	12.1	Keen	12.0	Keen
Common route		15.4	Sproule's	Sproule's	10.1	Blaylock	15.5	Blaylock	15.5	Blaylock	15.5	Blaylock
Common route		18.0	Whitewater	Whitewater	7.5	Retallack	18.1	Retallack	18.1	Retallack	17.9	Retallack
Common route		19.9	Bear Lake	Bear Lake	5.7	Glegerich	19.9	Glegerich	19.9	Glegerich	19.8	Glegerich
Common route					4.8	Zincton	20.8	Zincton	20.8	Zincton	20.7	Zincton
Original route		21.0		Lucky Jim								
Original route	21.4	Lucky Jim snowshed										
Original route		22.7	McGuigan	McGuigan								
Original route	23.0	McGuigan Creek bridge										
Original route	24.7	Payne Bluff										
Original route		24.8	Bailey's	Bailey's								
Original route		26.3		Payne Tram								
Original route		26.5	Cody Jctn.	Cody Jctn.								
Original route		27.7		Wood								
Revised route					2.7	Rambler	22.9	Rambler	22.9	Rambler	22.5	Rambler
Revised route					0.0	Parapet	25.6	Parapet	25.6	Parapet	25.5	Parapet
Common destination		28.2	Sandon	Sandon	Change for Sandon		28.9	Sandon	28.9	Sandon		Sandon
Original route (opened Jan 1896)		0.0	Cody Jctn.									
Original route (opened Jan 1896)		3.1	Cody									

^a . No passenger service by this time.

== Maps ==
- "West Kootenay map". geography.ua.edu. 1902.
- "Slocan map". geography.ua.edu. 1917.

== Rail trail ==
The hiking trail to Payne Bluff is accessible from Sandon or Three Forks. The Kaslo River Trailway follows sections of the right-of-way between Kalso and Three Forks.
