= Nakusp and Slocan Railway =

Railway in British Columbia, Canada

The Nakusp and Slocan Railway (N&S) is a historic Canadian railway that operated in the West Kootenay region of southeastern British Columbia. The N&S initially connected Nakusp and Three Forks but soon extended to Sandon.

== Proposal ==
The 1891 discovery of silver in the Slocan Range created a mining boom. A railway to transport ore was crucial for commercial mining. In 1892, the province issued the N&S charter, which the Canadian Pacific Railway (CP) leased the next year. Steamboat connections on Upper Arrow Lake, were northward from Nakusp to a spur from the CP main line at Revelstoke. About this time, the Kaslo and Slocan Railway (K&S), a Great Northern Railway subsidiary, received a competing charter for a route westward from Kaslo.

== Construction ==
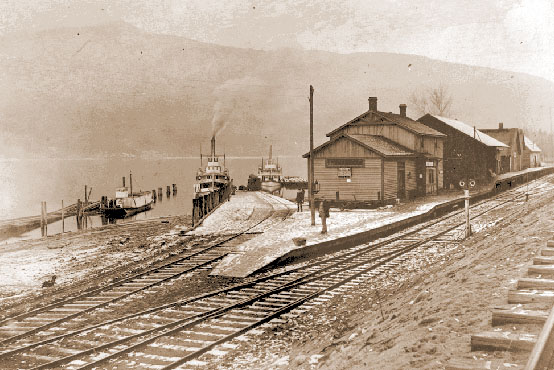
Nakusp station, 1905

In July 1893, D. McGillivray, manager of the Inland Development & Construction Co., the principal contractor, commenced work. Progressing southeastward, the rail head from Nakusp reached Rosebery in August 1894 and Three Forks that October. The 58.6-kilometre (36.4 mi) route attracted a $3,200 per mile grant. Whereas horse packtrains had carried ore from the surrounding mines to New Denver, Three Forks became the new aggregation point.

The advance of the K&S toward Sandon, the vicinity of the most important mines, prompted the N&S to also extend 6.8 kilometres (4.2 mi) to that destination. Arriving in December 1895, regular service began. The festering CP and GN antagonism flared up between the N&S and K&S. That month, K&S crews set loose occupied N&S cars, demolished a bridge, track, a freight shed, and the station, and attacked repair crews. CP subsequently relocated the station and track from disputed land.

== Operation ==
Initially offering lower rates than the N&S, the K&S carried over 80 per cent of Slocan ore, but the proximity of track to the mines determined the carrier in most instances. Agreeing to avoid rate wars, a tenuous truce existed.

From 1897, the Rosebery–Slocan City ferry southward across Slocan Lake linked to the CP Columbia and Kootenay Railway (C&K). Low water and ice on the narrows of the Arrow Lakes made the water route south to Robson (which connected to Nelson and the Trail smelter) unreliable. The combined N&S, ferry, and C&K bypassed this problematic section. To avoid difficult grades on the main line, much eastbound freight was diverted to the route during the early 1900s. Trains were split in half to ascend the steep grade on the Nakusp–Rosebery portion. The route lost importance with the completion of the southern main line in 1915.

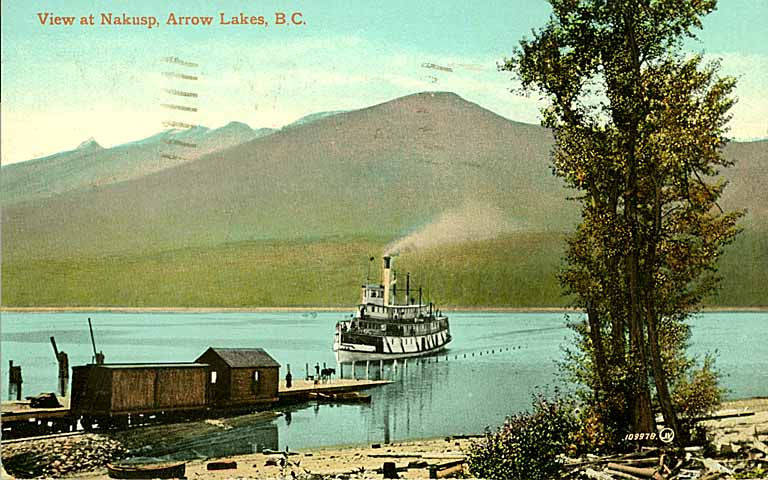
Nakusp railway wharf, 1913

A washout in June 1909, closed the Sandon extension until that October. Furthermore, the steep N&S grades, especially on this section, proved expensive to operate throughout the life of the line.

In 1913, the N&S completed rebuilding the abandoned K&S track, creating a Nakusp–Kaslo through service.

Passenger travel northeast of Rosebery ceased in 1933. Damage from the 1955 floods on Carpenter Creek ended all traffic east of Denver Canyon. Passenger service on the line and lake ferry finished in 1954. The final freight run on these sections was either December 1988 or March 1989. However, the latter service had reduced to twice weekly by the 1960s and once weekly by 1980.

== Route ==
From Nakusp, the line climbed steeply to Summit Lake and descended to Hills on Slocan Lake, encompassing a 2.5 per cent grade. The railway bordered the lake's eastern shore via Rosebery. Bypassing New Denver, a 2.5 per cent climb followed Carpenter Creek terminating at Three Forks, situated over 800 feet (244 m) below Payne Bluff.

The southeastward Three Forks to Sandon extension presented a 4.5 per cent grade.

Sandon–Nakusp
Stations
Mile	1898	Mile	1907	Mile	1914	Mile	1929	Mile	1935	Mile	1943	Mile	1953
0.0	Sandon	0	Sandon	40.7	Sandon	28.9	Sandon						
				37.4	Parapet	25.6	Parapet						
4.2	Three Forks	5	Three Forks	36.4	Three Forks	26.6	Three Forks						
5.4	Alamo Con.	6	Alamo Con.	35.3	Alamo Con.	31.0	Alamo						
8.5	Denver Can.	9	Denver Can.	32.5	Denver Can.	30.5	Denver Can.						
12.3	Roseberry	13	Rosebery	28.4	Rosebery	34.6	Rosebery	34.5	Rosebery	0.0	Rosebery	67.2	Rosebery
17.2	Slocan Lk.	18	Hills	23.5	Hills	39.5	Hills	39.3	Hills	4.9	Hills	72.1	Hills
28.0	Summit	28	Summit	12.7	Summit Lk.	50.3	Summit Lk.	50.8	Summit Lk.	16.3	Summit Lk.	83.5	Summit Lk.
				5.3	Brouse	57.7	Brouse	57.6	Brouse	23.1	Brouse	90.3	Brouse
40.5	Nakusp	41	Nakusp	0.0	Nakusp	63.0	Nakusp	62.9	Nakusp	28.4	Nakusp	95.6	Nakusp

== Rail trails ==
The Nakusp & Slocan Trail comprises Nakusp–Rosebery. North of Summit Lake is well maintained, but south is more rudimentary. The Rosebery to Three Forks Regional Trail (Galena Trail) covers the named section. A designated non-motorized greenway, the latter is well managed.
