= Kaslo River =

River in British Columbia, Canada

Coordinates: 49°54′18″N 116°54′3″W

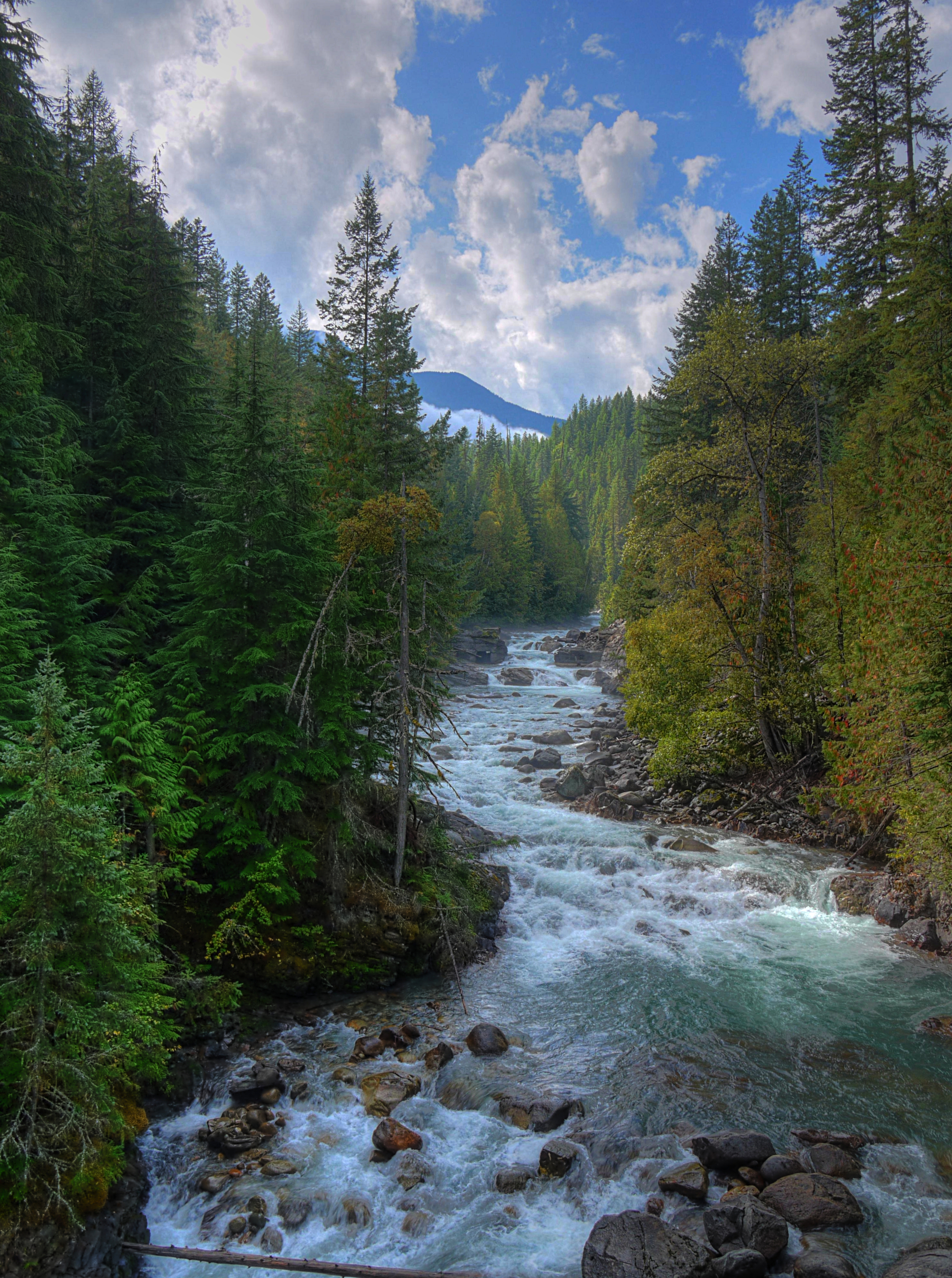
Kaslo River

Kaslo River is a river in the West Kootenay region of southeastern British Columbia, Canada. The village of Kaslo was founded at the river mouth on the western shore of Kootenay Lake. The river valley was mined by European and Chinese miners.

Many theories suggest the origin of the word. Although one popular early legend states the river was named after a placer miner named John Kaslo, Jean Kasleau, or some other spelling, who was part of a Hudson's Bay Company party, no reliable evidence survives to support that such a person existed. Kaslo, or Caslo, likely derives from a First Nations word for which either no interpretation is available, or means the place where blackberries grow. The weakness of this theory is that blackberries never grew in the area, and the idea seemed foreign to First Nations peoples at the time. However, a better translation might be crataegus douglasii, a North American species of hawthorn known commonly as black hawthorn.
