= Rosebery, British Columbia =

Rosebery
- Location of Rosebery in British Columbia
- Coordinates: 50°02′00″N 117°24′40″W
- Country: Canada
- Province: British Columbia
- Region: Slocan Valley, West Kootenay
- Regional district: Central Kootenay
- Area codes: 250, 778, 236, & 672
- Highways: Highway 6

Rosebery is an unincorporated community about 6 kilometres (4 mi) north of New Denver in the West Kootenay region of southeastern British Columbia. The former steamboat landing and ferry terminal is at the mouth of Wilson Creek on the eastern shore of Slocan Lake. The locality, on BC Highway 6, is about 106 kilometres (66 mi) by road north of Castlegar and 144 kilometres (89 mi) by road and ferry south of Revelstoke.

== Name origin ==
Wilson Creek, the former name, came from the creek flowing through the hamlet. The naming honoured either John Wilson, a resident until about 1902, or Arthur M. Wilson, the Slocan's first justice of the peace, who staked land at the creek in 1891, and left in the late 1890s. The Slocan Trading and Navigation Co. (ST&N) steamboat Wm. Hunter, launched at New Denver in November 1892, would have served the location on its regular trips from New Denver to the head and foot of the lake. With the coming railway, a townsite was surveyed and renamed Rosebery, in honor of the prime minister of Great Britain, Lord Rosebery. He may have been a Canadian Pacific Railway (CP) director. From the beginning, the place name was often misspelled Roseberry.

== Rail/ferry expansion ==
The southeastward advance of the Nakusp & Slocan Railway (N&S) rail head from Nakusp reached Rosebery in August 1894, and the terminus at Three Forks that November. CP, the N&S owner, built a medium-sized station, section house, freight shed, sidings, and wharf at Rosebery, which was the transfer terminal for travel to other points on the lake. The ST&N, which had primarily served New Denver to Silverton and Bonanza City, substituted Rosebery/Wilson Creek for the latter from the beginning of 1895. The transshipment of ore, even from the foot of the lake, was initially northward via Rosebery to the CP main line.

The Columbia and Kootenay Steam Navigation Company (C&KSN) acquired ST&N, and CP bought C&KSN in February 1897, which included the small Rosebery shipyard. During the earlier years, ongoing improvements were made to the Rosebery wharf infrastructure, ultimately allowing a seamless rolling of freight cars onto/off a rail barge. From 1897, the Rosebery–Slocan City ferry linked to the CP Columbia and Kootenay Railway (C&K). In 1898, CP installed a turntable at Rosebery.

CP acquired the abandoned Kaslo and Slocan Railway, rebuilt the infrastructure to standard gauge, and opened the link to Kaslo in 1913.

== Early rail/ferry accidents ==
1897: A brakeman, who fell between cars, sustained a crushed leg.

1898: Two loaded freight cars plunged into the lake during unloading from a barge.

1899: On departing, a deckhand fell from the barge and drowned in the frigid waters.

== Community ==
In 1897, an English syndicate bought the townsite. The population of 85 included 21 children. However, being a strategic rail/ferry transport link alone was insufficient to elevate Rosebery to the likes of district communities thriving during the mining boom. The opening and closure of the post office, and periods of losing a hotel and store, reflected the uncertainty. Announcements of projects to build a concentrator came to naught. When one was finally built, it operated less than a year, with limited temporary use years later.

Nowadays, Rosebery is a largely agricultural, recreation-retirement, and resource community.

== Rail/ferry contraction ==
The station was 6.4 kilometres (4.0 mi) southwest of Denver Canyon, and 7.7 kilometres (4.8 mi) southeast of Hills. A wye replaced the turntable. The final passenger train northeast of Roseberry ran in 1933. Damage from the 1955 floods on Carpenter Creek ended all traffic east of Denver Canyon. The final passenger service on the remainder of the line and by ferry across the lake ended in 1954. The final freight run on these sections was either December 1988 or March 1989. However, by the 1960s, the latter service had reduced to twice weekly, and once weekly by 1980.

Train Timetables (Regular stop or Flag stop)
Year	1898	1907	1918	1929	1932	1935	1939	1943	1948	1953	1954
Ref.											
Type	Regular	Regular	Regular	Regular	Regular	Regular	Regular	Regular	Regular	Regular	None

== Japanese internment ==
Rosebery was one of the smaller West Kootenay internment camps housing Japanese Canadians removed from the BC coast during World War II. Holding 357 individuals, the center had the smallest number of children attending school, about 100.

== See also ==
- "1899 Kootenay map". www.library.ubc.ca. p. 1.
