= Sandon, British Columbia =

Sandon
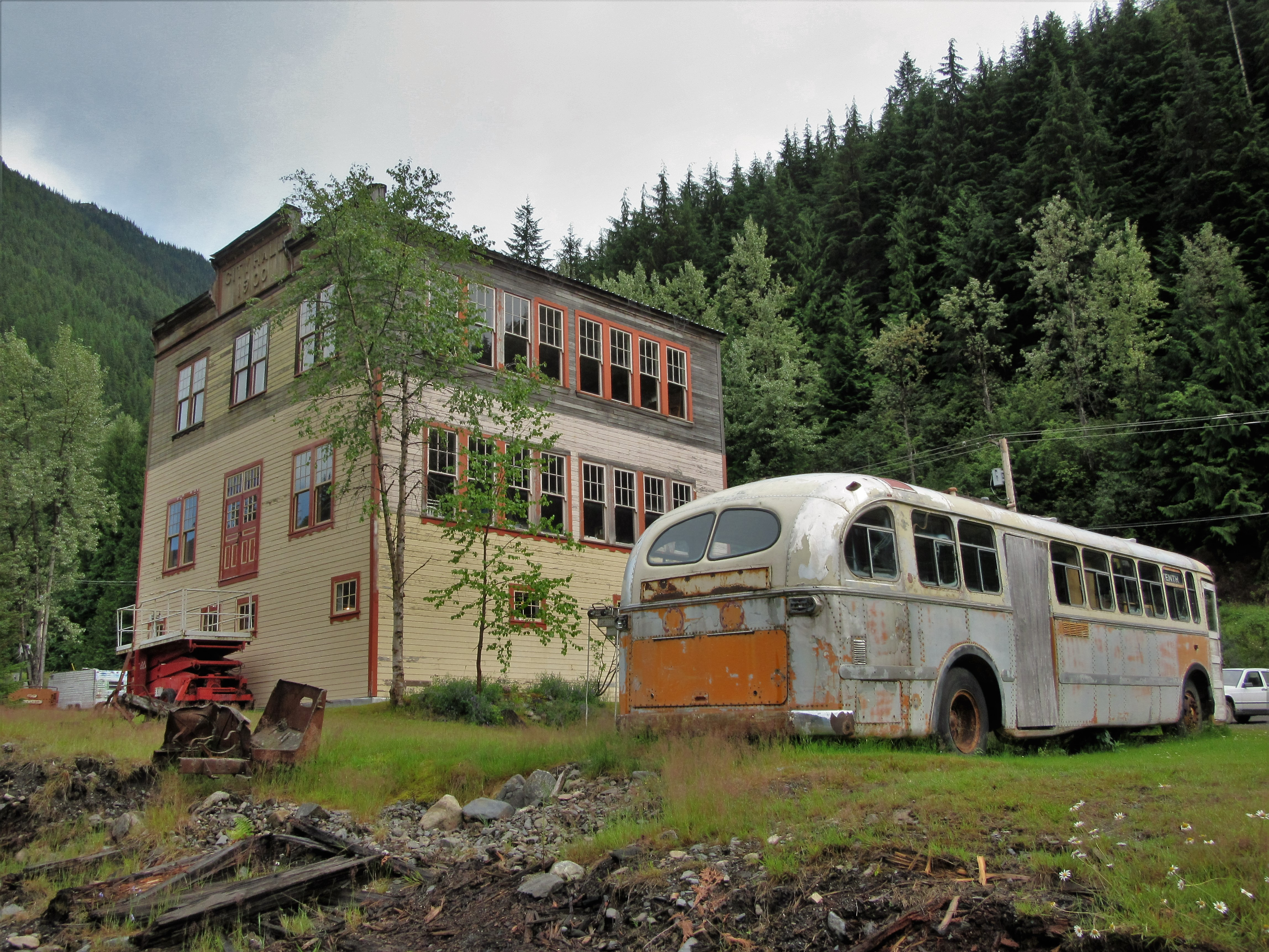
- Trolleybus beside a building in Sandon

- Location within British Columbia
- Coordinates: 49°58′32″N 117°13′38″W
- Country: Canada
- Province: British Columbia
- Region: Slocan Valley, West Kootenay
- Regional district: Central Kootenay
- Incorporated: January 1, 1898
- Elevation: 1,060 m (3,480 ft)
- Area codes: 250, 778, 236, & 672

Sandon is in the foothills of the Selkirk Mountains in the West Kootenay region of southeastern British Columbia. The near ghost town lies off BC Highway 31A, and is at the confluence of Sandon Creek into Carpenter Creek. By road, the place is about 14 kilometres (9 mi) east of New Denver and 43 kilometres (27 mi) west of Kaslo.

== Name origin ==
The name derives from Sandon Creek, which acknowledges John Sandon. Among the prospectors who inundated the Slocan Valley in the fall of 1891, Sandon staked several claims, including the Slocan Star, registered as being on Sandon Creek. With partner Bruce White, he preempted land at the creek mouth. He sold his interest in the Slocan Star to White that December for $500, a property that would become extremely valuable. To help meet the demand from the surrounding mining camps, John Sandon's vegetable farm included seven acres in potatoes.

In February 1893, Kenneth McLeod and Sandon were believed drowned in Kootenay Lake, though no bodies were recovered. Joseph Hetherington, who worked on Sandon's farm, produced a will. The document left the whole estate to Hetherington, despite Sandon having relatives in California, and the signature being a cross apparently inscribed by a fully literate man. These obstacles did not prevent Hetherington from obtaining probate of the contested will and inheriting the land.

John (Johnny) Morgan Harris was a partner in the Ruecau galena claim, shortened to Rico or Reco. A single July 1892 newspaper report calls the townsite Reco. A May 1893 liquor licence application identifies a hotel as being at Sanden (sic).

== Early settlement ==
Robert E. Lemon, a prominent merchant who owned the adjacent Blue Jay claim, laid out the Sandon townsite in July 1893. Lemon Creek would later link to this individual. In December 1895, Harris laid out an addition extending the southern perimeter onto his Loudon claim. East Sandon (1896 and 1900), Sunnyside (1898), and West Sandon (1900) were further additions. Harris owned hotels, office buildings, the power plant, waterworks, and other real estate throughout what was known as the Monte Carlo of North America. The town included many hotels, three breweries, and a red-light district.

Sandon incorporated as a city on January 1, 1898.

Under Harris's oversight during the mining boom of the 1890s, Sandon enjoyed all the amenities and services common to established Canadian centres. Facilities included a large curling arena, hockey rink, two ski hills and venues for lacrosse, soccer, baseball, lawn bowling, cricket and tennis. Indoor facilities included a bowling alley, billiard halls, and a gymnasium. Sandon was the first fully electrified town in BC. The Silversmith Powerhouse (1897) was the second hydroelectricity plant in Western Canada - after Nelson - and is the oldest continuous producer in Western Canada, with the current equipment - originally a 1905 installation in a City of Vernon plant, and installed at Sandon in 1916. Unfortunately, the amount BC Hydro pays for power delivered to the grid barely covers costs.

== Railways ==
Two different railways raced to reach the town first. The Kaslo & Slocan Railway, owned by the Great Northern Railway, connected Sandon with Kaslo, on Kootenay Lake. The Nakusp & Slocan Railway, owned by the Canadian Pacific Railway, connected with Nakusp on the Upper Arrow Lake, and the Slocan Lake ferry at Rosebery. On the railway arrivals in 1895, the rivalry escalated into sabotage. The final passenger train ran in 1933. Damage from the 1955 floods on Carpenter Creek ended all rail traffic to Sandon.

== Mining ==
Following the 1891 discovery of silver by Eli Carpenter and Jack Seaton, thousands of prospectors sought the rich deposits of silver-lead ore. Sandon silver mines were collectively the richest in the province during 1892–1900. After an ebb, World War I was the most productive mining period. The early 1950s, during the Korean War, brought a temporary peak in silver prices, and a rejuvenation of mining, before ending in 1953. The Silvana Mine later operated, but became dormant in 1993. Klondike Silver Corp. have acquired the undersurface mine, but it is unclear whether any genuine exploration is being conducted.

== Decline ==
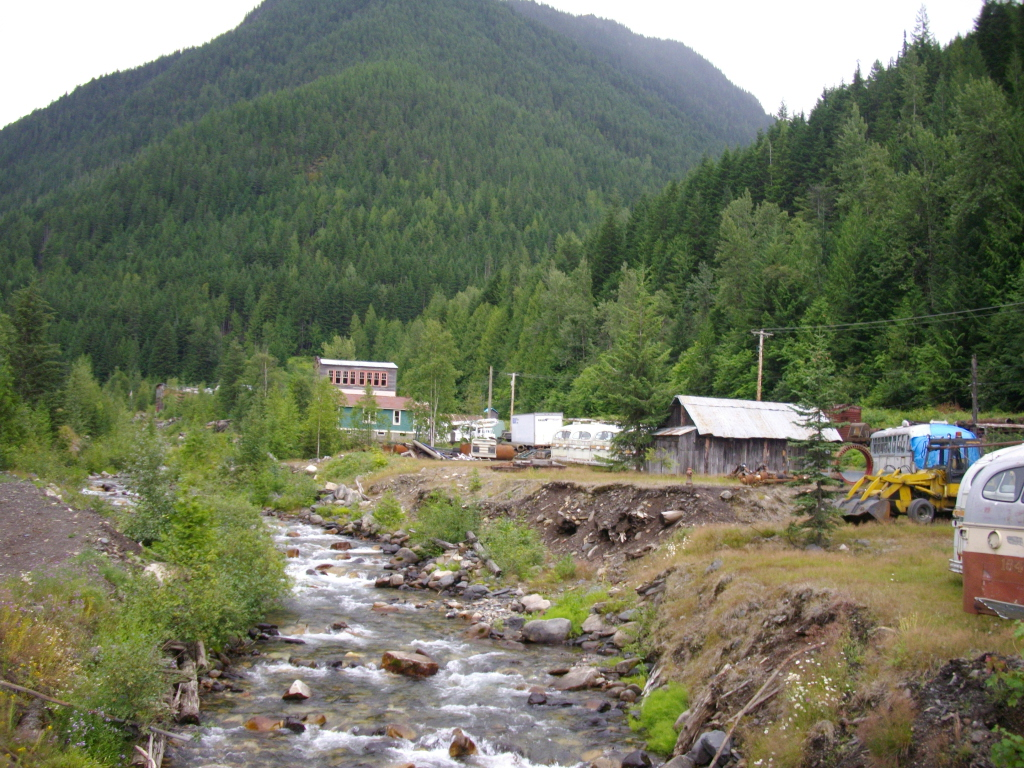
Sandon from Carpenter Creek

The May 1900 fire, which started behind Spencer's Opera House, destroyed most of the downtown core. The rebuilt structures were less grandiose, but fortune returned for brief periods of mining prosperity. In 1907, an avalanche caused extensive damage. In 1920, the city entered receivership and dissolved its incorporation. Without a municipal tax base, facilities deteriorated. After 1953, large scale mining never returned. Still a resident, a financially broken Harris died that year.

When the creek blocked following torrential rain in June 1955, the overflow destroyed most remaining structures. Vandals and treasure hunters, who had swooped in earlier, next scavenged what remained, before targeting the nearby ghost towns.

Local historian Bill Barlee believes the flood deposited 10,000 coins along the bed of Carpenter Creek, because the main street of Sandon was built over the creek, and any items under the boardwalk would have washed into it.

== Japanese internment ==
Sandon was one of the West Kootenay internment camps housing Japanese Canadians removed from the BC coast during World War II. The 953 internees, who co-existed peacefully with the then 50 residents, both occupied and rehabilitated the dilapidated largely empty buildings. However, the harsh winters prompted an early camp closure and relocation to New Denver.

== Present community ==
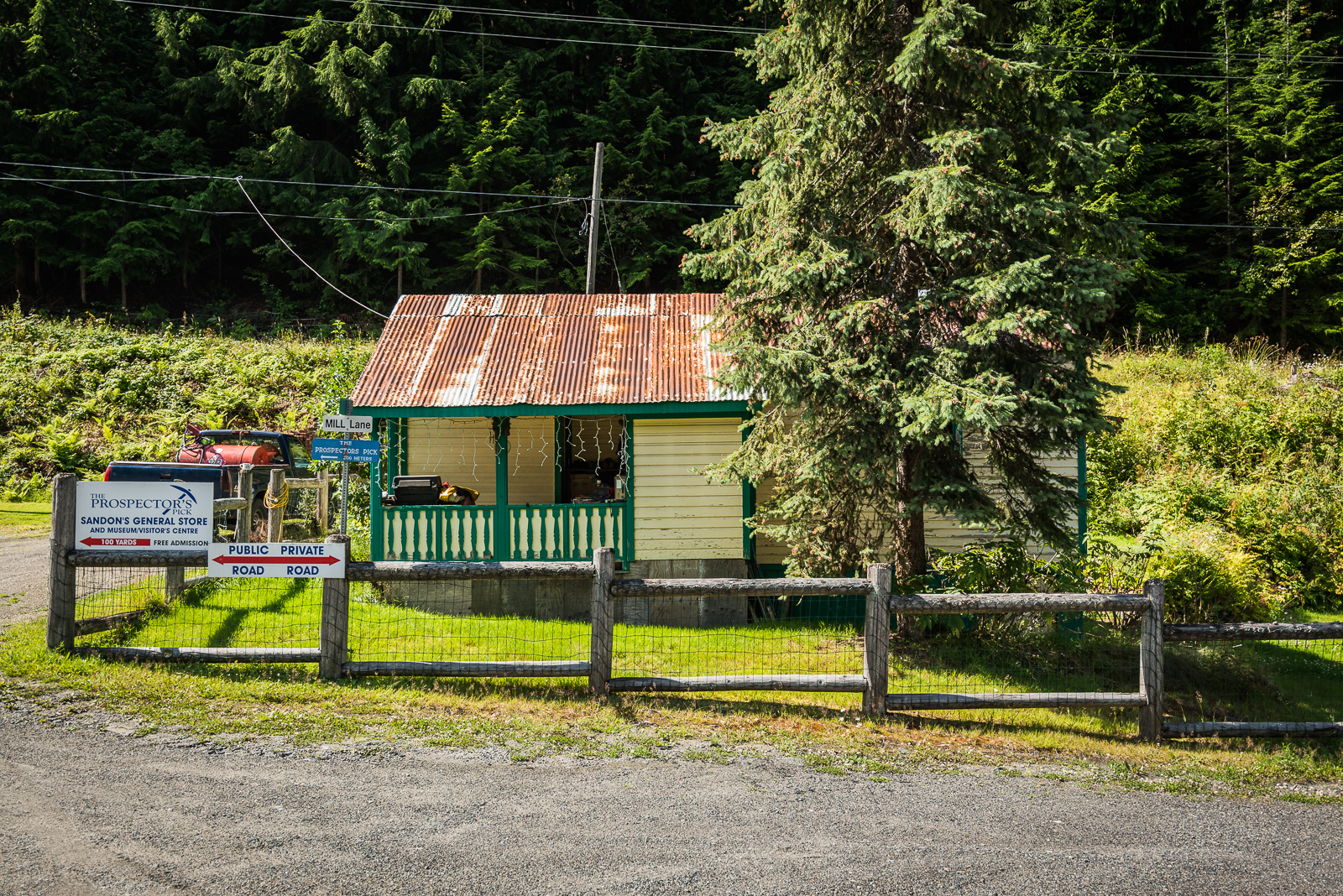
Site entry, Sandon, 2016

The few remaining permanent citizens and newcomers to Sandon have fought to prevent total loss of the remnants. Hal Wright, who arrived in the 1970s, assumed the role of unofficial caretaker. Since that time, he has bought much of the vacant land from the government, and worked with volunteers to preserve the remaining pioneer buildings, such as the city hall, the Silversmith Powerhouse and several original residences. The restored Slocan Mercantile General Store has a heritage designation. The site draws over 60,000 visitors a year.

One of the biggest tourist attractions is about 20 heritage Brill trolleybuses shipped from Vancouver in the early 2000s. The fleet includes some decommissioned by Calgary Transit in 1975 and sold to BC Transit, which cannibalized them for parts.

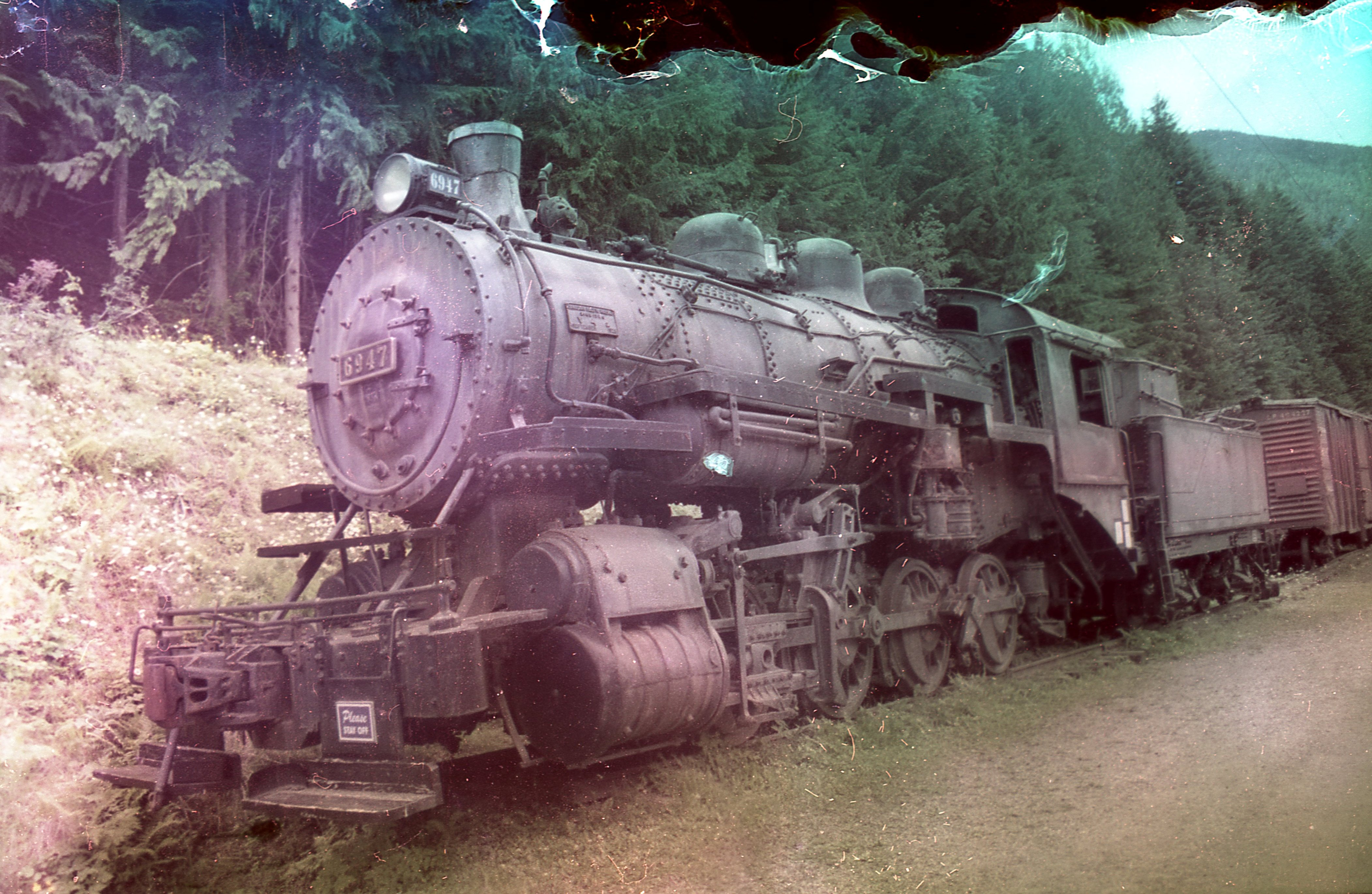
Canadian Pacific No. 6947 on display in Sandon, B.C.

The site also displays Canadian Pacific No. 6947, a 1908 0-8-0 steam locomotive. It was built as No. 1737 of the 2-8-0 M4h class by the Montreal Locomotive Works for mainline duties, but was renumbered in January 1913 to No. 3537 and assigned to branchline work in the Kootenay subdivision. In September 1928, it was rebuilt as a V4a class switcher locomotive and numbered No. 6947. After being retired by the Canadian Pacific Railway in February 1959, it was sold to the Manitoba and Saskatchewan Coal Company where it hauled coal in the Prairies. No. 6947 was finally withdrawn from service in 1967 and stored until 1970, when it was purchased by the Alberta Pioneer Railway Association, operators of the Alberta Railway Museum, and relocated to Edmonton where it was put on display. It was sold once more to the Municipality of Cypress in 1998, but was soon acquired by the Wrightway Charter Company of Sandon. No. 6947, nicknamed the Ghost Train, is now part of a freight train exhibit at the site, consisting of the locomotive, one tank car, two wooden boxcars, and two flatcars.

Plans to create a viable heritage site have stalled owing to a lack of provincial funding. In the interim, Sandon's preservation rests on volunteers and visitor donations. In 2018, the community hosted the Valley of the Ghosts Music Festival.

== Television ==
Sandon was featured on the historical television series Gold Trails and Ghost Towns on Season 1, Episode 1.

== Notable Sandonites ==
Sandon was the birthplace of hockey Hall of Fame member Cecil "Tiny" Thompson.

== See also ==
- Silver rush
