= Carpenter Creek (British Columbia) =

Watercourse in British Columbia, Canada

Coordinates: 49.9761°N 117.2285°W

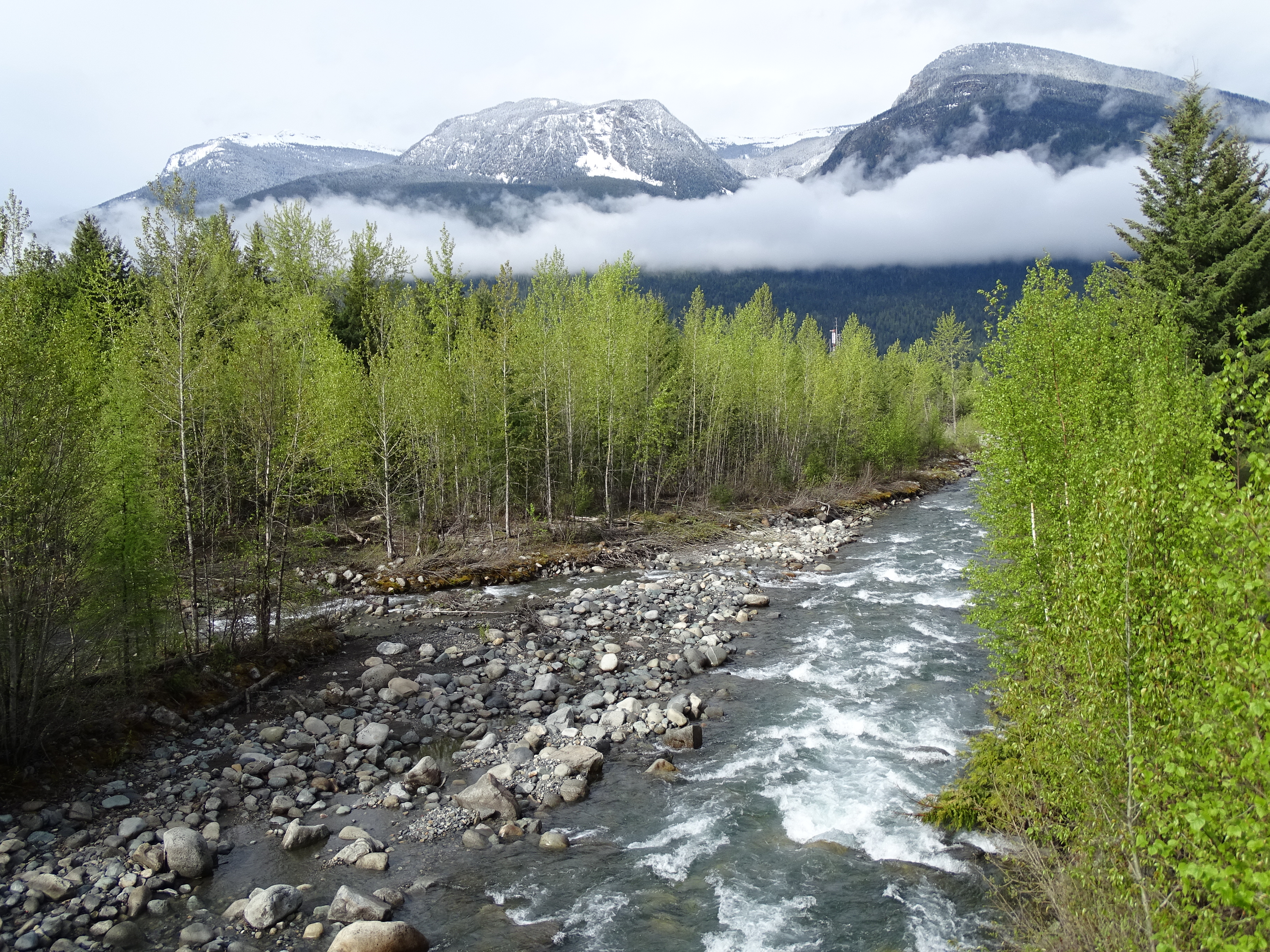
Carpenter Creek near New Denver

Carpenter Creek is a creek in the West Kootenay region of British Columbia. Carpenter creek flows out of the Selkirk Mountains, through the historic town of Sandon and into Slocan Lake at New Denver.

The town of Sandon's main street was built over Carpenter Creek. In 1955 the creek flooded. British Columbia historian Bill Barlee believes coins were washed into the creek from under the boardwalk during the flood. The boardwalk is made of boards with cracks between them. Coins could fall between the cracks and lay beneath the boards of the boardwalk. Bill states the coins were carried out into Carpenter Creek during the flood. It is speculated that a possible 10,000 coins lie in Carpenter Creek.
