= New Denver =

- Village
- The Corporation of the Village of New Denver
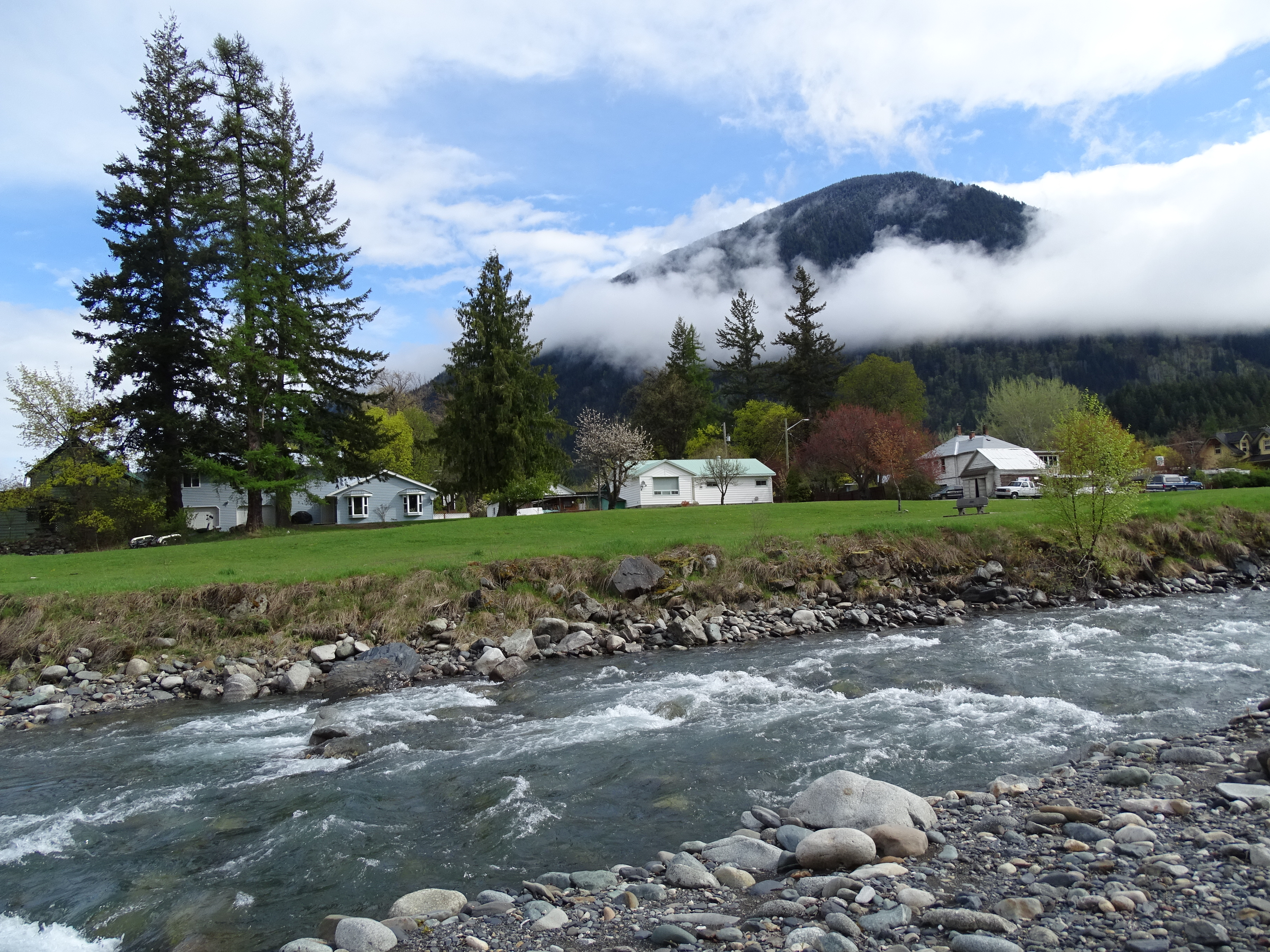

- Location of New Denver in British Columbia
- Coordinates: 49°59′29″N 117°22′19″W
- Country: Canada
- Province: British Columbia
- Region: Slocan Valley, West Kootenay
- Regional district: Central Kootenay
- Founded: 1892
- Incorporated: 1929

Government
  - Governing body: New Denver Village Council
  - Mayor: Leonard Casley

Area
  - Total: 0.87 km^{2} (0.34 sq mi)
- Elevation: 560 m (1,840 ft)

Population (2016)
  - Total: 473
  - Density: 543.7/km^{2} (1,408/sq mi)
- Time zone: UTC−07:00 (PT)
- Area codes: 250, 778, 236, & 672
- Highways: Highway 6 Highway 31A
- Waterways: Slocan Lake
- Website: newdenver.ca

New Denver is a village in the Central Kootenay region of British Columbia, Canada at the mouth of Carpenter Creek, on the east shore of Slocan Lake, in the West Kootenay region of southeastern British Columbia. The village is 47 kilometres (29 mi) west of Kaslo on Highway 31A, and 47 kilometres (29 mi) southeast of Nakusp and 32 kilometres (20 mi) northeast of Slocan on Highway 6.

== Name origin ==
In 1892, the town was mostly called Slocan City or Slocan for about a month, Eldorado City or Eldorado for about seven months, and New Denver since. However, these names were used interchangeably for months. Furthermore, the place may have been known as Carpenter Creek townsite after its founding in 1891.

Appearing about the same time as the Slocan community at the foot of the lake, it is unclear why the latter prevailed in keeping the name. Until the government survey in mid 1892, the place was a squatters camp for miners. Named for El Dorado, the legendary city of gold, the surrounding mines were hoped to bring comparable prosperity. On discovering the mines were silver deposits, the name changed to reflect the famed silver mines of Denver, Colorado.

== History ==
New Denver was an early service center for mines and the nearby mining towns. It could be reached by boat, and a stagecoach ran every two days to Nakusp, and every four days to Nelson. In 1895, Denver Canyon became a stop on the former Nakusp and Slocan Railway. The settlement was incorporated as a village in 1929. After the decline in mining, forestry became the economic base, and tourism in more recent times.

=== Japanese internment during World War II ===
One of nine West Kootenay internment centres for Japanese Canadians during World War II (following removal from the BC Coast), by 1942 the camp held 1,505 Japanese Canadians, who built 275 shacks in a fruit grove known as the "Orchard." Other internment centres in the Slocan region were nearby at Slocan City, Lemon Creek, Rosebery, Kaslo and Sandon.

New Denver's Nikkei Internment Memorial Centre is dedicated to the history of the 27,000 interned Japanese Canadians, and is a National Historic Site.

=== Doukhobor residential school ===
For decades Freedomites refused to send their Doukhobor children to school. After multiple warnings, the government forcibly removed such children from their families. Operating 1953–1959, about 170 children, aged 7–15, passed through the New Denver facility but attended the public school. Although parents were allowed twice-monthly visits, most chose instead to speak to their children through the wire fence.

=== Zincton resort controversy ===
In May 2020, New Denver resident David Harley, owner of Valhalla Pure Outfitters, proposed building a 55-acre "world-class, all-season, backcountry-oriented" resort called Zincton between New Denver and Kaslo. Those promoting Zincton claim the resort will create jobs and do much to remedy economic and social decline in the area. The proposed site is in a critical wildlife corridor connecting Goat Range and Kokanee Provincial Parks and is also prime grizzly bear habitat; opponents fear the resort's negative ecological impact. Of the 3000 emailed comments received by British Columbia's Ministry of Forests, Lands, Natural Resource Operations and Rural Development regarding Zincton, 2300 opposed building the resort.

== Demographics ==
In the 2021 Census of Population conducted by Statistics Canada, New Denver had a population of 487 living in 248 of its 304 total private dwellings, a change of 3% from its 2016 population of 473. With a land area of 0.87 km^{2} (0.34 sq mi), it had a population density of 559.8/km^{2} (1,449.8/sq mi) in 2021.

== Communications ==
The town is notable for its resistance to mobile phones. In a 2008 referendum, many citizens voted against the introduction of cellular telephone service. Despite this, on 20 July 2010, Telus Canada began installation of a cell phone facility in the heart of the village, with many citizens peacefully protesting the installation.

== Climate ==
Climate data for New Denver
Month	Jan	Feb	Mar	Apr	May	Jun	Jul	Aug	Sep	Oct	Nov	Dec	Year
Record high °C (°F)	10.6 (51.1)	14 (57)	21 (70)	27.2 (81.0)	33.5 (92.3)	35.5 (95.9)	38.5 (101.3)	37.2 (99.0)	35.5 (95.9)	24 (75)	18.3 (64.9)	11.5 (52.7)	38.5 (101.3)
Mean daily maximum °C (°F)	0.5 (32.9)	2.9 (37.2)	8.1 (46.6)	13.9 (57.0)	18.9 (66.0)	22.4 (72.3)	26.1 (79.0)	25.9 (78.6)	19.8 (67.6)	11.5 (52.7)	4.3 (39.7)	0.2 (32.4)	12.9 (55.2)
Daily mean °C (°F)	−1.7 (28.9)	−0.3 (31.5)	3.6 (38.5)	8 (46)	12.5 (54.5)	16.1 (61.0)	19.1 (66.4)	18.9 (66.0)	13.9 (57.0)	7.5 (45.5)	2 (36)	−1.9 (28.6)	8.1 (46.6)
Mean daily minimum °C (°F)	−4 (25)	−3.5 (25.7)	−1.1 (30.0)	2 (36)	6 (43)	9.6 (49.3)	12 (54)	11.8 (53.2)	7.8 (46.0)	3.5 (38.3)	−0.4 (31.3)	−4 (25)	3.3 (37.9)
Record low °C (°F)	−23.5 (−10.3)	−21 (−6)	−15.6 (3.9)	−7.2 (19.0)	−2 (28)	2.2 (36.0)	1.1 (34.0)	1.7 (35.1)	−1.5 (29.3)	−11 (12)	−23.5 (−10.3)	−28.9 (−20.0)	−28.9 (−20.0)
Average precipitation mm (inches)	100.8 (3.97)	57.1 (2.25)	62.7 (2.47)	61.6 (2.43)	66.1 (2.60)	84.2 (3.31)	60.8 (2.39)	54.9 (2.16)	55 (2.2)	70.1 (2.76)	105.2 (4.14)	94.2 (3.71)	872.6 (34.35)
Average rainfall mm (inches)	43.1 (1.70)	36.8 (1.45)	54.8 (2.16)	60.8 (2.39)	66 (2.6)	84.2 (3.31)	60.8 (2.39)	54.9 (2.16)	55 (2.2)	69.8 (2.75)	86.1 (3.39)	39 (1.5)	711.5 (28.01)
Average snowfall cm (inches)	57.6 (22.7)	20.3 (8.0)	7.9 (3.1)	0.7 (0.3)	0.1 (0.0)	0 (0)	0 (0)	0 (0)	0 (0)	0.3 (0.1)	19.1 (7.5)	55.2 (21.7)	161.1 (63.4)

== Flora and fauna ==
2019 saw a drastic increase in New Denver's native roof rat population. The Norwegian rat was introduced to the area the same year and is thought to have arrived by transport truck from other regions. Council members blamed the infestation on local gardening and composting practices.

== Notable people ==
- Aubrey Nealon (born 1971), film and television director, producer and writer
- David Suzuki, Canadian geneticist, broadcaster and author, was among those interned here during the Second World War.
