= Gold Hill, British Columbia =

Gold Hill
- Location of Gold Hill in British Columbia
- Coordinates: 50°22′59″N 117°05′04″W
- Country: Canada
- Province: British Columbia
- Region: West Kootenay
- Regional district: Central Kootenay
- Area codes: 250, 778, 236, & 672
- Highway: Highway 31

Gold Hill or Goldhill is a ghost town in the West Kootenay region of southeastern British Columbia. The former mining community is on the northeast side of the Lardeau River. The locality, on BC Highway 31, is about 32 kilometres (20 mi) northwest of Lardeau (head of Kootenay Lake) and 21 kilometres (13 mi) southeast of Gerrard.

== Name origin ==
In the 1890s, the trail from Lardeau to Trout Lake joined the Lardeau River at Cascade Creek, just upstream from the future Gold Hill.

Second Crossing was the original name, being the second place the railway crossed the river. In 1903, Edward Mobbs established a town during the goldrush, which he called Uto, but then renamed as Goldhill within days.

Some early newspaper reports did not clearly differentiate between the crossing and Bosworth, which might suggest the commercial enterprises were found somewhere in between.

== Ferry and road bridges ==
During the railway construction, grading northwestward had reached Duncan City (Howser) by 1899, but clearing extended well beyond. At the second crossing, about 13 kilometres (8 mi) away, a ferry operated across the river.

When the reaction ferry barge was launched for the season in June 1901, the wild current took up the slack in the cable, creating a sudden jerk. The cable drum snapped off and two of the seven railway engineers on board were propelled overboard. Although both were rescued, the barge was destroyed on rocks downstream.

Assumedly, the ferry operated at least until the permanent rail bridge opened in late 1902. A road or footbridge opened at least within a few years.

In 1964–65, the highway bridge underwent extensive repairs. It is unclear whether this was the former rail bridge and current highway bridge.

== Railway ==
The narrowed valley at this point provided a good location for a bridge. The northwestward advance of the Arrowhead and Kootenay Railway rail head reached Second Crossing in November 1901. That month, a temporary bridge was completed, to be replaced by a truss bridge in the spring. That December, five construction crew sustained minor injuries when their handcar collided with a stationary flatcar just south of the crossing. After a break over the winter, tracklaying on this Canadian Pacific Railway (CP) subsidiary resumed the following May and was completed to the foot of Trout Lake in early June. During 1904, Gold Hill may also have been an unofficial flag stop.

In 1942, CP abandoned the line and the rail bed was adapted to become a public highway.

Train Timetables (Regular stop or Flag stop)
	Mile	1903	1905	1909	1912	1916	1919	c.1922	1929	1932	1935
Gerrard	33.1	Regular	Regular	Regular	Regular	Regular	Regular	Regular	Regular	Regular	
MacInnes	23.7	Regular	Regular	Both	Both						
Poplar	23.1			Regular	Regular	Flag	Both	Flag	Flag	Flag	
Gold Hill	19.8				Flag	Flag	Both	Flag	Flag	Flag	
Bosworth	16.3	Regular	Regular	Regular	Regular	Flag	Both	Flag	Flag	Flag	
Howser	12.2	Regular	Flag		Flag	Flag	Both	Flag	Flag	Flag	
La Blanche	8.0	Regular	Regular	Regular	Regular						
Marble Head	8.0					Flag	Both	Flag	Flag	Flag	

== Community ==
Both Edward Mobbs and Hugh McDonald applied for liquor licences in 1901, but only Joseph Howson, who ran the Ottawa House hotel, was granted one. Months later, he transferred the licence to McDonald.

By summer 1903, a new mining camp held a large number of prospectors. At the time, the wagon road from Poplar Creek was upgraded.

Although the Ulvin Bros applied for a liquor licence that November, their Miners' Hotel may well have opened months later. Casey and Murphy opened the Hotel Bosworth in the new year, but the location could have been closer to Bosworth. In March 1904, Hawthorne Bros completed their store. During the brief 1904–1906 post office existence, Charles Hawthorne was postmaster. By summer 1904, the Hotel Bosworth had become a Casey and Mobbs partnership, and a large number of prospectors worked in the surrounding hills.

After a winter closure, the Ulvin hotel reopened in spring 1905. The gold boom over, the town quickly faded.

During 1913–1915 and 1922, gold dredging operations took place on the river.

The train made a one-hour meal stop at the Miners' Hotel into the 1920s. Emma Rear, step-daughter of John Ulvin, later operated the hotel. One account suggests closure in the 1940s and the later dismantling and removal of the building to Gerrard. Another account suggests the hotel was still operating into the 1950s.

All the earlier buildings have since disappeared and only a few scattered later residences remain.

== Agriculture ==
In 1912, land was promoted for developing orchards.

== Map ==
- "Lardeau map". geography.ua.edu. 1929.
