= Mount Wilkie =

Mountain in British Columbia, Canada

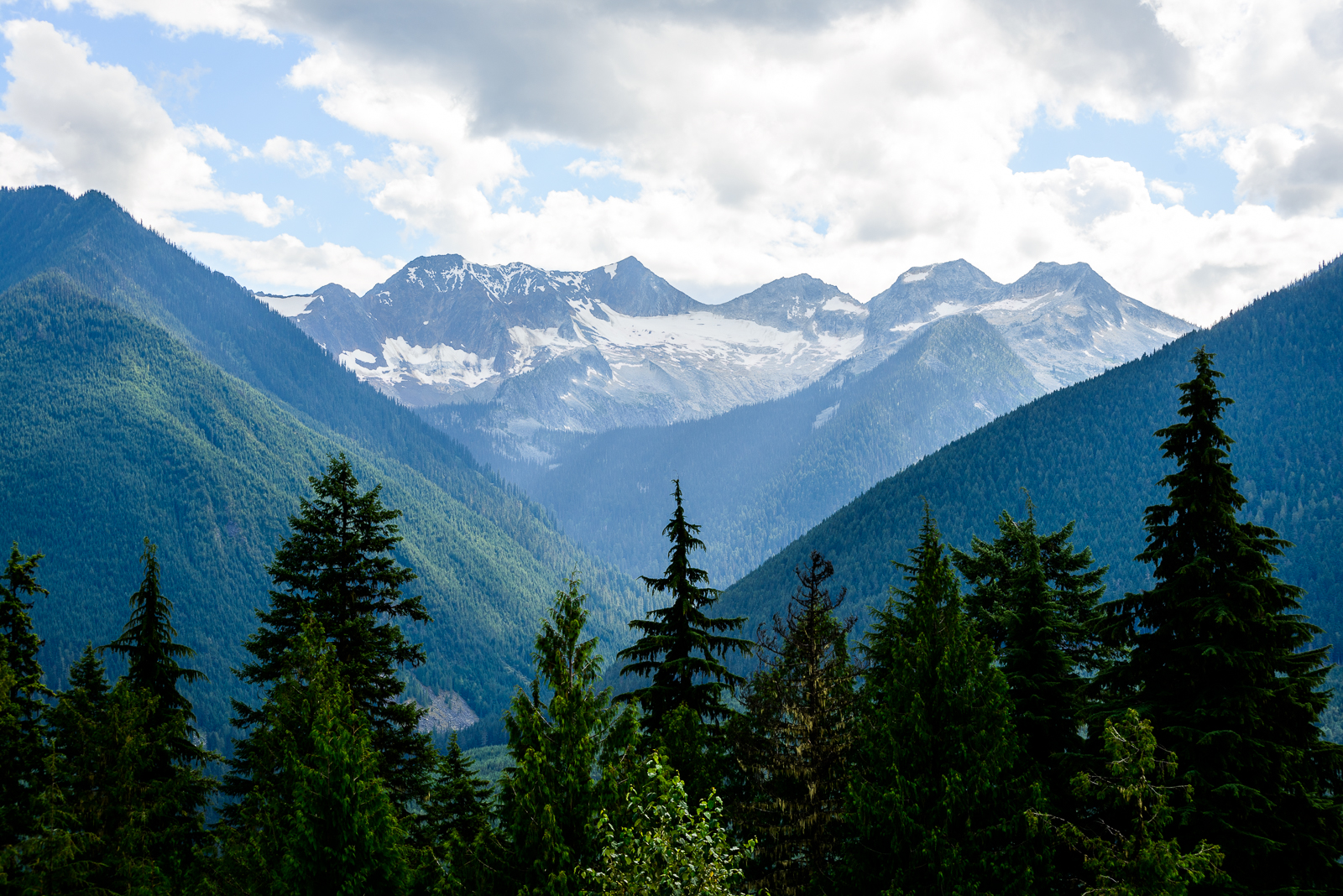
- Northeast aspect

Highest point
- Elevation: 2,699 m (8,855 ft)
- Prominence: 797 m (2,615 ft)
- Parent peak: Mount Cooper
- Isolation: 11.52 km (7.16 mi)
- Listing: Mountains of British Columbia
- Coordinates: 50°29′01″N 117°25′43″W

Naming
- Etymology: Octavius Bentley Neves Wilkie

Geography
- Location within British Columbia Location within Canada
- Interactive map of Mount Wilkie
- Country: Canada
- Province: British Columbia
- District: Kootenay Land District
- Protected area: Goat Range Provincial Park
- Parent range: Selkirk Mountains; Lardeau Range
- Topo map: NTS 82K6 Poplar Creek

Mount Wilkie is a 2,699-metre (8,855-foot) summit in British Columbia, Canada.

== Description ==
Mount Wilkie is the highest point of the Lardeau Range which is a subrange of the Selkirk Mountains. The true summit (2,699 m) lies less than 800 metres west of the 2,630-metre summit marked as Mount Wilkie on topographic maps. The mountain is located eight kilometres (5.0 mi) southeast of Trout Lake on the northern boundary of Goat Range Provincial Park. Precipitation runoff and glacial meltwater from this mountain's slopes drains to Trout Lake, thence Lardeau River. Mount Wilkie is more notable for its steep rise above local terrain than for its absolute elevation as topographic relief is significant with the summit rising 1,985 metres (6,512 ft) above Trout Lake in less than eight kilometres (5.0 mi) and 1,355 metres (4,445 ft) above Mobbs Creek in three kilometres (1.9 mi).

== History ==
The mountain's name honors surveyor Octavius Bentley Neves Wilkie (1872–1942), who worked at Trout Lake for many years. He worked on the Alaska Boundary Survey, surveyed the boundary country and in the Kootenays. He was also an original member of the Alpine Club of Canada. The toponym was officially adopted March 31, 1924, by the Geographical Names Board of Canada.

== Climate ==
Based on the Köppen climate classification, Mount Wilkie is located in a Subarctic climate zone of western North America. Winter temperatures can drop below −20 °C with wind chill factors below −30 °C. This climate supports an unnamed glacier on the north slope of the peak. The months of July through September offer the most favorable weather for climbing Mount Wilkie.

== See also ==
- Geography of British Columbia
- Geology of British Columbia
