= Wilkie (surname) =

Wilkie is a surname of Scottish or German origin, which is medieval pet form of the personal name William. An alternative spelling is Wilkey, and a related German surname is Wilke. The surname Wilkie may refer to:

- Alan Wilkie (disambiguation), several people
- Allan Wilkie (1878–1970), British actor
- Alex Wilkie (born 1948), British mathematician
- Alexander Wilkie (1850–1928), British politician
- Andrew Wilkie (born 1961), Australian politician
- Andrew Wilkie (geneticist) (born 1959), at Oxford University
- Andrew Wilkie (zoo director) (1853–1948), of Melbourne, Australia
- Bill Wilkie (1922–2017), Scottish musician
- Bob Wilkie (footballer) (1920–2001), Australian Rules footballer
- Bob Wilkie (ice hockey) (born 1969) Canadian ice hockey player
- Clare Wilkie (born 1974), British actress
- David Wilkie (artist) (1785–1841), British painter
- David Wilkie (ice hockey) (born 1974), American ice hockey player
- David Wilkie (surgeon) (1882–1938), British surgeon
- David Wilkie (swimmer) (born 1958), British swimmer
- Dougie Wilkie (born 1956), Scottish footballer
- Douglas Wilkie (1909–2002), Australian journalist
- Elsie Wilkie (1922–1995), lawn bowls competitor from New Zealand
- Gordon Wilkie (born 1940), Canadian ice hockey player
- Horace W. Wilkie (1917–1976), American politician
- Ian Angus Wilkie (born 1960), British actor
- J. Scott Wilkie, Canadian lawyer
- Jack Wilkie (footballer, born 1876), Scottish footballer
- Jack Wilkie (footballer, born 2003), Scottish footballer
- Jean Baptiste Wilkie (1803–1886), American Métis chief
- John Wilkie (1860–1934), American journalist and head of the Secret Service
- John Wilkie (canoeist) (born 1977), Australian slalom canoeist
- John Wilkie (footballer) (born 1947), Scottish footballer
- Kim Wilkie (born 1959), Australian politician
- Kyle Wilkie (born 1991), Scottish footballer
- Lee Wilkie (born 1980), Scottish footballer
- Lefty Wilkie (1914–1992), American baseball player
- Leslie Wilkie (1878–1935), Australian artist and gallery director
- Malcolm Richard Wilkey (1918–2009), American judge and diplomat
- Philip Willkie (1919–1974), American businessman
- Reginald Wilkie (1907–1962), British ice dancer
- Rob Wilkey (born 1956), American politician
- Robert Wilkie (born 1963), American lawyer
- Robert J. Wilke (1914–1989), American actor
- Vincent Wilkie (born 1969), German musician
- Wendell Willkie (1892–1944), American lawyer and politician
- William Wilkie (1721–1772), Scottish poet

== See also ==
- Willkie
- Willke
- Wilke
