= Poplar Creek, British Columbia =

Poplar Creek
- Location of Poplar Creek in British Columbia
- Coordinates: 50°24′59″N 117°08′04″W
- Country: Canada
- Province: British Columbia
- Region: West Kootenay
- Regional district: Central Kootenay
- Area codes: 250, 778, 236, & 672
- Highway: Highway 31

Poplar Creek is a ghost town in the West Kootenay region of southeastern British Columbia. The former mining community is at the mouth of Poplar Creek on the southwest side of the Lardeau River. The locality, on BC Highway 31, is about 37 kilometres (23 mi) northwest of Lardeau (head of Kootenay Lake) and 16 kilometres (10 mi) southeast of Gerrard.

== Name origin ==
The settlement, also known as Poplar City or Poplar, was named after the creek. Both sides of the creek were lined with Balm of Gilead trees, which early prospectors mistook for poplar.

== Mining ==
In the early 1860s, placer mining occurred at the creek mouth. Staked before 1903, the Spyglass claim lay about 18 kilometres (11 mi) upstream from the mouth. Owned by John Winquist and partners, this was one of the richest silver-gold claims in the district. Although located in 1901, the discoverer of the Lucky Jack failed to record the find. In July 1903, Hamilton, Morgan and O'Connor staked this gold claim, which lay on the south side of the creek near the railway track. Armed guards were posted to protect the property. Tunnels were excavated, as was the case at the Swede mine, 2.4 kilometres (1.5 mi) up the creek. By September, an influx of prospectors had established a permanent camp. That month, Great Northern Mines acquired the Lucky Jack and Swede groups. In November, R.G. McLeod paid a deposit on the Spyglass and settled the balance on the $35,000 purchase of the mine the following August. At the time, many smaller mining operations existed. The Lucky Jack, like many properties, became tied up in litigation, caused by legitimate and fraudulent overlapping claims.

Machinery ordered for the Great Northern properties in 1905 did not arrive before the winter. By 1906, few prospectors remained in the area. In 1909, the mining recording office closed, which reflected that negligible production had occurred during the previous years. About this time, some activity took place at the Swede group. Also, several gold dredging operations existed on the creek and a few years later on the river. In 1914, mining was partially revived after years of limited activity. Several properties were worked to varying degrees over the following years.

In 1928, Spyglass-McLeod was incorporated to acquire the Spyglass group, and a new tunnel was developed. In 1930, new management was appointed at the company to extract the silver ore. In 1939, a large placer mining enterprise began on the creek.

Later production was not significant. Over the decades, exploratory work has been conducted at the Lucky Jack and Swede, most recently as 2017. Exploratory drilling last took place at the Spyglass in 1979.

== Ferry and bridge across the river ==
The profitable ferry, which operated across the Lardeau in the vicinity of the creek during 1903, was replaced in April 1904, when a government bridge was completed. The next month, a brush fire set the bridge alight. Assumedly, any damage was repaired. That July, a non-government bridge was built across the mouth of the creek. In 1908–09, the river bridge was rebuilt. The longevity is unclear, because later references to the Poplar Creek bridge more likely refer to the creek bridge.

== Community ==
The townsite was surveyed in August 1903. When the Nugget newspaper began publication that December, six hotels, four stores, a livery stable, and laundry existed. A post office operated 1903–1954. The mining boom was over by the time the newspaper ceased publication in October 1904.

In 1911, fire destroyed the nearby shingle mill.

After mining dwindled, the place continued as a small logging centre. By 1953, the population numbered only seven and a hotel and general store still operated, surrounded by abandoned buildings. All the earlier buildings have since disappeared and only a few scattered later residences remain.

== Railway ==
The northwestward advance of the Arrowhead and Kootenay Railway rail head passed through Poplar Creek in May 1902. Tracklaying on this Canadian Pacific Railway (CP) subsidiary was completed to the foot of Trout Lake in early June. Although work trains immediately carried passengers and freight, CP did not assume control until the beginning of August.

Most likely opened in 1903, the train station and siding were initially called MacInnes, named after either Angus McInnes, a local mining recorder, or Thomas Robert McInnes, sixth Lieutenant Governor of British Columbia, who signed the act to grant the charter. In 1942, CP abandoned the line.

Train Timetables (Regular stop or Flag stop)
	Mile	1903	1905	1909	1912	1916	1919	c.1922	1929	1932	1935
Gerrard	33.1	Regular	Regular	Regular	Regular	Regular	Regular	Regular	Regular	Regular	
MacInnes	23.7	Regular	Regular	Both	Both						
Poplar	23.1			Regular	Regular	Flag	Both	Flag	Flag	Flag	
Gold Hill	19.8				Flag	Flag	Both	Flag	Flag	Flag	
Bosworth	16.3	Regular	Regular	Regular	Regular	Flag	Both	Flag	Flag	Flag	

== Maps ==
- "Perry's mining map". wwwdavidrumsey.com. 1893.
- "BC auto map". www.davidrumsey.com. 1925.
