= Galena Bay =

- Location of Galena Bay in British Columbia
- Coordinates: 50°40′00″N 117°51′00″W
- Country: Canada
- Province: British Columbia
- Elevation: 460 m (1,510 ft)
- Area codes: 250, 778

Not the Galena Bay on Kootenay Lake at Riondel

Galena Bay is an unincorporated locality, on the bay of the same name, at the head of Upper Arrow Lake in the West Kootenay region of southeastern British Columbia.

The Sinix't Nation, or Lake People, used the bay annually, at least, for hunting and fishing. A productive run of kokanee salmon ("redfish" in the local parlance) would have made it an attractive camp in the autumn. The Sinix't name for the bay mean "the place to make canoes" because the large cottonwoods made excellent dugouts. In 1894, the shooting of Cultus Jim, a Sinix't man, was an infamous event that followed several violent interactions between the Sinix't and white settlers, recounted by Parent. Cultus Jim was protecting his family's traditional right to camp in Galena bay and was shot by a settler, Samuel Hill, who had homesteaded a farm in Galena Bay in 1893. Hill was not charged and the creek that empties into Galena Bay was named for him.

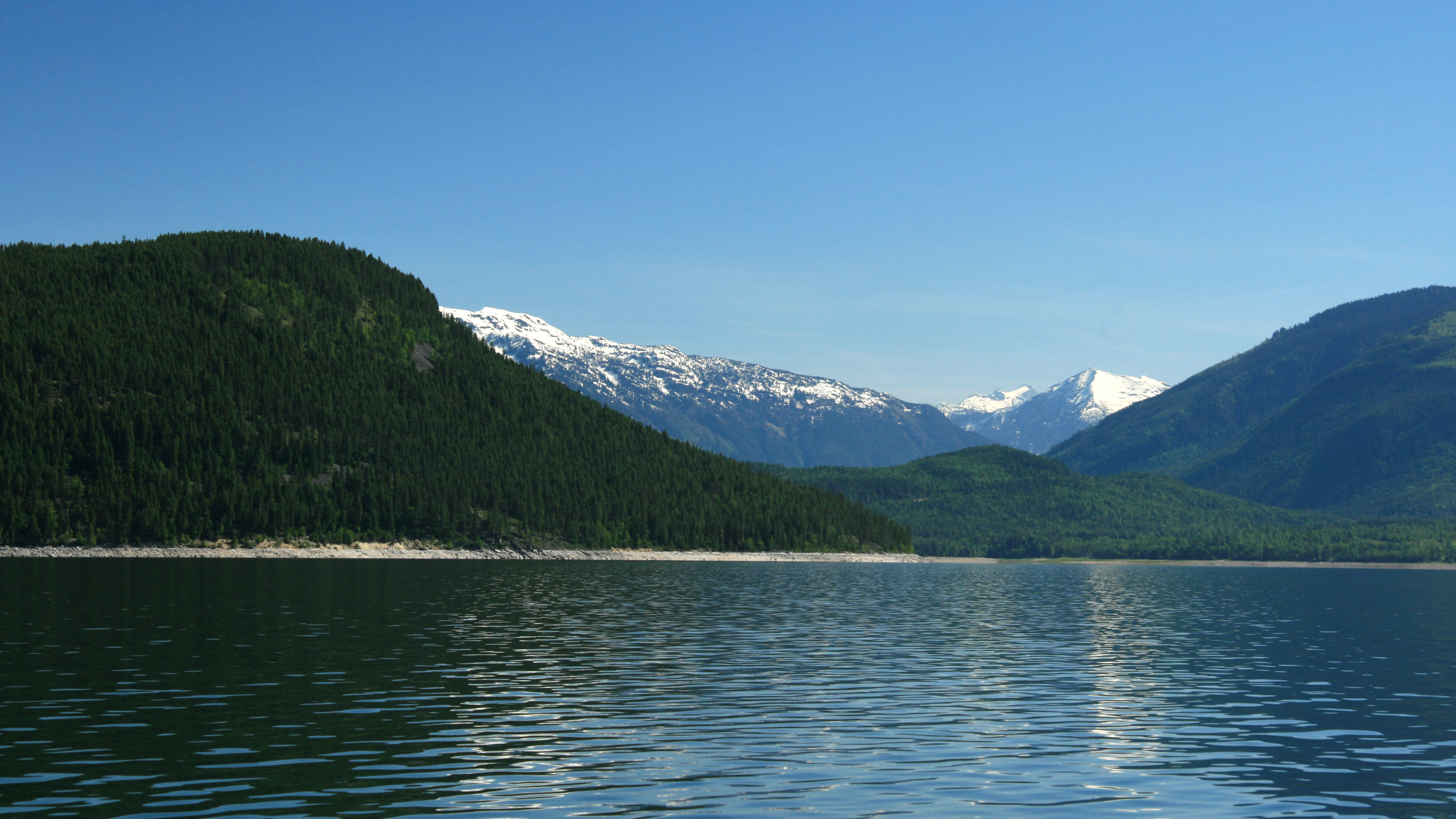
Galena Bay, British Columbia at right. Windy Point, on the end of the peninsula, is at centre-left.

The bay was formerly called Thumb Bay, because it had the appearance of a giant thumb on early maps, but was renamed Galena Bay by 1890. Significant galena mining occurred in this area. In 1897, a townsite called Rosenheim was cleared, and a hotel built, for a planned railway linking with Camborne and Trout Lake, but the project evaporated within a year. Galena Bay remained the name of the neighbourhood.

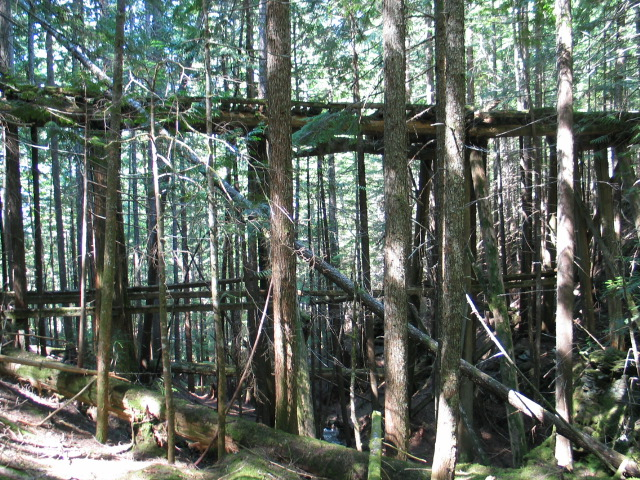
Railway trestle above Galena Bay, 2005.

In 1897, solicitors gave notice of a proposed steamship on Trout Lake (a mining centre some 20 km northeast) and a railway from the town of Trout Lake to Galena Bay. It was never built; however, a short rail line was built to bring the giant old-growth cedar, fir, hemlock, spruce and white pine logs down the mountain to mills in Galena Bay and on the peninsula, including a cedar shake mill on Windy Point. Its road bed can still be seen in several parts of Galena Bay and on the hillside above the community. A trestle bridge still remained as of 2005 across a ravine above the new highway.

A 162 ha (400 acre) townsite was surveyed and lots were sold. People also took up Crown land grants of 65 ha (160 acres) up Hill Creek and across the bay on the east side. Provincial land records record that Lot 2110, on the east side of Galena Bay with considerable waterfront, was sold as a land grant to William C. Marsdin in 1898 for US $170. This lot was eventually sold to John Nelson, who became famous for buying the paddle-wheeler Minto in a derelict condition and letting it deteriorate on his foreshore until BC Hydro built the Keenlyside Dam in 1967 and ordered the ship removed prior to the flooding of the new reservoir. It fell to John's son, Walter Nelson, to tow the derelict out into the lake and burn it.

The elegant Hotel Rosenheim was built in Galena Bay around 1899. A school was built.

In 1957, the locality became the eastern terminal for the Arrowhead–Galena Bay ferry. A road—they called it a highway, but it was not—was built from Nakusp, around Galena Bay with a timber bridge across Hill Creek, and across the peninsula to the ferry landing. The old ferry landing was on the north side of the peninsula, opposite the town of Arrowhead across the Beaton Arm. It is still a popular swimming spot because a shelf of bedrock eliminates a muddy foreshore.

In 1967-1968, BC Hydro raised the lake about 50 metres to create a reservoir as part of the Columbia River Treaty with the United States of America. This necessitated relocating the highway to a new grade above the town, on a straight line towards Trout Lake. The new highway was completed in 1973 with a turnoff to a new ferry landing down the shoreline from Galena Bay (it connected with a new Highway 23 across the lake at Shelter Bay) and another turnoff (never paved) into Galena Bay.

Since 1968, the western terminal has been Shelter Bay. This ferry link forms part of British Columbia Highway 23 from Nakusp to Revelstoke. Galena Bay is also the terminus of British Columbia Highway 31, which runs northeast, then southeast via Trout Lake and Lardeau and then south down the west side of the north arm of Kootenay Lake to Balfour, near Nelson.

== See also ==
- Comaplix, British Columbia
- Beaton, British Columbia
- Arrowhead, British Columbia
