= Incomappleux River =

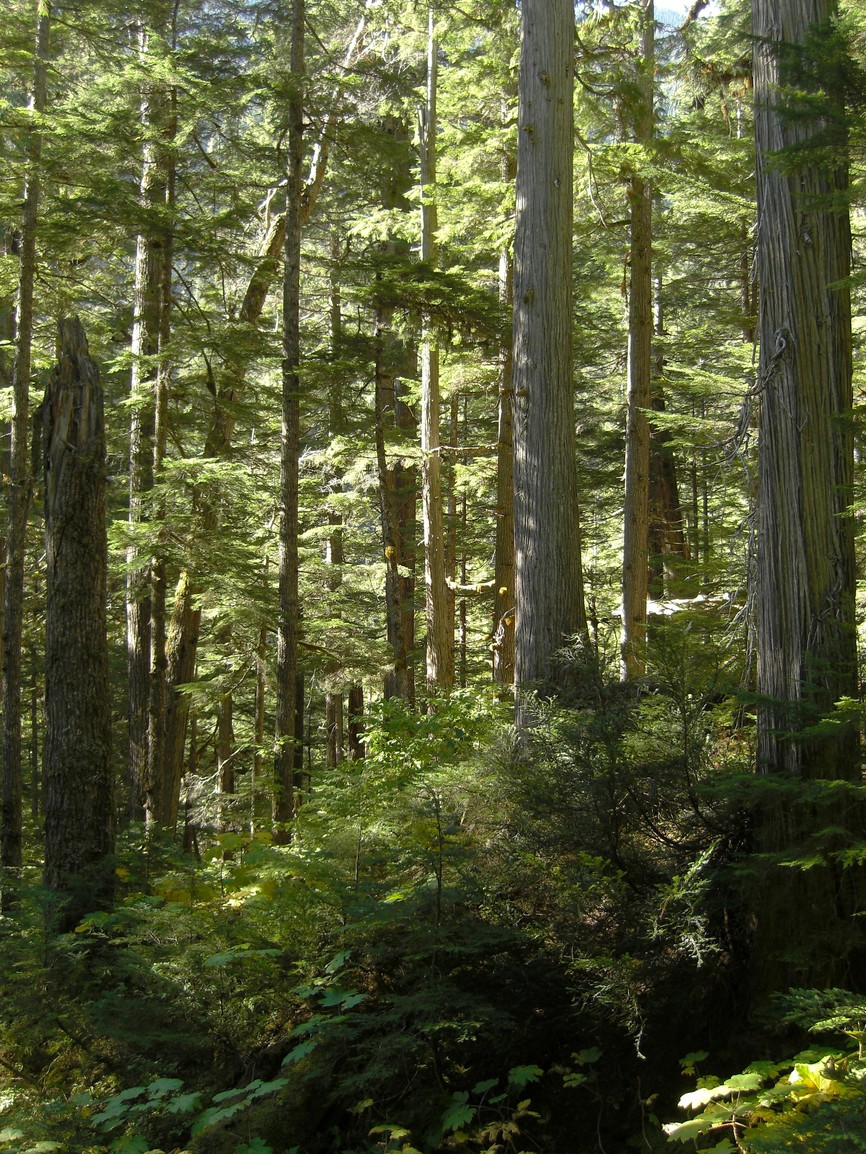
- Incomappleux inland rainforest

- Location in British Columbia

Location
- Country: Canada
- Province: British Columbia
- District: Kootenay Land District

Physical characteristics
- Source: Illecillewaet Neve
  - location: Selkirk Mountains
- Mouth: Columbia River
  - location: Upper Arrow Lake
  - coordinates: 50°44′48″N 117°42′47″W
- Basin size: 1,020 km^{2} (390 sq mi)
- Discharge
  - location: near Beaton
  - average: 55.8 m^{3}/s (1,970 cu ft/s)
  - minimum: 4.76 m^{3}/s (168 cu ft/s)
  - maximum: 570 m^{3}/s (20,000 cu ft/s)

Basin features
- Progression: Incomappleux Valley

The Incomappleux River is in the West Kootenay region of southeastern British Columbia, Canada. Entering the Beaton Arm of Upper Arrow Lake, the river is a major tributary of the Columbia River. The upper reaches of the Incomappleux valley are home to some of the only inland temperate rainforest in the world.

The area has been studied since 2000 by Valhalla Wilderness Society as a part of their Inland Temperate Rainforest campaign, and the upper Incomappleux was included in the Selkirk Mountain Caribou Park proposal after groundbreaking biodiversity research by biologists Toby Spribille and Curtis Björk, sponsored by Valhalla Wilderness Society, found over 300 species of lichens in the Incomappleux, most of them in the ancient forest. This included seven species new to science. The Incomappleux Valley has been the subject of two films, one by Riel Marquardt, and more recently the VWS film Primeval: Enter the Incomappleux, by award winning documentary filmmaker, Damien Gillis. VWS Director Craig Pettitt and biologist Amber Peters toured the province with the film. The Incomappleux Valley was declared a conservancy in 2023 but the remainder of the Selkirk Mountain Caribou Park proposal, containing critical old growth inland rainforest corridors still remains unprotected. The valley is in the traditional territory of the Sinixt First Nation and its protection was supported by the autonomous Sinixt.

== First Nations ==
The name "Incomappleux" is derived from the nsyilxcn word nk'mapeleqs, meaning "point at end (of lake)". This refers to the northeastern tip of Upper Arrow Lake into which the river empties. The names of the creek and adjacent mountain are also derived from this word. A Sinixt village by this name formerly existed somewhere in the confluence area.

== European presence ==
Europeans referred to the valley and river by various English spellings of the word, but Fish Creek/River was also common. However, local lore has it that the word is a corruption of the Sinix't word for Fish. In 1865, James Turnbull, surveyor and mapmaker, explored the Incomappleux Valley. After the mid-1880s, visitors could enter the valley from the Canadian Pacific Railway (CP) main line, moving southward through the Glacier National Park area into the valley and following the river to its mouth, but this involved a long climb up and over a high mountain and a long trek down to the river. In 1889, the report of the Gold Commissioner at Farwell reported, "By 1889, ten locations [staked mine sites] had been made on the Northeast area of Upper Arrow Lake. Several claims, including the Fish Creek mines, had been worked on the upper reaches of Incomappleux river..."

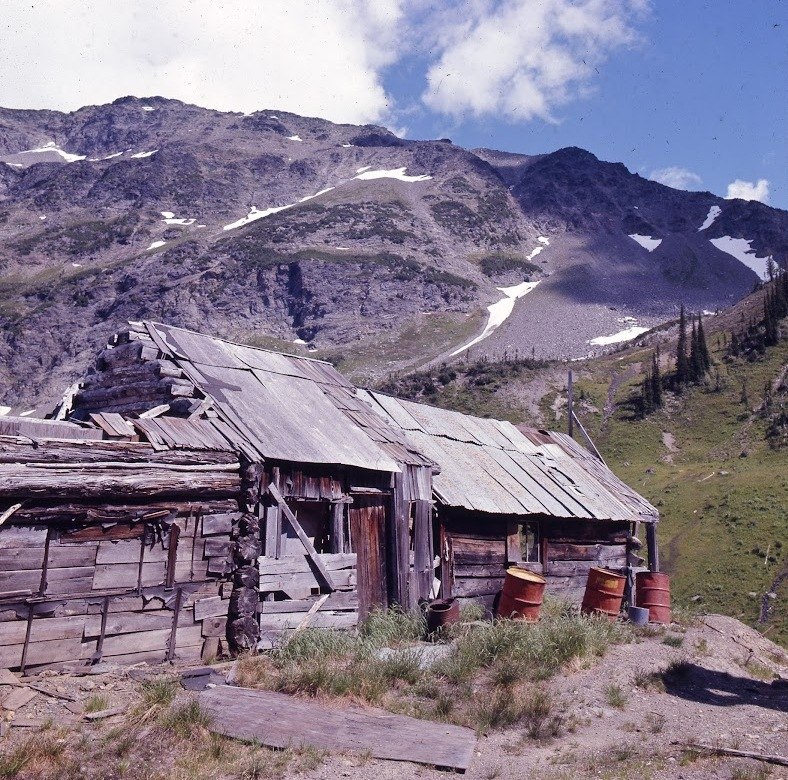
Beatrice Mine buildings above the town of Camborne in the Incomappleux River valley, B.C.

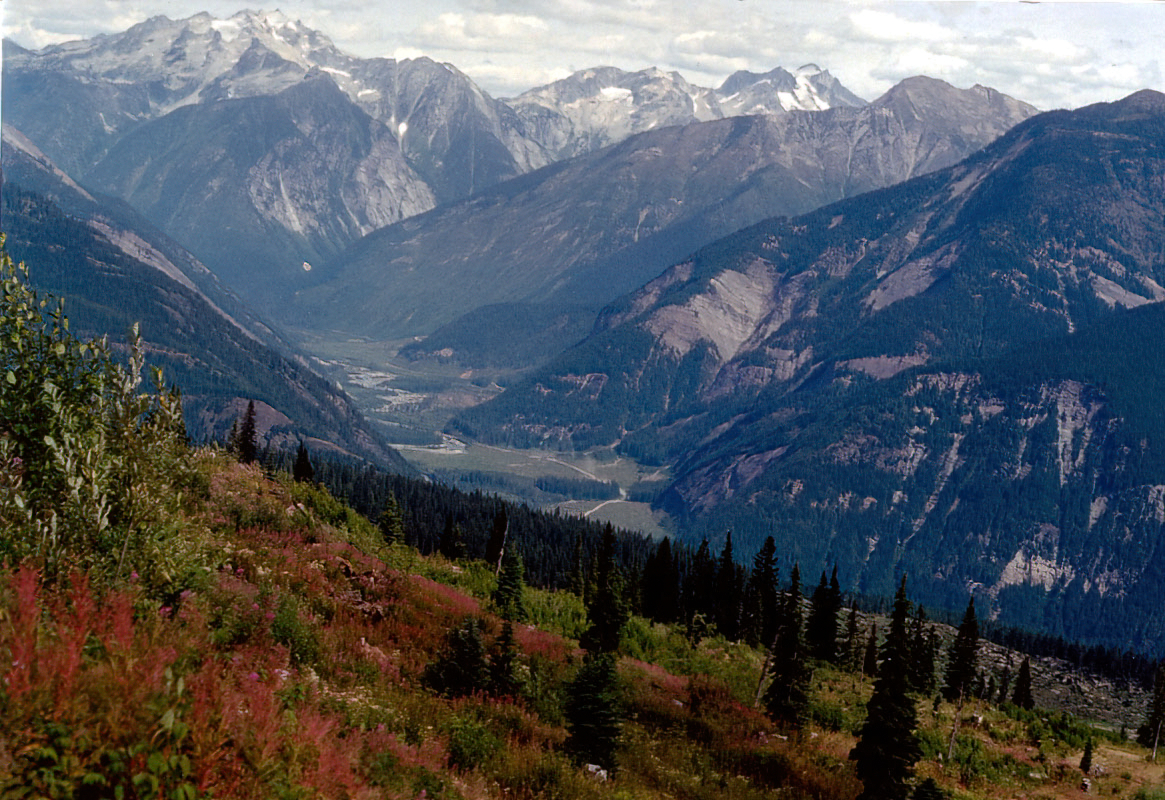
Battle Range viewed from the left (west) side of the Incomappleux River valley, looking north, 1996. Glacier National Park is beyond the Battle Range.

The area around Roger's Pass was surveyed by Arthur O. Wheeler in 1902, using a photographic triangulation method that involved setting up a heavy camera on a tripod on a mountain peak and photographing all the other peaks within sight; and doing this again for all the peaks in the survey area. This survey provided the first topographic maps of Glacier National Park, the Battle Range that borders the park on the south, and the area of the upper Incomappleux River valley.

Access was from the south end through a deep, narrow, steep-sided gorge where the miners built a roadway about 0.5 km long out of timbers perched on the side of the cliff and anchored into rock crevices. In winter, horses pulling wagons were fitted with snowshoes for the deep snow. The timber/plank road was still in place and drivable in 1970, although some of the timber supports had fallen away, planks were broken and a sign warned, "ROAD CLOSED". In 1974, Celgar, the logging company based in Nakusp, blasted a solid road through the gorge, destroying the old timber/plank road.

== Mines ==
From the 1890s, mining claims staked upstream (removed from the mouth) were along Pool Creek at 10 kilometres (6 mi), Sable Creek at 18 kilometres (11 mi), and Boyd Creek at 26 kilometres (16 mi). Although most claims were accessed from the south, the Dunvegan group, at the headwaters of the river, was reached by a 16-kilometre (10 mi) trail from the CP station at Albert Canyon.

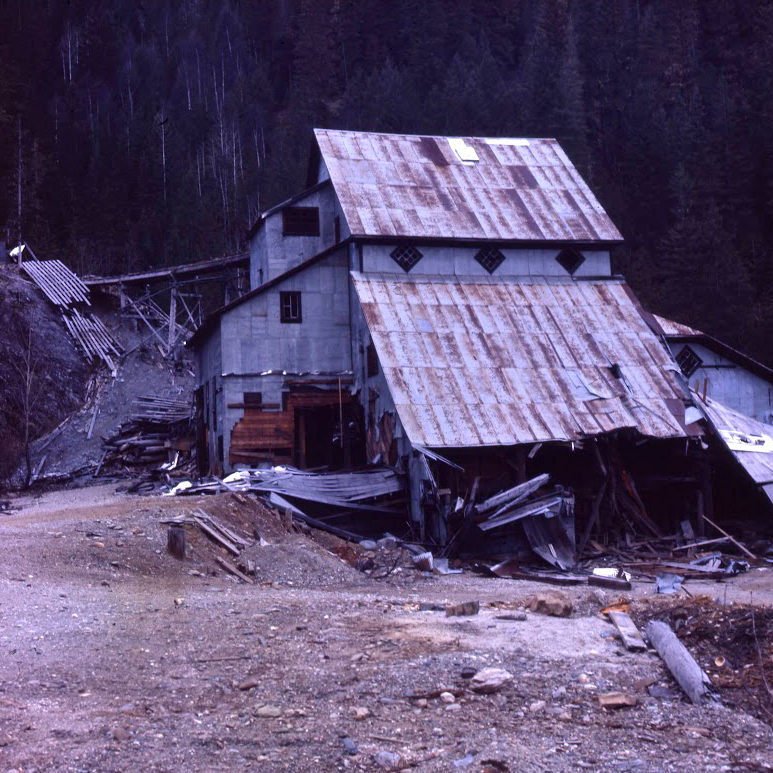
Ore concentrator building at Camborne, 1973.

The town of Camborne was built in 1902 in the lower valley, just upstream from the gorge, to service the mines. The principal mine was the Beatrice Mine, about 9.7 km up a steep trail from the town. Its owners built an ore concentrator at the upper end of the town site; horse-drawn ore carts would dump their loads into a sort of chute at the last switchback above the concentrator. The town was occupied until about 1954.

Nearby towns were Beaton on the Northeast Arm, just below the mouth of the Incomapplex; Galena Bay on the main lake to the south; and Trout Lake, over Galena Pass to the northeast, in the Lardeau River valley.

== Source ==
Formed in the Selkirk Mountains southeast of Glacier, the Illecillewaet Glacier near Rogers Pass is the source of the Illecillewaet River on the northwestern slope. However, the Illecillewaet Neve, which feeds the glacier, primarily flows south into the Incomappleux River.

== Course ==
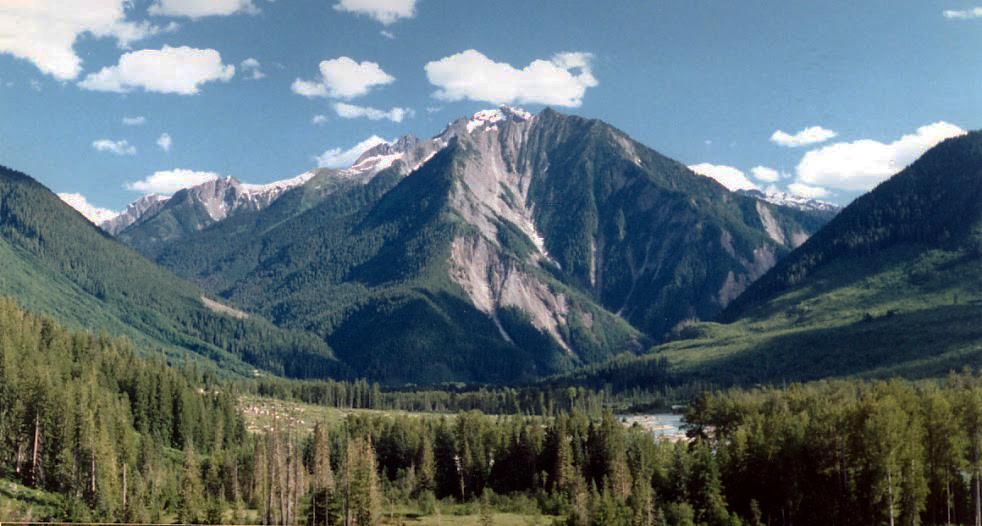
Incomappleux River valley looking downriver; Boyd Creek entering from the left. 1974.

The Incomappleux is about 68 kilometres (42 mi) long, with four large tributaries flowing 19 to 32 kilometres (12 to 20 mi). Following a due south course, the swift, unnavigable river is 9 to 15 metres (30 to 50 ft) wide. Around 61 metres (200 ft) high, the narrow canyon, which is about 5 kilometres (3 mi) from the mouth, funnels the glacial waters. Above the canyon, the valley widens to as much as 2 kilometres (1 mi).

=== 2003 river incident ===
In 2003, two experienced alpinists (Michel Bastien and Yves Laforest), a videographer (Aurélie Chabaud) and a multimedia student (Martin Champagneur) set out to climb Mount Hope for a childhood cancer charity then descend the Incomappleux River by kayak to Upper Arrow Lake at Beaton, British Columbia. Just hours into the river journey, their kayaks were swept away by the rapids. Of the four adventurers, only Champagneur survived and was found by rescuers six days after the incident occurred. Searches continued for two weeks until being called off by national park wardens and RCMP.

== Forestry ==
The valley is heavily timbered and unsuited to agriculture. This inland temperate rainforest comprises a wide range of cottonwood and spruce. The accessible conifer-dominated forest has been largely harvested over the decades. Active logging returned in 1974, but environmental protests have restricted harvesting since the early 2000s. In 2022, a moratorium was placed upon logging for at least two years.

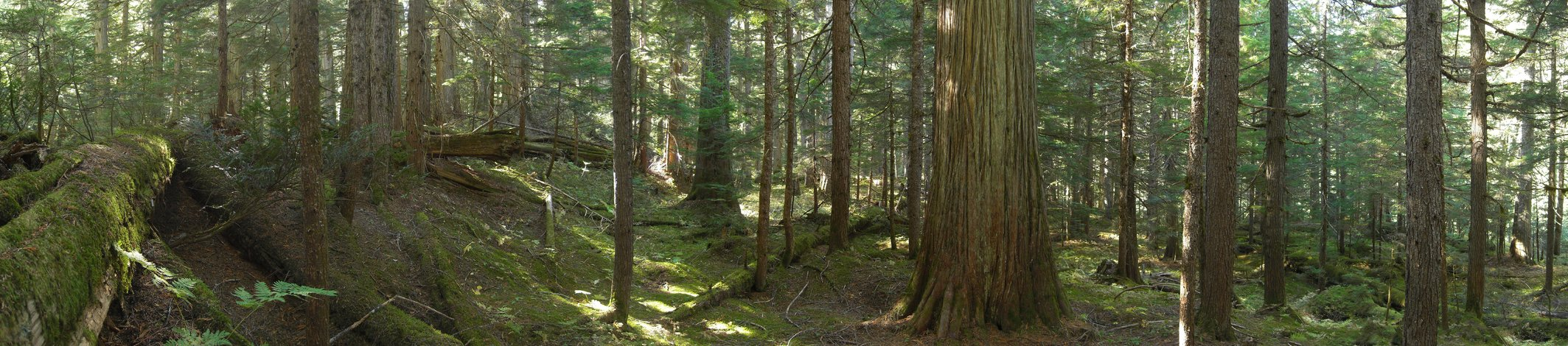
Incomappleux Inland Rainforest, BC, 2010.

== Ferries and bridges across the river ==
In 1892, a 76-metre (250 ft) bridge existed at the river mouth, and a 14-metre (46 ft) one 32 kilometres (20 mi) upstream near McDougal Creek. After the one at the mouth connecting to Lardeau City was washed out, a temporary 5-by-12-metre (18 by 40 ft) cable ferry commenced in June 1893. A replacement bridge destroyed by the 1894 flood was in turn replaced. A ferry was built in summer 1896, but its placement is unclear.

The lower bridge provided a connection in 1898, when the wagon road up the west side of the river was completed as far as the Camborne ferry. That year, a ferry was installed across the river at Boyd Creek, which could carry six loaded packhorses.

In 1904, the wagon road was extended up the west side of the river from Camborne, and a bridge replaced the ferry at Boyd Creek. At the 12-mile point, a wagon road bridge existed in the 1910s. The only remaining bridge, 2.4 kilometres (1.5 mi) north of Camborne, was a wooden timber bridge that had washed out by 1971. Celgar, the logging company based in Nakusp, built a steel bridge in the same place in 1974.

== Conservation ==
The 58,000 hectare Incomappleux Valley conservancy was established by the provincial government in January 2023. Conservancies are a class of protected areas in the province that allow some low-impact commercial and industrial uses, but prohibit activities such as large scale logging and road construction.

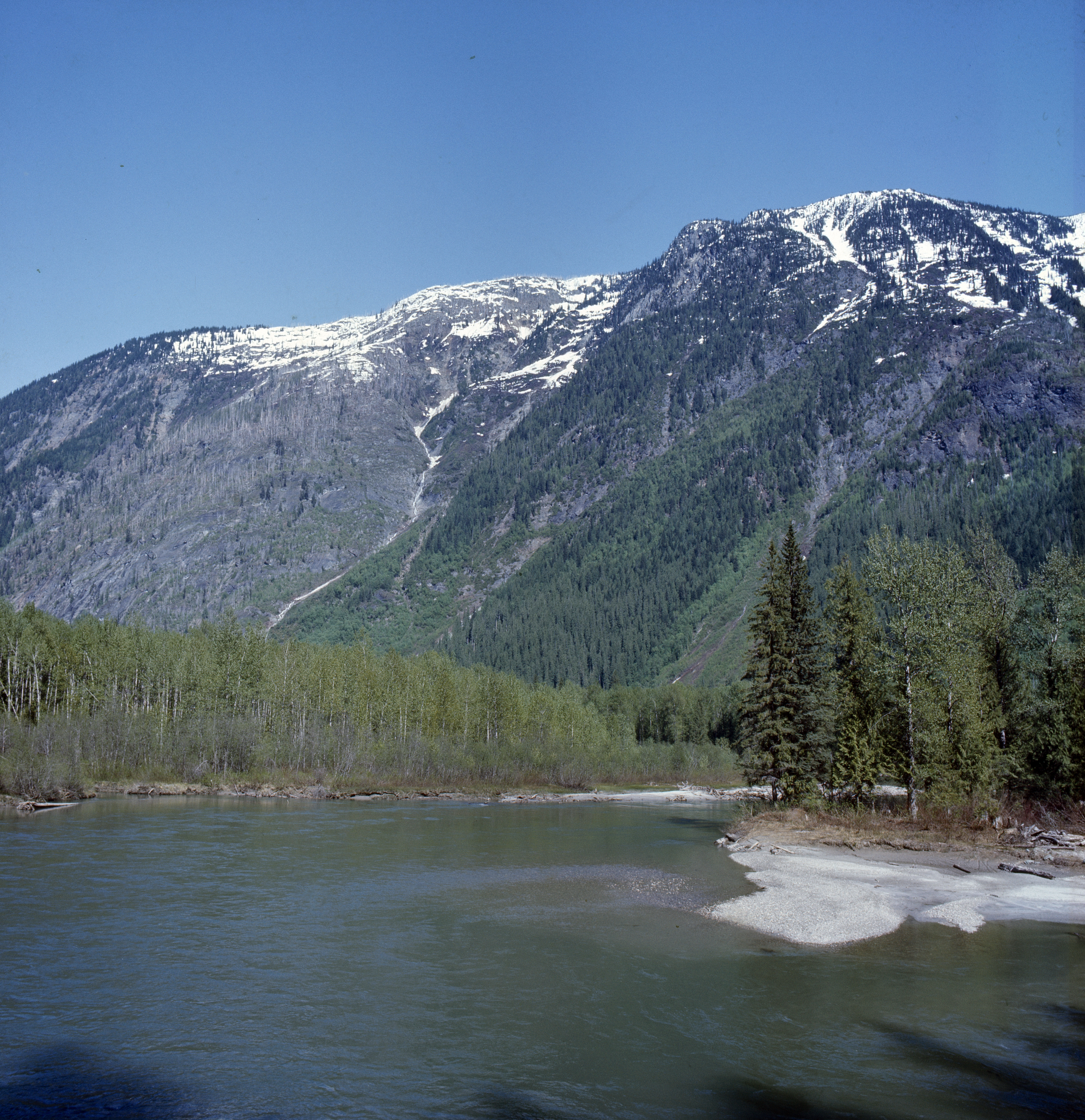
Incomappleux River from the (then) new steel bridge a little upstream from Camborne, about 1975

== Maps ==
- "Perry's mining map". wwwdavidrumsey.com. 1893.
- "BC auto map". www.davidrumsey.com. 1925.
- A. O. Wheeler's 1905 report is accompanied by a series of large, fold-out topographical maps, as well as historical maps for the region that he reproduced.

== Discharge ==
Daily discharge tables 1914–1996 for the 1,020-square-kilometre (390 sq mi) basin.

== See also ==
- List of rivers of British Columbia
