= Willsie =

Willsie is a surname. Notable people with the surname include:

- Brian Willsie (born 1978), Canadian ice hockey player
- David Willsie (born 1968), Canadian wheelchair rugby player and coach
- Harry Willsie (1928–2003), Canadian sport shooter

== See also ==
- Willkie
