= Wilke =

Wilke is a surname of German origin, which is medieval pet form of the personal name Wilhelm. A related English surname is Wilkie. The surname Wilke may refer to:

- Alexandra Wilke (born 1996), German basketball player
- Axel Downard-Wilke (born 1966), New Zealand transport planner
- Birthe Wilke (born 1936), Danish singer
- Christian Gottlob Wilke (1788–1854), German theologian
- Günther Wilke (1925–2016), German chemist
- Gustav Wilke (1898–1977), German general
- Hannah Wilke (1940–1993), American artist
- Henry F. Wilke (1857–1931), American politician
- Julius A. R. Wilke (1860–1914), American sailor
- Kristof Wilke (born 1985), German rower
- Marcel Wilke (born 1989), German footballer
- Marina Wilke (born 1958), German rowing cox
- René Wilke (born 1984), German politician, mayor of Frankfurt (Oder)
- Richard B. Wilke (1930–2025), American Methodist bishop and writer
- Robert J. Wilke (1914–1989), American actor
- Rudolf Wilke (1873–1908), German artist
- Ulfert Wilke (1907–1987), American artist
- Wotan Wilke Möhring (born 1967), German actor

== See also ==
- Wilkes (surname)
- Wilkie (surname)
- Willke
- Willkie
