= Trout Lake, British Columbia =

Trout Lake
- Location of Trout Lake in British Columbia
- Coordinates: 50°38′50″N 117°32′20″W
- Country: Canada
- Province: British Columbia
- Region: Lardeau Valley, West Kootenay
- Regional district: Central Kootenay
- Elevation: 725 m (2,379 ft)
- Area codes: 250, 778, 236, & 672
- Highways: Highway 31

Trout Lake is an unincorporated community in the West Kootenay region of southeastern British Columbia. The former steamboat landing is at the north end of Trout Lake. The locality, on BC Highway 31, is by road about 177 kilometres (110 mi) north of Nelson and 90 kilometres (56 mi) by road and ferry southeast of Revelstoke.

== Early community ==
Named after the lake, the new townsite of Trout Lake City was marketed in 1893. That year, a general store, Trout Lake Hotel, and Queen's Hotel, opened.

In 1895, the completion of the wagon road initiated a stage service to Thomson's Landing (Beaton). In 1897, the route extended to Ferguson. That year, a sawmill was set up, construction boomed, a constable took up residence, and the weekly Trout Lake Topic was launched. Also, the Lakeview Hotel and Windsor Hotel opened.

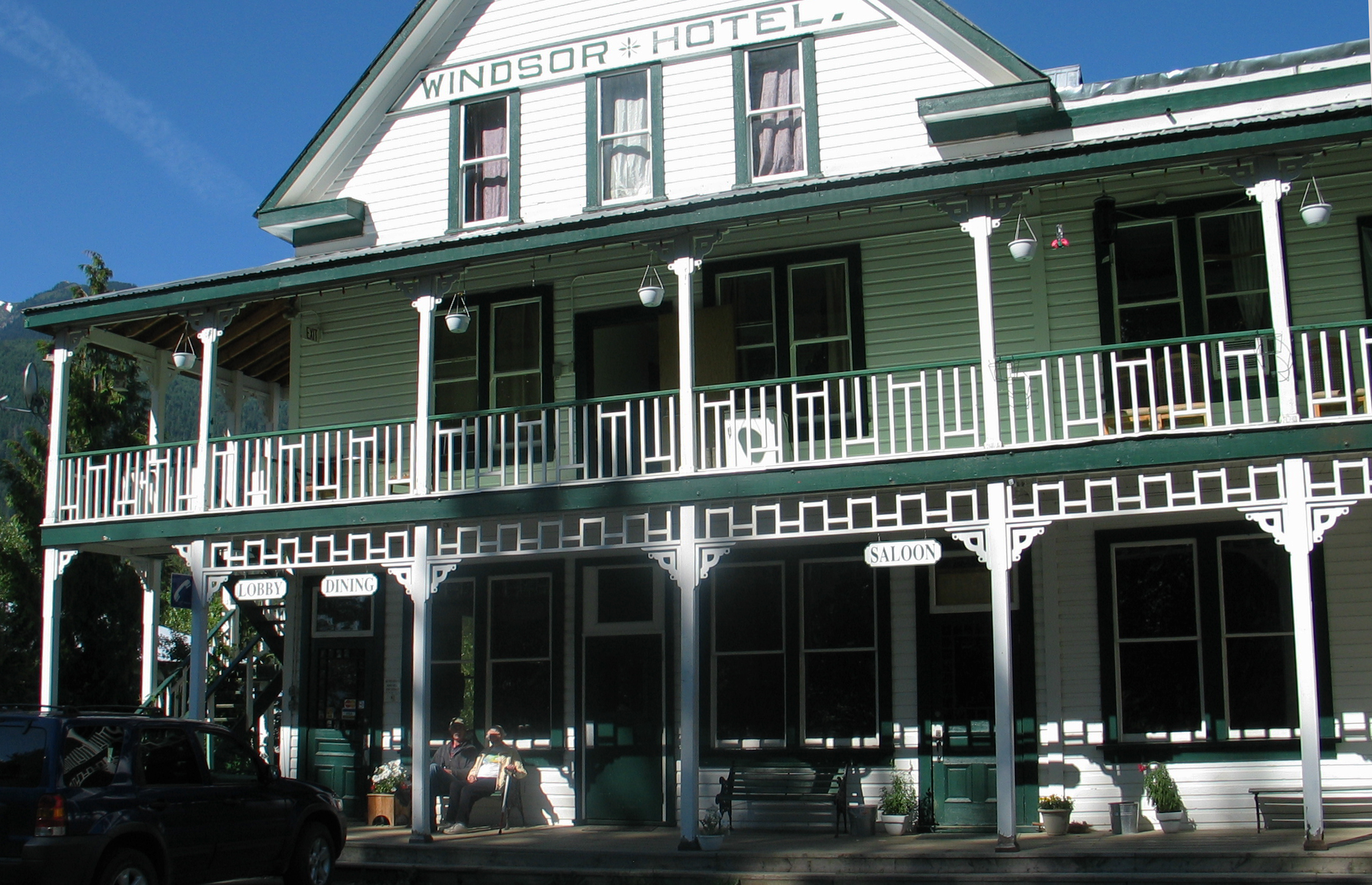
The Windsor Hotel in Trout Lake, B.C., in 2008, one of the oldest hotels in the province, although it is no longer operating as a hotel.

By 1898, complementing the hotels and sawmill were four general stores, a meat market, drugstore, assayer, printer, barber, blacksmith, three livery stables, schoolhouse, and government buildings. Earlier that year, a telephone link was established via Comaplix. In 1899, sidewalks were added to the main streets.

During 1902, the Methodist Church and Odd Fellows hall (hall/commercial premises complex) were built. The hospital, completed in 1903, opened in 1904. Whereas the Ferguson Imperial Bank branch operated January 1902 to April 1904, the Trout Lake branch operated September 1903 to November 1906.

In 1904, the Anglican Church was built, the Park Hotel opened to the northwest, Ferguson's Lardeau Eagle amalgamated with the Trout Lake Topic to create the Lardeau Mining Review, and the town water supply system came on line. Following rivalry and bitterness, once encouraged by the respective newspapers, harmony developed between the two towns. That year, a new larger sawmill opened, went bankrupt, and closed. The planing mill restarted a year later and the sawmill the following month. Closing three months later, the machinery was relocated to Gerrard.

In 1906, the Queen's Hotel burned to the ground. By 1910, only the Lakeview and Windsor hotels provided accommodation.

In 1909, a shingle mill opened, which also supplied electricity to the community. In summer 1916, new machinery doubled capacity, but fire totally destroyed the complex within months. The following summer, the rebuilt mill opened.

The constable arriving in 1915, but enlisting months later, does not appear to have been replaced.

In 1922, Robert Madden's former Lakeview Hotel burned to the ground. That year, fire destroyed the former Odd Fellows hall (a general store and hall below with the upstairs converted to a residence).

The population was about 1,000 by 1900, 80 by 1920, 50 by 1939, 28 by 1945, and 7 by 1959.

The post office operated 1895–1954. Soon after, the Ferguson post office relocated to Trout Lake, but closed in 1979.

== Mining and transportation ==
Silver discoveries in the area led to extensive prospecting from 1890 onward. Prior to the 1902 opening of the railway to Gerrard and subsequent wintertime lake freezing, ore was temporarily stored awaiting conveyance by lake boat. In 1954, the Trout Lake–Gerrard road was completed.

== Later community ==
The settlement contains about 40 permanent residents and many recreational properties for visitors attracted by the scenery and fishing. The historic Windsor Hotel has survived. Outside the general store stands a functioning, hand-pumped, glass-enclosed, gravity-fed gasoline pump. The store is the original Hladinec Esso garage. The No-Board Cafe, a coffee shop/cafe, opened in 2006.
