= Willkie =

Willkie is a surname. Notable people with the surname include:

- Philip Willkie (1919–1974), American banker
- Wendell Willkie (1892–1944), American lawyer and politician; 1940 Republican Party presidential nominee

== See also ==
- Wilkie (surname)
- Willkie Farr & Gallagher, international law firm
- Wendell Willkie (relief), plaque created by artist Paul Fjelde
- Wilke
- Wilkie (disambiguation)
- Willke
- Willikies
