= Mount Cooper (British Columbia) =

Mountain in British Columbia, Canada

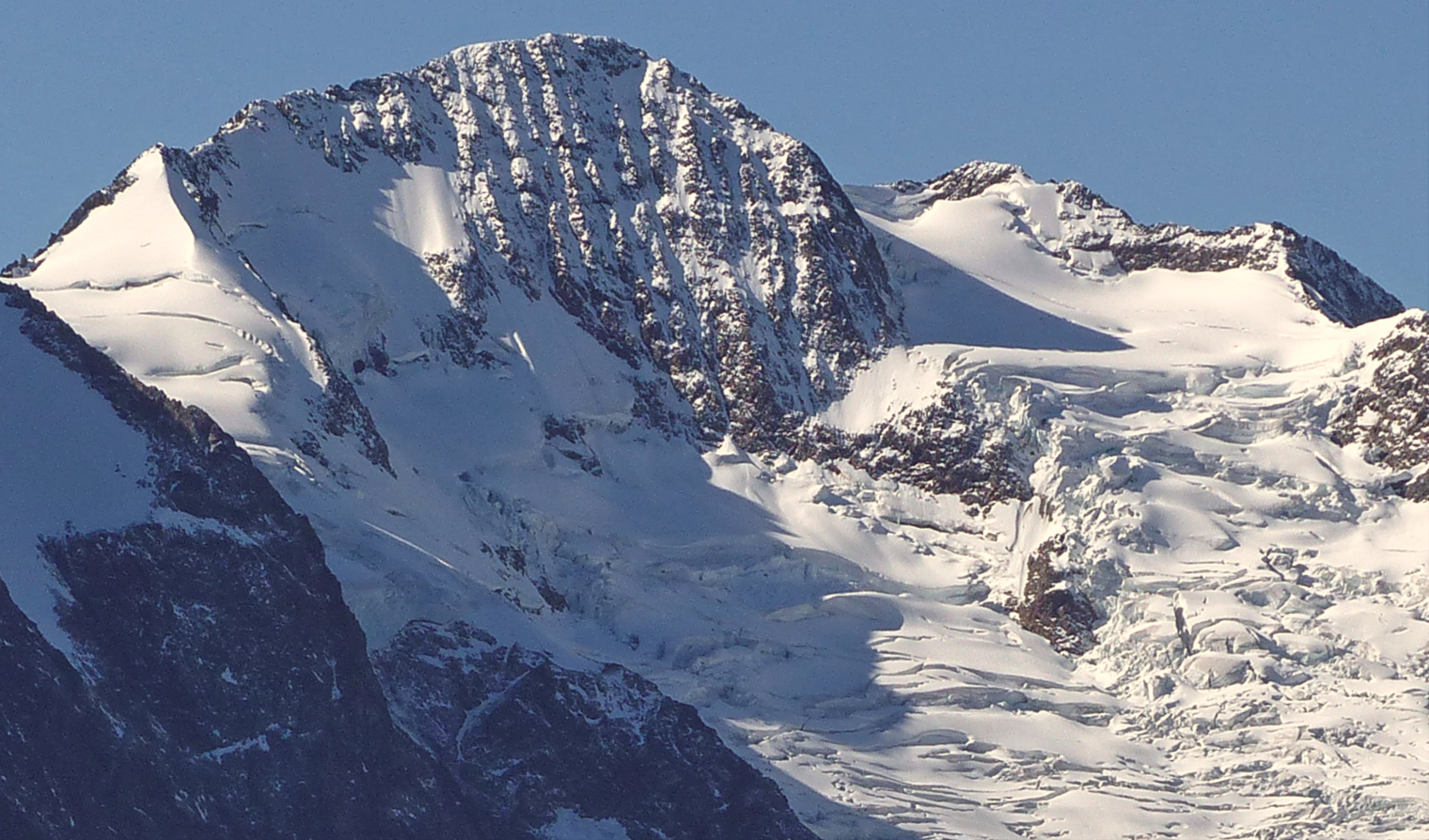
- Mount Cooper, northeast aspect

Highest point
- Elevation: 3,094 m (10,151 ft)
- Prominence: 2,319 m (7,608 ft)
- Parent peak: Nautilus Mountain (3130 m)
- Listing: Mountains of British Columbia; Ultras of Canada 20th; Canada highest major peaks 62nd; Ultras of North America
- Coordinates: 50°10′47″N 117°11′57″W

Geography
- Location within British Columbia Location within Canada
- Location: Goat Range Provincial Park; British Columbia, Canada
- District: Kootenay Land District
- Parent range: Goat Range; Slocan Ranges; Selkirk Mountains; Columbia Mountains
- Topo map: NTS 82K3 Roseberry

Climbing
- First ascent: August 10, 1962

Mount Cooper is a prominent 3,094-metre (10,151 ft) glaciated mountain summit located in the Selkirk Mountains of southeast British Columbia, Canada. It is situated 36 km (22 mi) northwest of Kaslo, within Goat Range Provincial Park. Mt. Cooper is the highest peak in the Goat Range and Slocan Ranges, which are subsets of the Selkirks. The nearest higher peak is Truce Mountain, 33 km (21 mi) to the east-northeast. The first ascent of Mount Cooper was made August 10, 1962, by William Boulton, Terry Beck, Richard Hahn, Lorna Ream, Jack Steele, Edward Bouttin and Gary Johnson via the Spokane Glacier. This climbing party was from the Spokane Mountaineers organization. The mountain was named in association with Cooper Creek, which in turn was named after an 1880s Kaslo prospector and trapper. The mountain's name was officially adopted June 9, 1960, when approved by the Geographical Names Board of Canada. Prior to 1960 it was called Cooper Mountain.

== Climate ==
Based on the Köppen climate classification, Mount Cooper has a subarctic climate with cold, snowy winters, and mild summers. Temperatures can drop below −20 °C with wind chill factors below −30 °C. Precipitation runoff from the mountain and meltwater from the Spokane Glacier drains east into Cooper Creek, a tributary of the Duncan River.

== See also ==
- Geography of British Columbia
