= Trout Lake (British Columbia) =

- Trout Lake in mid-February

- Location within British Columbia
- Location: British Columbia
- Coordinates: 50.5828°N 117.4222°W
- Type: ribbon lake
- Basin countries: Canada

Trout Lake is a ribbon lake in the West Kootenay region of southeastern British Columbia. Between the Selkirk Mountains to the west and the Purcell Mountains to the east, the lake is about 23 kilometres (14 mi) long and 1.6 kilometres (1 mi) wide. Lardeau Creek flows into the northern end and Lardeau River flows from the southern end. BC Highway 31 skirts the northeast shore. The northern end is about 90 kilometres (56 mi) by road and ferry southeast of Revelstoke.

== Name origin ==
In 1865, explorer James Turnbull noted in his diary a journey beside Lake de Truite, but did not indicate how he knew the lake's French name, only that the waters abounded in trout. The lake is labelled Lac des Truites on an 1871 map, Lardo Lake on an 1890 map, and Trout Lake in an 1889 newspaper article (which highlighted the immense size of the trout).

== Mining ==
Although mining claims have surrounded the lake, the predominance of mining activity has been near Ferguson and Trout Lake at the northern end. The discovery of the Great Northern and Silver Cup mineral claims led to extensive prospecting from 1890 onward.

In 1891, trails for miners were completed southeastward from Upper Arrow Lake and northwestward from Kootenay Lake. By the next year, horse packtrains operated from Thomson's Landing (Beaton). A sleigh road existed during the winter months. In 1893, packtrains commenced from Lardo (Lardeau).

In 1894, wagon road construction from Lardo almost reached Trout Lake City and from Thomson's Landing was 6 kilometres (4 mi) short of the town. The next summer, the road through the settlement was completed, replacing the packtrains with four-horse wagon teams. Over time, deterioration left only the Thomson's Landing road passable. Prior to the railway, inward journeys to the lake carried supplies, and the outward ones ore.

The Broadview, the Silver Cup, the Nettie Lake, and Ajax were the more significant properties. (See mining maps). By 1908, only the Silver Cup remained operational, ceasing production in 1914. The True Fissure and Blue Bell developed 1916–1939. Sporadic mining occurred in the area during the 1940s and 1950s.

The area experienced only limited production after the early years, but interest in development continues.

== Transportation ==
In 1898, a steamboat service was introduced. The next year, a new wharf was completed at Trout Lake City and the survey crews from rival railway companies either chartered the steamboat or acquired available boats. The steamboat ran a regular service up and down the lake.

For years, the Canadian Pacific Railway (CP), under the Arrowhead and Kootenay Railway (or Kootenay and Arrowhead) banner, conducted a charade indicating a Lardeau–Arrowhead line was imminent, purely to block the Kaslo and Slocan Railway, a Great Northern Railway subsidiary, from constructing along the route. The scheme included buying a third of the unsold lots at Trout Lake City. Such land sales by railway companies contributed significantly to track construction costs.

On completion in June 1902, the contractor initially operated the Lardo (Lardeau)–Gerrard line, and a lake boat connected with Trout Lake City. That August, CP commenced a three-times weekly Lardo–Trout Lake City rail/lake service. The 1,000-ton ore stockpile was completely removed by month end. The CP warehouses had accumulated the product since January. Even Revelstoke freight followed the new circuitous route via Nelson.

However, when winter ice closed the lake route, the original wagon road via Beaton provided a rudimentary and only access. CP were able to keep a channel open on the lake for the 1903/04 winter, but the usual winter closure was two to three months.

From 1904, a CP tug towed a six-car barge, which took the railway cars down the lake. Delivering the tug by rail from Lardo had proved challenging, because the breadth clearances were overly tight.

CP did not recommence ferry service in 1916 after the spring thaw. The rail service reduced to a locomotive and rolling stock barged in weekly from the Kaslo line. That August, the shingle mill leased the CP vessel and established a connecting weekly passenger/freight run.

A rail link to the north end of the lake never eventuated. The Lardeau–Gerrard line closed in 1942.

== Recreation ==
The presence of large rainbow trout, bull trout, and burbot cater to fishing. Hiking, horseback riding, mountain biking, and snowmobiling are popular on the trails throughout the surrounding hills.

== See also ==
- List of lakes of British Columbia
- Goat Range Provincial Park
