= Wilkie =

Wilkie may refer to:

== People ==
- Wilkie (surname), a surname (and list of people with the name)
- Wilkie Bard (1874–1944), American vaudeville and music hall entertainer
- Wilkie Clark (1920–1989), American entrepreneur and civil rights activist
- Wilkie Collins (1824–1889), English novelist, playwright, and author of short stories
- Wilkie Cooper (1911–2001), British cinematographer
- Wilkie D. Ferguson (1938–2003), American lawyer and judge
- Wilkie Rasmussen (born 1958), Cook Islands politician and former Cabinet Minister
- Wilkie Wilkinson (1903-2001), British auto mechanic and racing official

== Places ==
- Wilkie, Saskatchewan, a town in Canada
  - Wilkie (electoral district)
  - Wilkie Airport, an abandoned aerodrome located adjacent to Wilkie, Saskatchewan, Canada
- Wilkie, Missouri, a ghost town in the United States
- Lake Wilkie, a lake near Tautuku Bay in the Catlins, south of Dunedin, New Zealand
- Mount Wilkie, a mountain in Canada

== Other uses ==
- Wilkie, a former alpha male chimpanzee in the Kasakela Chimpanzee Community
- wilkies, a forward roll in gymnastics
