= Camborne, British Columbia =

Camborne
- Location of Camborne in British Columbia
- Coordinates: 50°46′59″N 117°38′04″W
- Country: Canada
- Province: British Columbia
- Region: West Kootenay
- Regional District: Columbia-Shuswap
- Area codes: 250, 778, 236, & 672

Camborne is a ghost town in the West Kootenay region of southeastern British Columbia. The former mining community was at the mouth of Pool Creek on the east side of the Incomappleux River. The locality is about 78 kilometres (48 mi) by road north of Nakusp and 91 kilometres (57 mi) by road and ferry southeast of Revelstoke.

== Name origin ==
In the late 1890s, John Cory Menhinick, mining recorder and engineer, pre-empted 76 hectares (188 acres), being the first open space above the canyon of Fish Creek/River (a common former name for the Incomappleux). He reputedly renamed the location, which was formerly called Fish Creek Camp, after the mining school he attended in the mining town of Camborne, Cornwall, England. The earliest newspaper reference is 1900. Common misspellings are Menhenick and Cambourne.

== Mining ==
In 1891, the initial trail for miners was cut to link with the northeast arm of Upper Arrow Lake. The first discoveries in the general area were at Pool Creek in 1892, which was about 10 kilometres (6 mi) from the river mouth. By the next year, bonded mining claims existed on this creek. About 3 kilometres (2 mi) upstream of this mouth, Mohawk Creek branches in a southeasterly direction. Exploratory work at the Beatrice mine on the Mohawk began in 1898. About that time, immediately northeast of Camborne on Lexington Mountain, the Eva gold claim and the adjacent Oyster-Criterion claim were staked. Siver, lead, zinc, and copper were the common ores found in the region. From 1900, the Beatrice was shipping ore. In 1902, the mining recording office relocated from the lumber town of Comaplix. At the Eva mine, exploratory tunnelling was completed, a power plant was installed to operate 10 machine drills, and 4 hectares (10 acres) were purchased at the townsite for a 10-stamp mill and eventual aerial tramway. The Oyster-Criterion mine had similar plans. In late 1903, the mill and tramway became operational at each mine.

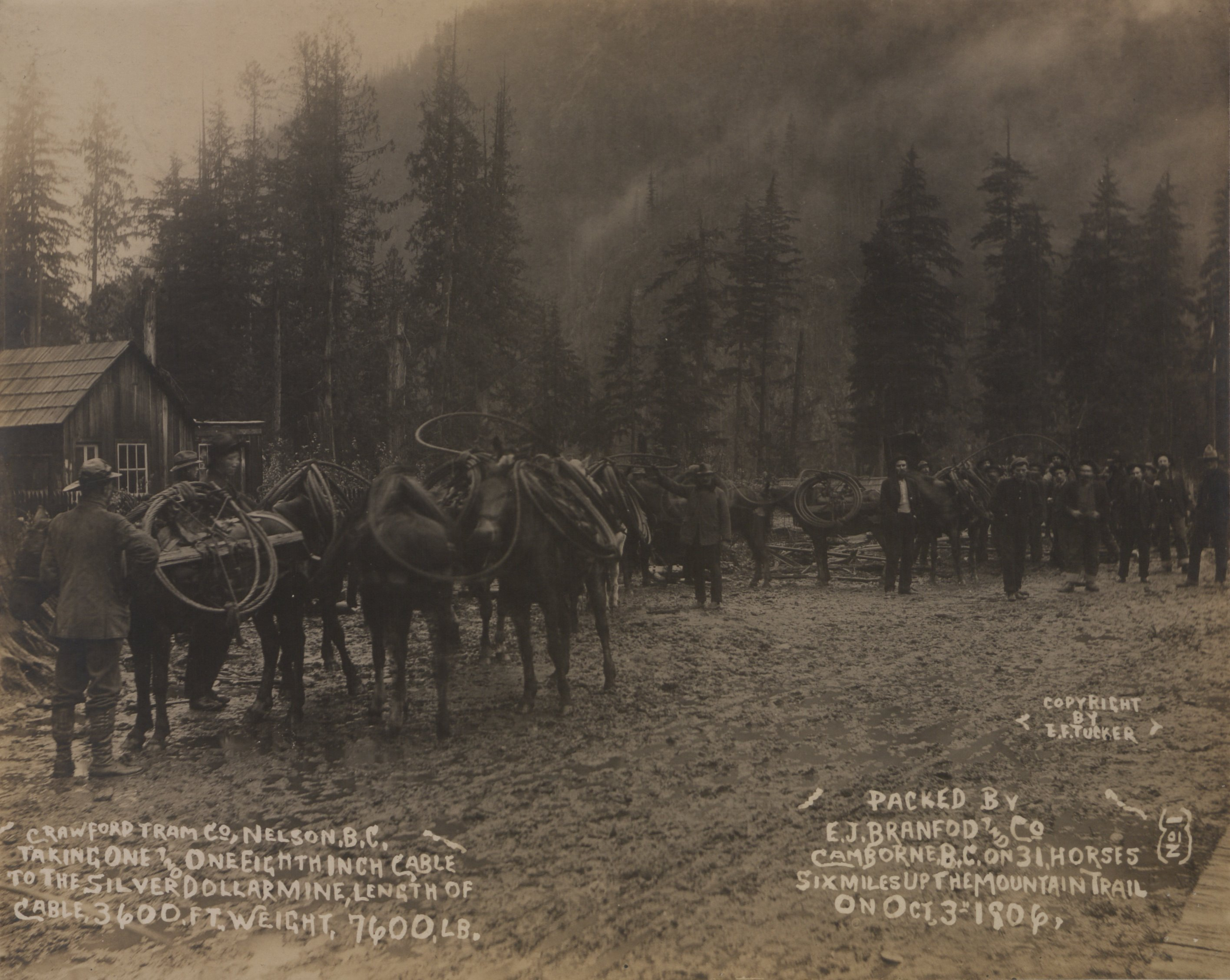
Cable being packed to the Silver Dollar Mine, 1906, E.F. Tucker, Photog.

In 1904, fires destroyed the Oyster-Criterion laundry, cookhouse, and bunkhouse and extensively damaged the Eva boarding house and tramway, but the infrastructure was immediately rebuilt. A rich vein of galena was discovered at the Beatrice. A new trail created for developing the adjacent Silver Dollar mine, switched the Beatrice ore hauling from via Ferguson to via Camborne. In the first half of 1905, the Eva and Oyster-Criterion were not producing, but a building program was underway at the Silver Dollar. The next year, exploration work occurred on the Spider claim at the mouth of the Mohawk, and a stamp mill and aerial tramway were installed at the Silver Dollar. September rain and floods extensively damaged the Eva and Oyster-Criterion plants. Mining activity diminished, and Camborne mines were virtually mothballed by 1909. In 1917, some activity occurred at the Beatrice and Spider (a property controlled by Multiplex).

Acquired by the Meridian Mining Co in 1932, the Eva and Oyster-Criterion infrastructure was restored and a new hydroelectricity dam and compressor house built. The next year, Meridian installed a new tramway, and the Mt Poole Mining Co acquired the Silver Dollar and Multiplex claims. In 1936, the Meridian suspended operations. In 1938, a 50-ton mill was installed at the Spider mine. In 1947, the Spider (renamed the Sunshine-Lardeau) incorporated as a public company, then converted to a private one. In 1948, the Meridian mining plant was dismantled. In 1950, the Sunshine-Lardeau erected a new mill and hydro plant and held an official opening in 1952. The first of two 16-room bunkhouses was erected in 1955. After one burned to the ground in 1957, it was rebuilt. When the mine closed in 1959, all temporary buildings were removed, and the site caretakers remained the only Camborne permanent residents.

== Ferries and bridges across the river ==
In 1893, a 17-metre (55 ft) bridge was erected across the river and a trail built up Pool Creek to the summit. In 1895, a new 18-metre (60 ft) bridge was erected across the river. By 1898, when the wagon road up the west side of the river was completed, a rowboat served the river crossing, because a bridge no longer existed at Camborne. The next year, a more substantial ferry was installed, which could carry five loaded packhorses, Guided by a cable, the ferry was known as the Pool Creek ferry. In 1900, the cable broke, sending five occupants downriver. In 1901, a new footbridge was erected, and a wagon road was built up the east side of the river. The ferry operated at least until 1903.

The only remaining bridge, which is 2.4 kilometres (1.5 mi) north, has existed at least from the 1920s.

== Community ==
The Pendragon Hotel, which opened in 1899, was two-storeys. The next year, B.E. Drew opened a general store, which was small and rudimentary, and the townsite was surveyed. In 1901, two barbershops opened, the Eva Hotel was erected, a phone room was added to the Pendragon, and a police constable was appointed. In 1902, the two-storey Criterion Hotel opened with 36 bedrooms and an attic that could accommodate 60 additional beds. That year, the Camborne Miner newspaper was founded, a jewellers opened, and a resident doctor arrived. The Pendragon was renamed the Coronation Hotel and expanded, the Drew store was enlarged, and the Reception Hotel neared completion. A post office existed 1902–1914 and 1935–1936.

In 1903, the budget Camborne Hotel opened, as well as a new general store, with the second floor being available as a public hall. That year, watermains were installed and a school established. In 1904, Sunday store closing was introduced, but the resident doctor left at yearend. The next year, a jailhouse was erected, and two general stores merged. The closure of the newspaper in 1906 was an ominous sign. In 1910, the three main hotels closed, and the drugstore, the only remaining business, closed the next year. With nine pupils enrolled, 1910–11 was the final school year. In 1914, the Criterion Hotel burned to the ground. By 1921, Camborne was almost a ghost town, but the vacant buildings remained in good condition. In 1923, the Coronation Hotel reopened. becoming taxed by the resurgence of mining activity in the early 1930s. Around 1935, a general store opened but closed the following year.

The long-abandoned site has returned to forest.

== Goldfields ==
About 3 kilometres (2 mi) north, on the west shore of the river at the mouth of Menhinick Creek, the townsite of Goldfields was surveyed in 1901 to serve the Goldfinch claim. The next year, two stores, a hotel, river bridge, powerhouse, and stamp mill, were erected. The 30-room Northwestern Hotel had electric lighting. That December, a daily Beaton–Camborne–Goldfields stage run commenced.

By summer 1903, Goldfields was deserted and the large hotel closed, soon replaced by the Goldfinch Hotel, which was renamed the Home Hotel, then The Pavilion in 1904. The mine closed that January, and a forest fire destroyed the bunkhouses and upper terminal of the tramway later in the year. The former large hotel was demolished in 1905. In 1906, fire-damaged infrastructure was rebuilt, but September flood damage included the sweeping away of the river bridge. The mine did not reopen.

In 1933, the Dalhousie Mining Co acquired the Goldfinch claims but no production ensued.
