= Ferguson, British Columbia =

Ferguson
- Location of Ferguson in British Columbia
- Coordinates: 50°41′00″N 117°29′00″W
- Country: Canada
- Province: British Columbia
- Region: Lardeau Valley, West Kootenay
- Regional district: Central Kootenay
- Elevation: 922 m (3,025 ft)
- Area codes: 250, 778, 236, & 672
- Highways: off Highway 31

Ferguson is an unincorporated community in the West Kootenay region of southeastern British Columbia. The near ghost town is immediately northwest of the confluence of Ferguson Creek into Lardeau Creek. The locality, on Ferguson Rd and off BC Highway 31, is by road about 183 kilometres (114 mi) north of Nelson and 96 kilometres (60 mi) by road and ferry southeast of Revelstoke.

== Name origin ==
In 1891, prospector David Ferguson arrived in the region. By early 1894, he lived at the Forks (referring to the confluence) but named his ranch Ferguson City. Within months, he had renamed the property St. David’s and found three small gold nuggets on his land. The next year, he built a hotel. The strategic location was a short distance from several notable mines. However, he did not announce the development of his new town, named Ferguson, until 1896. Locally, the name Lardeau Forks must have been in common use, because it was used in the 1897 Henderson's directory. The townsite survey was not completed until late 1898.

== Early community ==
In 1897, the Lardeau Hotel opened. By 1899, Ferguson had a main street with hotels, shops and saloons, and a population of 800.

Launched in 1900, the newspaper was called The Eagle, immediately renamed The Ferguson Eagle, and then The Lardeau Eagle three months later. In 1904, the paper amalgamated with the Trout Lake Topic to create the Lardeau Mining Review. Rapid expansion made Ferguson almost as significant as Trout Lake City for a period. Following rivalry and bitterness, once encouraged by the respective newspapers, harmony developed between the two towns.

By 1918, only two hotels remained. By 1920, the place was almost deserted. The Lardeau Hotel stood into the 1970s.

== Mining and transportation ==
In 1897, the Thomson's Landing–Trout Lake City stage service extended to Ferguson.

Ferguson supplied nearby mines in the surrounding mountains such as the Broadview, True Fissure, Nettie L., and Silver Cup. Production had dwindled by the 1970s. In 2006, five mines to the west of Ferguson were consolidated into the Thor deposit, which reactivated gold production in 2017.

== Later community ==
Although comprising several scattered residences, the buildings of the former township have disappeared with time. Since the early 2000s, lots on the main street have been sold as recreational properties.
