= Goat Range Provincial Park =

Provincial park in British Columbia, Canada

- IUCN category Ib (wilderness area)
- Location within British Columbia
- Interactive map of Goat Range Provincial Park
- Location: Central Kootenay, British Columbia, Canada
- Coordinates: 50°17′00″N 117°17′00″W
- Area: 79,124 ha (305.50 sq mi)
- Established: July 12, 1995
- Governing body: BC Parks

Goat Range Provincial Park is a provincial park in British Columbia, Canada.

The park was established to protect unique species such as the (protected) Gerrard Rainbow Trout (the largest in the world-up to 50 lb) and the distinct colour group of "White Grizzly" for which some hoped the park would be named. There are no facilities in this wilderness park, other than rudimentary trails and backcountry campsites. The park is 879.47 km^{2} in size, is located between Slocan Lake (S) and Trout Lake (N), bordering Kootenay Lake The regions surrounding the park are known for its mining ghost towns from the days of the "Silvery Slocan" silver and galena rush to its south and also in the Lardeau country around Trout Lake and the north end of the Arrow Lakes.

This park allows hiking, pets on leash, cycling, and wilderness camping. It does not allow fishing in most of the park due to conversation.

Goal Range Provincial Park is the only natural habitat for the "Gerrard" rainbow trout.

Wild life in this area include but are not limited to elk, grizzly bears, mountain caribou, mountain goats, and wolverines.
