= Wilkie, Missouri =

Extinct town in the American state of Missouri

Coordinates: 38°53′22″N 90°23′55″W

Wilkie is an extinct town in St. Charles County, in the U.S. state of Missouri. The GNIS classifies it as a populated place.

A post office called Wilkie was established in 1894, and was discontinued that same year. The community has the name of John Wilkie, a pioneer settler.

It functioned as a station in the southern part of the Portage Des Sioux Township. It was sometimes called Wilkie Station. It was named in honor of John Wilkie, who was born in Hanover, August 12, 1823, and migrated to America in 1842, where he served in the militia during the Civil War. He started as a farm hand and eventually acquired almost a section of land.

Wilkie can now be found at Barwise Road in St. Charles County.
