= J. Scott Wilkie =

Canadian lawyer

J. Scott Wilkie is a Canadian lawyer, currently a Distinguished Professor of Practice at Osgoode Hall Law School, York University. He was previously the Chair and Governor of Canadian Tax Foundation and Co-Editor of its journal Canadian Tax Journal.
