= Kaslo =

Village in British Columbia, Canada

- Village
- Village of Kaslo
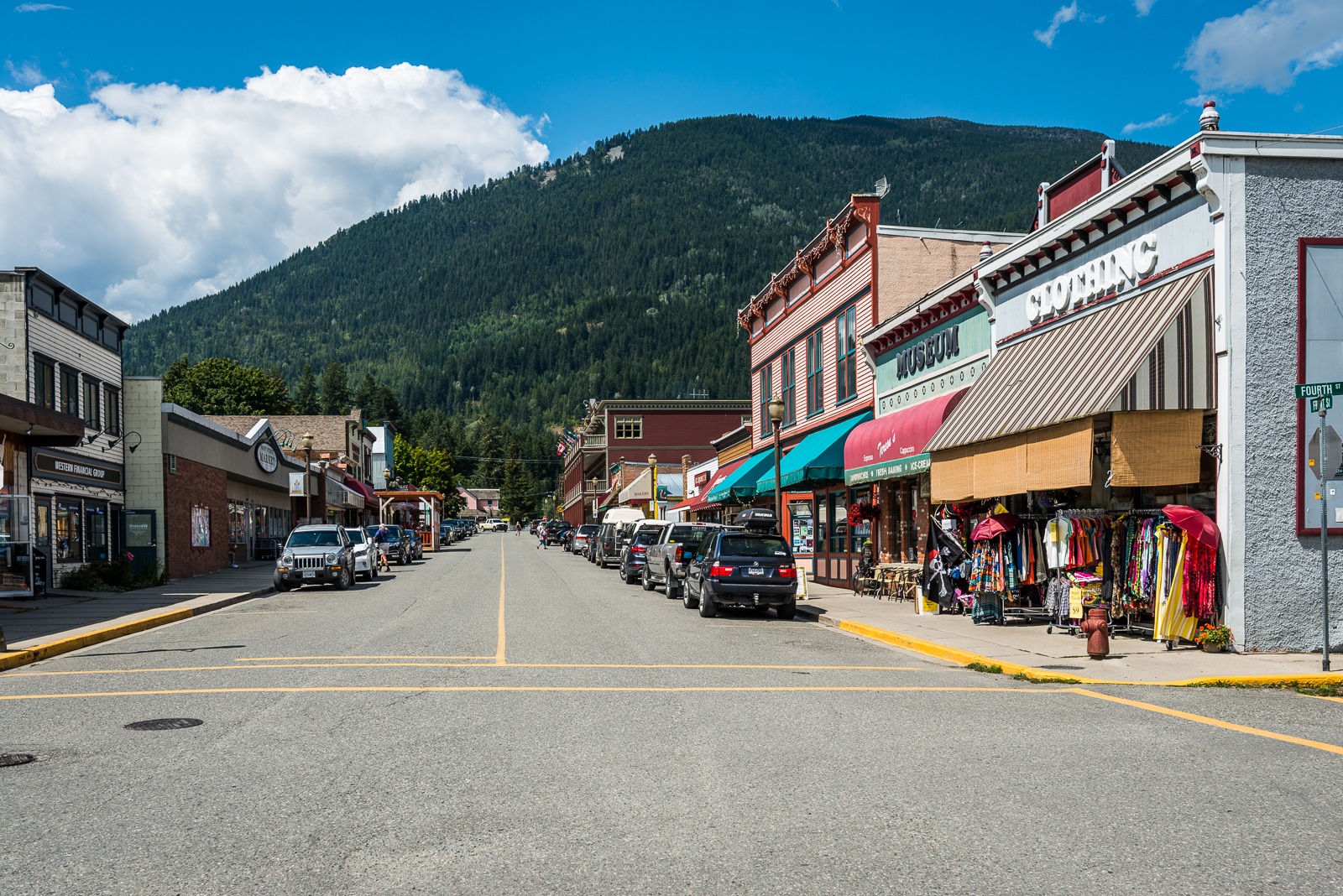
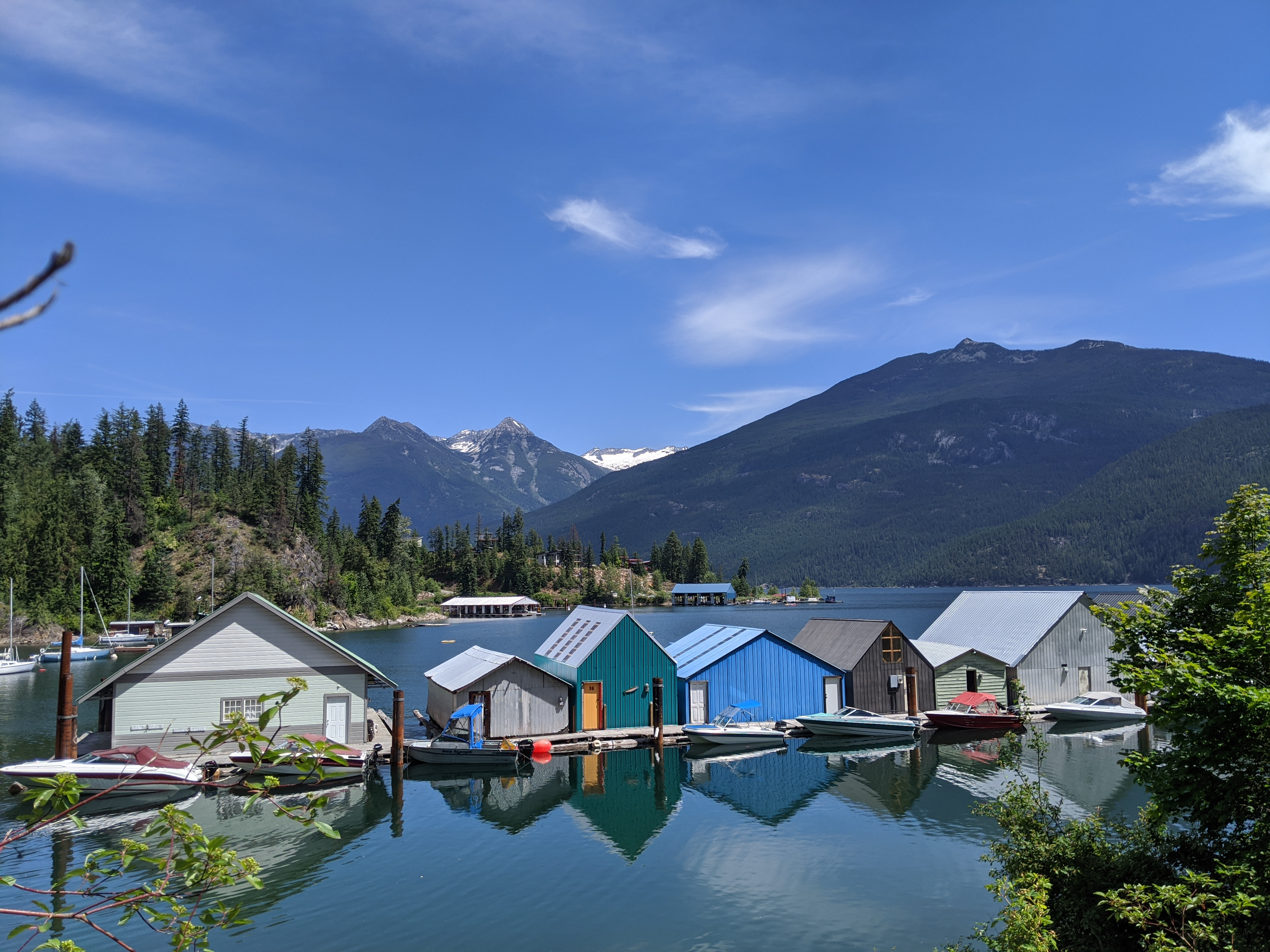
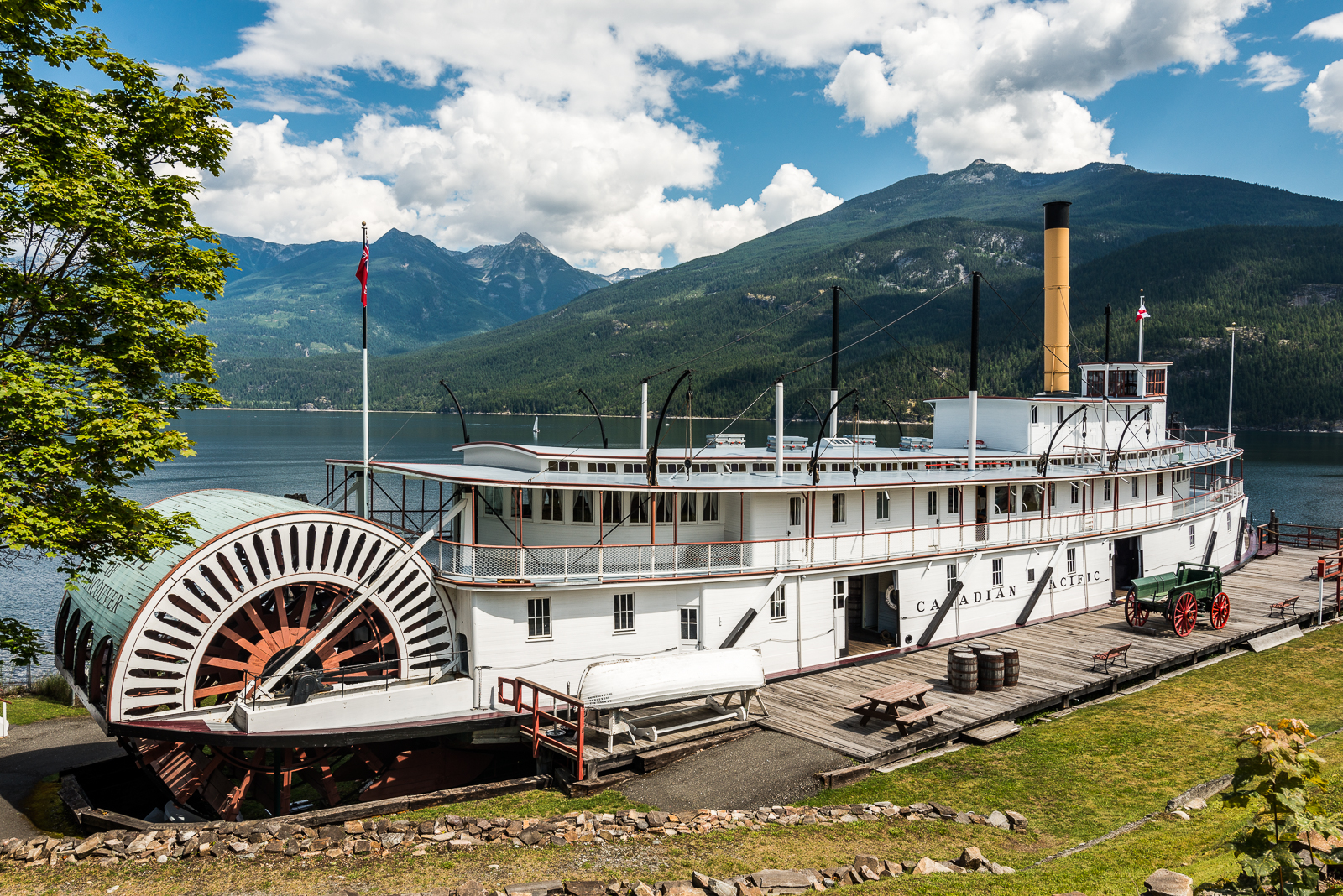
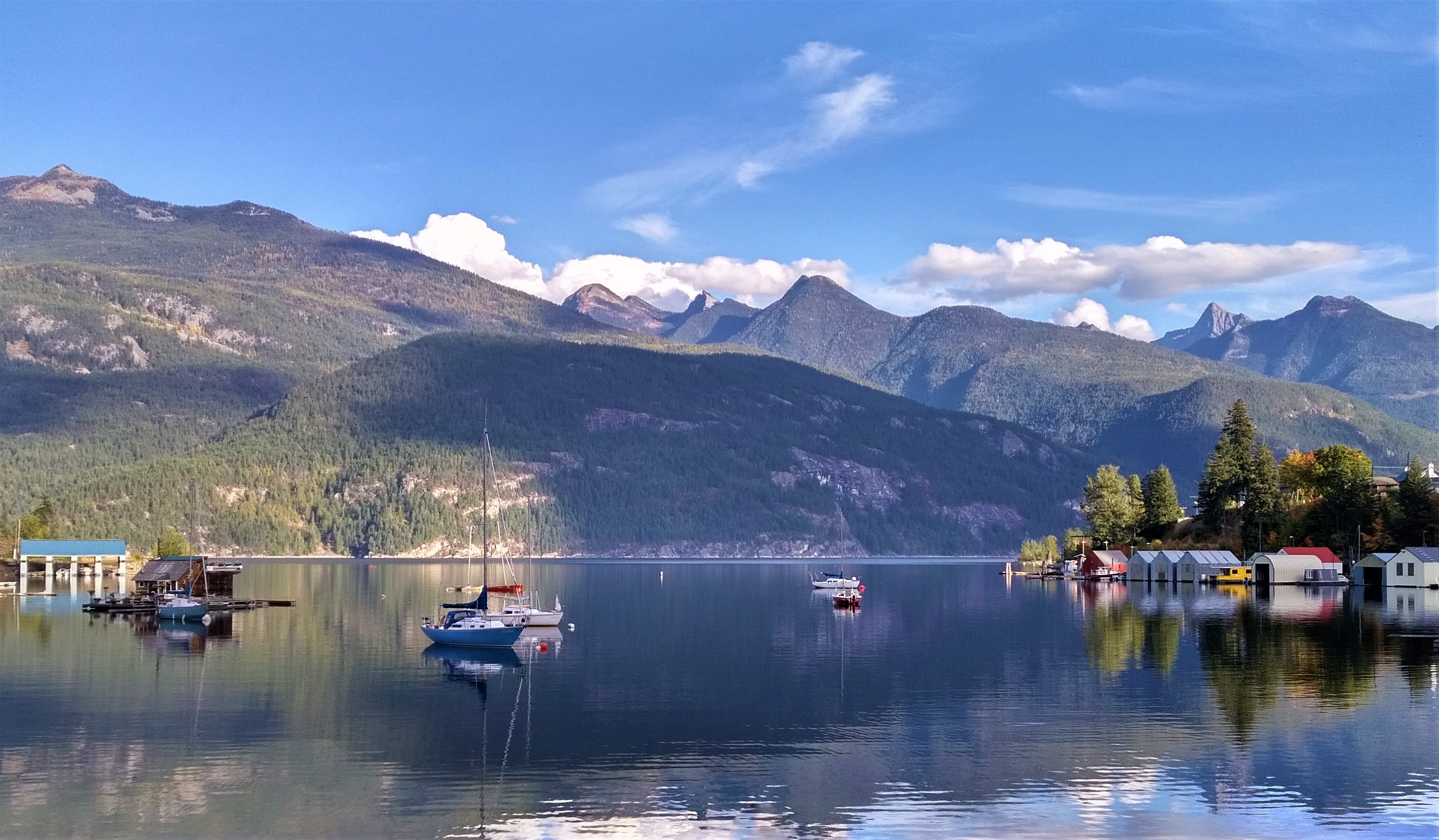
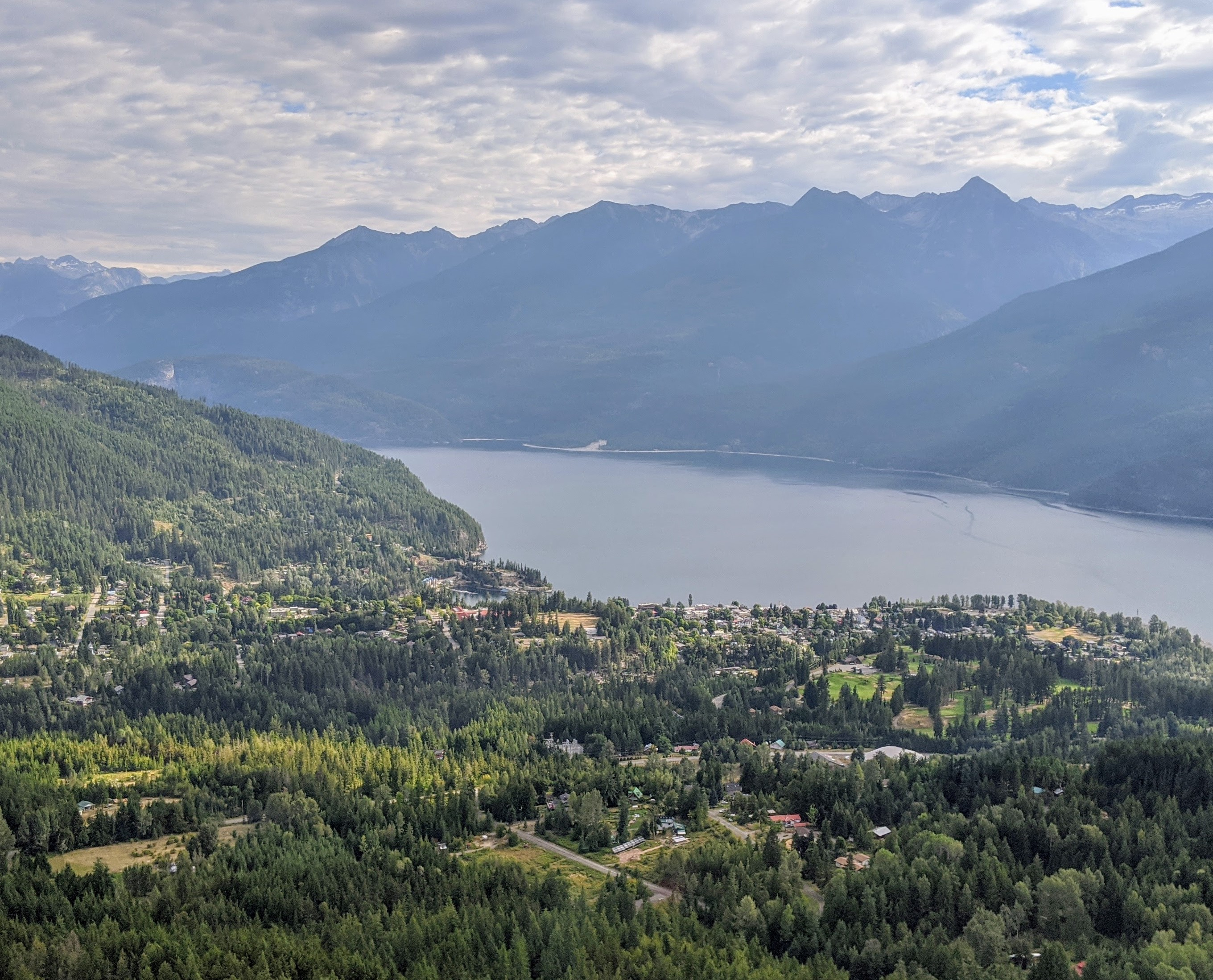
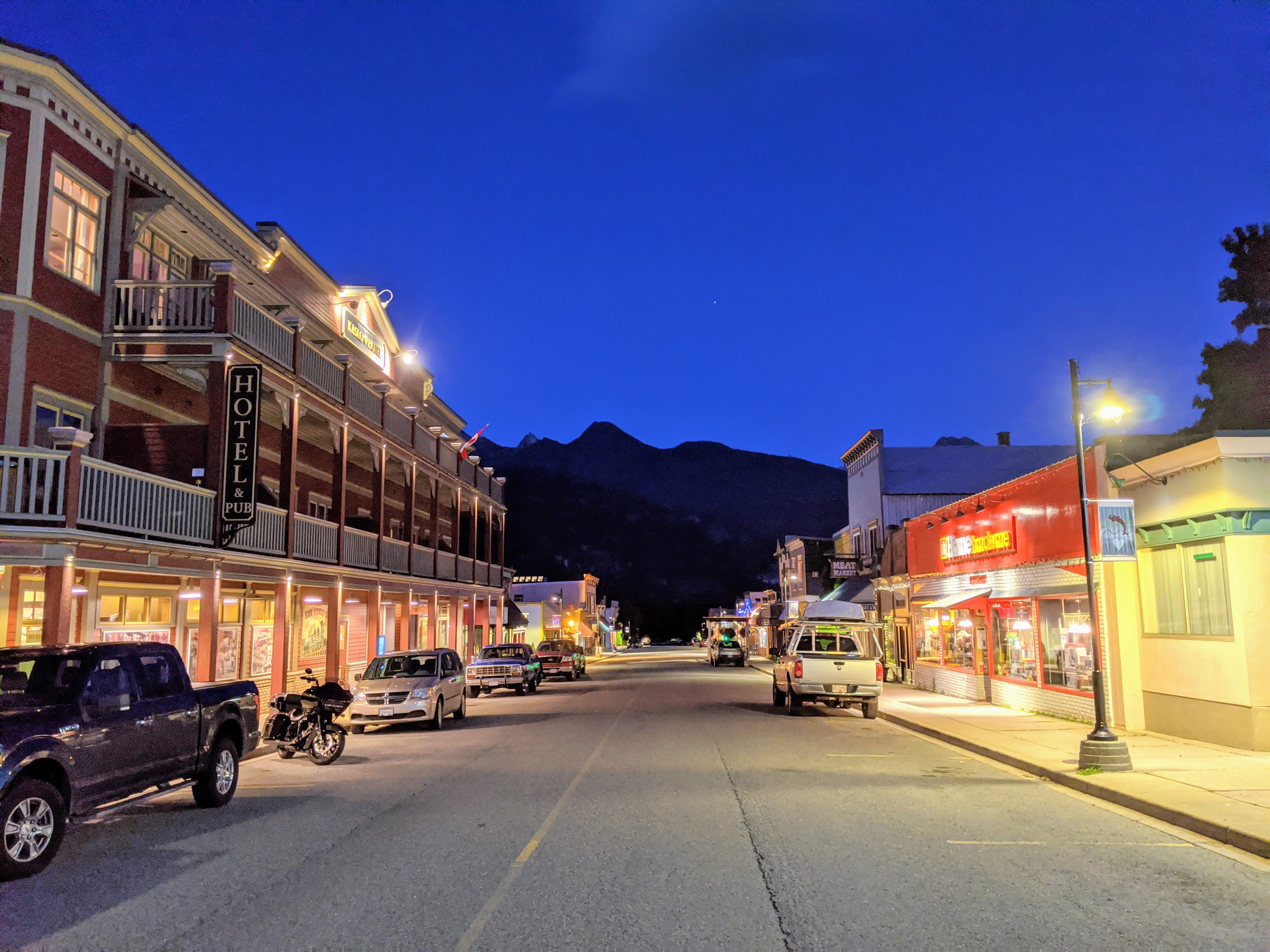
- Motto: Industry Progress Wealth
- Location of Kaslo in British Columbia Kaslo (Canada)
- Coordinates: 49°54′48″N 116°54′41″W
- Country: Canada
- Province: British Columbia
- Region: Kootenays
- Regional District: Central Kootenay

Government
  - Mayor: Erika Bird
  - Governing body: Kaslo Village Council: Molly Leathwood; Robert Lang; Erika Bird; Matthew Brown
  - MP: Rob Morrison (CPC)
  - MLA: Brittny Anderson (NDP)

Area
  - Land: 3.01 km^{2} (1.16 sq mi)
- Elevation: 591 m (1,939 ft)

Population (2021)
  - Total: 1,049
  - Density: 348.7/km^{2} (903/sq mi)
- Time zone: UTC−07:00 (PT)
- Postal code span: V0G 1M0
- Area code: 250 / 778 / 236
- Highways: Highway 31; Highway 31A
- Waterway: Kootenay Lake
- Website: kaslo.ca

Kaslo is a village on the west shore of Kootenay Lake in the West Kootenay region of southeastern British Columbia. A member municipality of the Central Kootenay Regional District, the name derives from the adjacent Kaslo River.

Before the arrival of Europeans, the area was home to the semi-nomadic Kutenai (Ktunaxa) and Lakes (Sinixt) tribes. Settlers came and used it as a sawmill site in 1889, but Kaslo soon expanded as a result of the silver boom of the late 19th century. It retains much of the historic atmosphere from its earlier mining days. The economy of Kaslo is now based mainly on the forestry and tourism industries.

== Mining ==
Kaslo was an important centre for shipping silver ore from mines in the area. In 1895, it became the eastern terminus for the Kaslo and Slocan Railway. Kaslo's fortunes faded after the end of the silver rush and the widespread collapse of mining activity following World War I, but the growth in fruit farming and logging partially offset the decline.

== Community ==
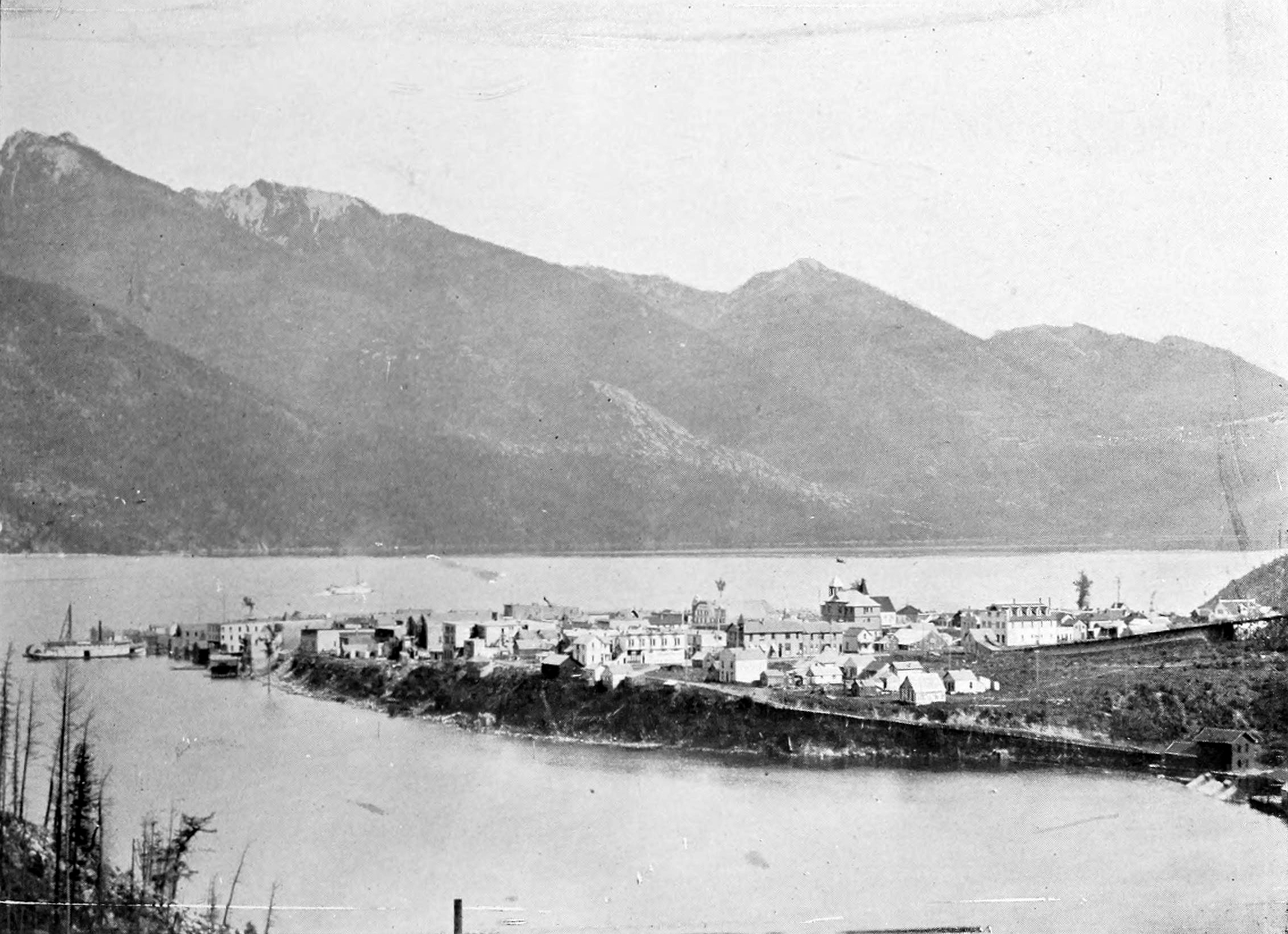
Kaslo, 1900

After the 1891 townsite survey, building lots were marketed. Kaslo was incorporated as a city on August 14, 1893, making it the oldest incorporated community in the Kootenays. Destroyed by the 1894 flood, the townsite was rebuilt. At the time, the population was about 3,000.

The Kaslo Kootenaian, a newspaper established in 1896, existed until 1969. The settlement was re-incorporated as a village on January 1, 1959.

== Modern Economy ==
Following the decline of mining in the early 20th century, Kaslo transitioned to a diversified economy based on forestry, tourism, small-scale agriculture, and outdoor recreation. Today, tourism and outdoor adventure sports are major drivers of the local economy, attracting visitors with Kaslo's historic atmosphere, natural beauty, and access to year-round activities.

Kaslo is recognized as a hub for backcountry skiing and catskiing, with pioneering operations such as Selkirk Snowcat Skiing, White Grizzly Cat Skiing, Retallack Lodge and Stellar Heliskiing operating nearby. Neighboring backcountry lodges, including Mount Carlyle Backcountry Lodge and Mount Brennan Off-Grid Backcountry Lodge, contribute to the region's reputation for alpine recreation. The Kaslo Outdoor Recreation and Trails Society maintains an extensive trail network for hiking, mountain biking, and cross-country skiing. Nearby provincial parks and the farming communities of Meadow Creek further support the regional economy.

Kaslo has also embraced growth in technology and innovation. The Kootenay Lake Innovation Centre, located in the historic Kemball Centre, provides coworking spaces and entrepreneurial support for remote workers, creatives, and small businesses. Artisan businesses such as Kaslo Sourdough reflect a focus on sustainable local food production.

== Demographics ==
In the 2021 Census of Population conducted by Statistics Canada, Kaslo had a population of 1,049 living in 526 of its 583 total private dwellings, a change of 8.4% from its 2016 population of 968. With a land area of 3.01 km^{2} (1.16 sq mi), it had a population density of 348.5/km^{2} (902.6/sq mi) in 2021.

== National historic Sites ==
Kaslo is home to two National Historic Sites of Canada:

- The SS Moyie, which worked on Kootenay Lake from 1889 to 1957, found a permanent home on Front Street in Kaslo. Restored by the Kootenay Lake Historical Society, it is the oldest intact sternwheeler in the world and draws thousands of visitors every year.
- The Village Hall, built in 1898, is one of only two intact wooden municipal buildings that are still in use in Canada.

== Attractions ==
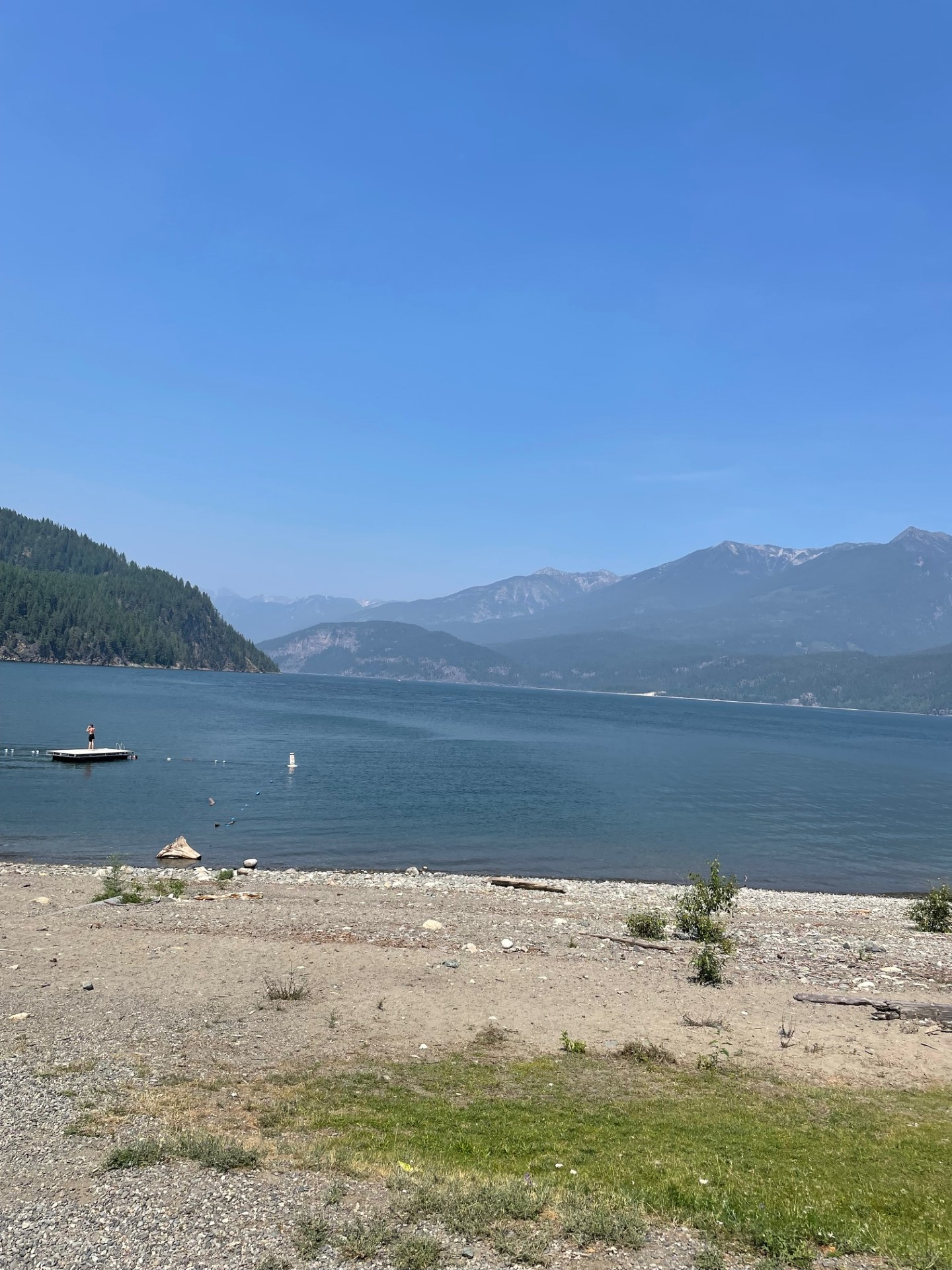
Kaslo Public Beach

- Many health and wellness facilities and professionals, including The Sentinel, as well as neighbouring Yasodhara Ashram and Ainsworth Hot Springs.
- The Kootenay Lake Innovation Centre is a non-profit that is fostering growth of creative events, civic engagement and technology development.
- The Langham, a former grand hotel was built in the mid 1890s, is now Langham Cultural Society, a charitable public arts heritage centre and Japanese Canadian Museum.
- The Kaslo Golf Club is a 9-hole course which plays as a 2,824-yard, men's par 35, women's par 37 course. Kaslo's Golf Club dates back to 1923, when locals invested and donated their efforts and created a 4-hole course. This makes it one of the oldest in British Columbia. A new timberframe clubhouse was built in 2007.
- The Kaslo Jazz Etc. Festival, held every August long weekend in Kaslo Bay Park, is a music event that attracts international performers and every weekend in the summer from June to September the community hosts the Kaslo Summer Music Series in various parks.

== Japanese internment ==
In 1941, Kaslo was selected as one of many sites throughout BC for the internment of Japanese Canadians. 964 Japanese Canadians were relocated to Kaslo in 1942, before being moved to New Denver in 1946.

== Television ==
Kaslo has been featured on the historical television series Gold Trails and Ghost Towns (season 2, episode 2). Kaslo was also featured in the 1995 film Magic in the Water, starring Mark Harmon and Joshua Jackson, as well as in Tougher Than It Looks, starring Glenn Erikson in 2017.

== Climate ==
Kaslo has a humid continental climate (Dfb) or an inland oceanic climate (Cfb) depending on the isotherm used.

Climate data for Kaslo
Month	Jan	Feb	Mar	Apr	May	Jun	Jul	Aug	Sep	Oct	Nov	Dec	Year
Record high °C (°F)	9.4 (48.9)	15.6 (60.1)	18.5 (65.3)	27.8 (82.0)	36.7 (98.1)	34.4 (93.9)	37.8 (100.0)	36.5 (97.7)	33.9 (93.0)	23.9 (75.0)	16.7 (62.1)	10.6 (51.1)	37.8 (100.0)
Mean daily maximum °C (°F)	0.8 (33.4)	3.2 (37.8)	8.0 (46.4)	13.5 (56.3)	18.3 (64.9)	21.6 (70.9)	25.4 (77.7)	25.4 (77.7)	19.7 (67.5)	12.0 (53.6)	4.7 (40.5)	0.4 (32.7)	12.7 (54.9)
Daily mean °C (°F)	−2.1 (28.2)	−0.6 (30.9)	3.4 (38.1)	7.6 (45.7)	12.0 (53.6)	15.4 (59.7)	18.5 (65.3)	18.3 (64.9)	13.5 (56.3)	7.4 (45.3)	1.7 (35.1)	−2.2 (28.0)	7.7 (45.9)
Mean daily minimum °C (°F)	−4.9 (23.2)	−4.3 (24.3)	−1.3 (29.7)	1.7 (35.1)	5.7 (42.3)	9.2 (48.6)	11.5 (52.7)	11.2 (52.2)	7.2 (45.0)	2.7 (36.9)	−1.3 (29.7)	−4.8 (23.4)	2.7 (36.9)
Record low °C (°F)	−27.2 (−17.0)	−26.1 (−15.0)	−21.7 (−7.1)	−12.8 (9.0)	−6.1 (21.0)	−0.6 (30.9)	2.8 (37.0)	2.2 (36.0)	−6.1 (21.0)	−10.6 (12.9)	−22 (−8)	−31.1 (−24.0)	−31.1 (−24.0)
Average precipitation mm (inches)	105.8 (4.17)	60.4 (2.38)	72.9 (2.87)	62.4 (2.46)	60.9 (2.40)	76.9 (3.03)	56.0 (2.20)	44.4 (1.75)	56.7 (2.23)	65.9 (2.59)	112.8 (4.44)	110.5 (4.35)	885.6 (34.87)
Average rainfall mm (inches)	46.7 (1.84)	39.3 (1.55)	60.6 (2.39)	60.7 (2.39)	60.9 (2.40)	76.9 (3.03)	56.0 (2.20)	44.4 (1.75)	56.7 (2.23)	65.6 (2.58)	85.5 (3.37)	44.8 (1.76)	698.0 (27.48)
Average snowfall cm (inches)	59.2 (23.3)	21.1 (8.3)	12.3 (4.8)	1.7 (0.7)	0.0 (0.0)	0.0 (0.0)	0.0 (0.0)	0.0 (0.0)	0.0 (0.0)	0.3 (0.1)	27.4 (10.8)	65.7 (25.9)	187.6 (73.9)

== Notable people ==
- Lieutenant Commander John Hamilton Stubbs, DSO, DSC, Royal Canadian Navy, was born at Kaslo on June 5, 1912. Best known as a destroyer captain, J.H. Stubbs commanded Assiniboine and Athabaskan on convoy escorts and actions in the English Channel, which included the sinking of U-210 in August, 1942. He was killed in action on 29 April 1944 off the coast of France when Athabaskan was sunk by a German torpedo.
- Jason "J" Remple (1971–2025) was born in Kaslo and became a pioneering backcountry ski guide and entrepreneur. He worked for over two decades at Selkirk Snowcat Skiing, one of the first catskiing operations in the world, before founding Stellar Heliskiing. In 2022, he and his wife purchased the historic Kaslo Hotel. Remple was a mentor in the Canadian Ski Guide Association and an active community volunteer, contributing to trail building, fire protection efforts, and Search and Rescue. He died while guiding near Kaslo in 2025.

== See also ==
- List of francophone communities in British Columbia
