= Willke =

Willke is a surname. Notable people with the surname include:

- Helmut Willke (born 1945), German sociologist
- John C. Willke (1925–2015), American physician, author, and anti-abortion activist

== See also ==
- Wilkie (disambiguation)
- Willkie
- Willikies
