= Alan Wilkie =

Alan Wilkie may refer to:

- Alan Wilkie (judge) (born 1947), British judge
- Alan Wilkie (referee) (born 1951), British football referee
- Alan Wilkie (weather presenter), (1928–2023), Australian meteorologist and television weather presenter

== See also ==
- Allan Wilkie (1878–1970), British actor
