= Comaplix, British Columbia =

Former mining town in British Columbia, Canada

Coordinates: 50°45′00″N 117°46′00″W

Comaplix was a former mining town on the Incomappleux River in the Upper Arrow Lake area of the West Kootenay region of British Columbia. The name of the town and an adjacent mountain and creek derived from the river. Cleared in 1896, the town was surveyed and a sawmill established the next year. The suspicious 1915 fire, which levelled the buildings, largely ended the flourishing hamlet. The site, north of Beaton, on the northeast side of the lake's Beaton Arm, comprised merely concrete foundations when the Keenleyside Dam reservoir submerged the area in 1968. The small overgrown cemetery above the townsite is all that remains.

== See also ==
- Arrowhead, British Columbia
- Steamboats of the Arrow Lakes
- Galena Bay
