= Lardeau River (British Columbia) =

River in southeastern British Columbia

- Location within British Columbia

Location
- Country: Canada
- Province: British Columbia
- District: Kootenay Land District

Physical characteristics
- Source
  - location: Trout Lake
- Mouth: Duncan River
  - coordinates: 50°14′34″N 116°57′23″W
- Length: 43 kilometres (27 mi)
- Discharge
  - location: above Kootenay Lake

The Lardeau River, which flows into the Duncan River, is in the West Kootenay region of southeastern British Columbia. The Selkirk Mountains lie to the west and the Purcell Mountains to the east.

== Name origin ==
Lardo and Lardeau were used interchangeably for decades before the latter spelling prevailed. The earliest reference to the river used Lardo in 1885, but the pass used Lardeau in 1889. Of the numerous theories, one is that early prospectors adopted Lardo to signify a rich or fat land, deriving from the vulgar meaning for a person who was a rich or fat prospect. Although the early French-speaking fur traders may have influenced the Lardeau spelling, the geographical word origin probably had more to do with lard or bacon.

== Course ==
The Lardeau is about 43 kilometres (27 mi) long, flowing southeasterly from the source at Trout Lake to the mouth at the Duncan River, about 13 kilometres (8 mi) upstream from Kootenay Lake. The upper 14 kilometres (9 mi) of the Lardeau comprises a series of riffle areas and deep, calm pools, where log jams are common. The bed varies from coarse sand to fine gravel to about 15-centimetre (6 in) diameter stones. Along the lower 24 kilometres (15 mi), several glacial streams increase volume, creating fewer pools and log jams. The bed is glacial silt. The warmer water temperatures of the upper river create the main spawning ground for Kootenay Lake trout, mostly between Trout Lake and Mobbs (Canyon) Creek.

== Railway ==
The Arrowhead and Kootenay Railway, a Canadian Pacific Railway (CP) subsidiary, was completed to the foot of Trout Lake in June 1902. The line paralleled and crossed the river at two points. However, the river continually undermined the rail bed and swollen creeks carried away bridges. Although heavy mining traffic never materialized, the railway was the primary means of communication and transportation along the valley for 40 years. Passenger service ended in the early 1930s. In 1942, CP abandoned the line and the rail bed was adapted to become a public highway.

== Ferries and road bridges ==
During 1899–1901, a ferry operated at Gold Hill and likely during the same period at the first crossing near Leblanc (Marblehead), where Alfred Leblanc operated the Ferry Hotel. By the early 1900s, a road or footbridge opened at Gold Hill.

In 1924, a two-span bridge was erected adjacent to the mouth of Healy Creek but was washed out during the spring high water. In 1950, a one-span bridge was built but existed briefly. Until the mid-1920s, a bridge existed well downstream over the Duncan River closer to the Duncan mouth. After its removal, a replacement was immediately sought to access the east side of the Duncan from Marblehead. Instead, the government built the Marblehead bridge across the Lardeau River in 1940, which followed the initial railway grade northeastward toward Howser. However, no approaches were added on either end for nine years. This prompted a demand in 1941 for a vehicle ferry on the lower Duncan River. After approaches were added in 1949, traffic included settlers, loggers, and access to the Duncan Dam. In 1970, the bridge was dismantled.

== Forestry ==
The Kootenay Cedar Co (KC) acquired the timber rights emanating from the land grants CP received in building the railway. Other large players had bought up the special timber licences issued 1905–1907, but most of these remained dormant and left to expire after World War I. Although the KC held tens of thousands of acres of logging rights along the line, the company did not log itself but sold these rights to contractors. The latter felled and sold the timber mainly to the large mills at Nelson. However, many small mills also operated throughout the valley. The cedar trees were ideal for telegraph poles. Logs could either be hauled to the railway line for transportation or driven downriver in spring. Most felling was in the winter. During the 1920s, logging was main industry of the valley.

== Discharge ==
Daily discharge tables 1917–2021.

== Lardeau Creek ==
From headwaters west of the midpoint of the Duncan River, the creek flows north, then west for about 32 kilometres (20 mi) before entering the head of Trout Lake. During the 1890s, mining references interchangeably used the name Lardo Creek or the Upper Lardeau River. Ferguson was a key mining centre on the waterway. Commercial placer mining occurred as late as 1939. The creek offers recreational panners acceptable returns.

== Maps ==
- "Perry's mining map". wwwdavidrumsey.com. 1893.
- "Lardeau map". geography.ua.edu. 1929.
- "Shell BC map". www.davidrumsey.com. 1956.

== See also ==
- List of rivers of British Columbia
