= Philip Willkie =

American politician (1919–1974)

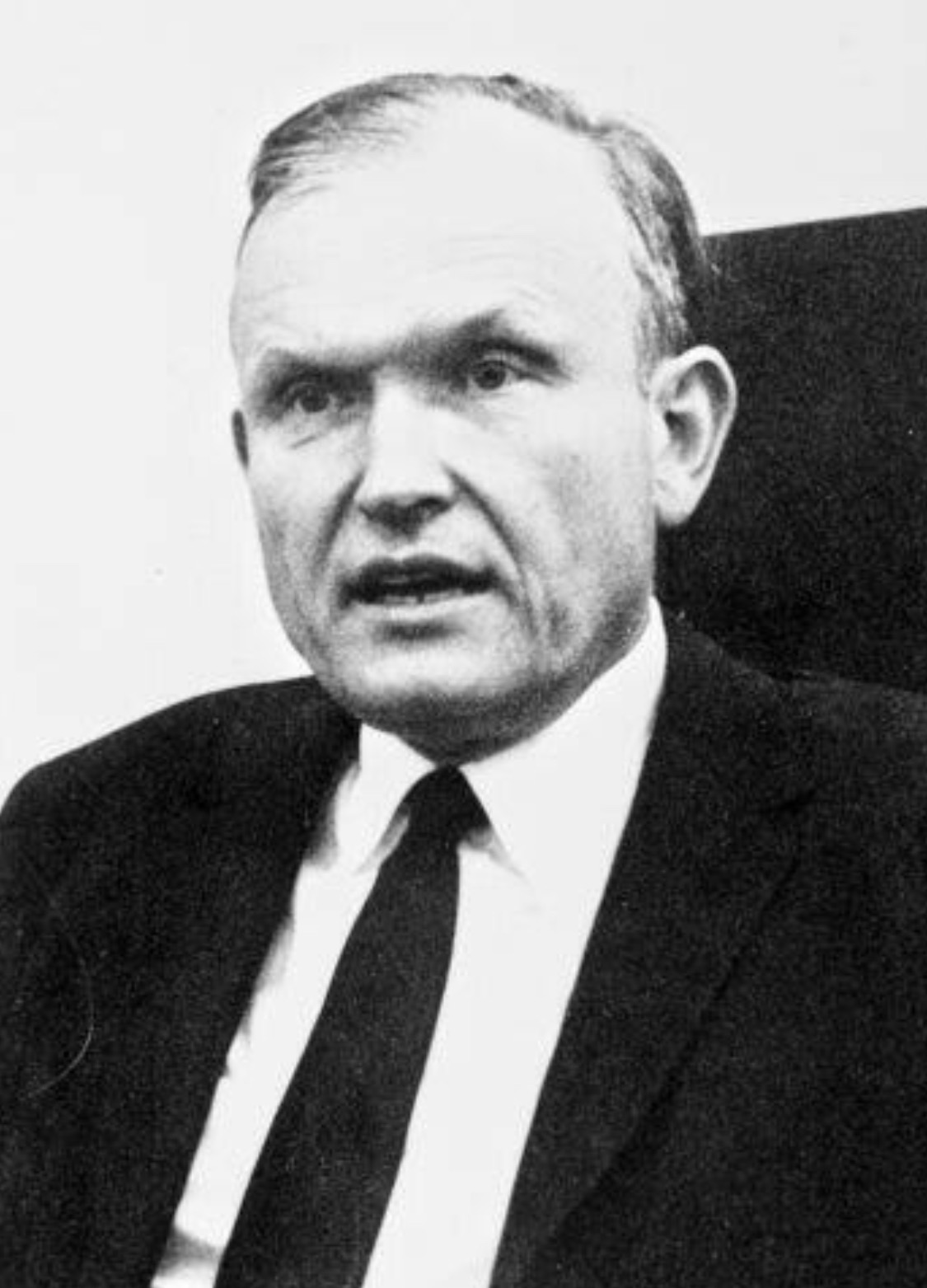

Member of the Indiana House of Representatives from the Henry and Rush County district
- In office November 3, 1948 – November 3, 1954
- Preceded by: Raymond Charles Morgan
- Succeeded by: Vance Manifold Waggoner

Personal details
- Born: Philip Herman Willkie; December 7, 1919 Rushville, Indiana, US
- Died: April 10, 1974 (aged 54) Rushville, Indiana, US
- Party: Republican
- Spouses: Rosalie Heffelfinger (m. 1950; div. 1962); Virginia Isabell (m. 1965)
- Children: 5
- Parent: Wendell Willkie (father)
- Education: Princeton University (AB); Harvard University (AM); Columbia University (LLB)
- Occupation: Lawyer, politician

Military service
- Allegiance: United States
- Branch/service: United States Navy
- Years of service: 1941–1945
- Battles/wars: World War II

Philip Herman Willkie (December 7, 1919 – April 10, 1974) was an American lawyer and politician. He was the only child of Wendell Willkie. A Republican, he was a member of the Indiana House of Representatives.

== Biography ==
Willkie was born on December 7, 1919, in Rushville, Indiana. He was educated at Harvard University, Columbia University and Princeton University. He also graduated from the American Bankers Association Stonier Graduate School of Banking. During World War II, he served as a lieutenant in the United States Navy and was second in command under Commander Weems.

Willkie was president of the Rushville National Bank in Rushville, Indiana, a farmer and cattleman, and a businessman who served on several corporate boards. He was for three two-year terms a member of the Indiana House of Representatives from 1949 to 1955. In 1960, Willkie ran for Indiana Superintendent of Public Instruction, but lost to the incumbent, William Earl Wilson by 0.87%.

Willkie supported allowing foreign-trained doctors the ability to practice in small-town America. He also advocated the preservation of the independence of small-town banking.

Willkie's professional and social associations included Beta Theta Pi fraternity, the Masonic lodge, Moose International, Benevolent and Protective Order of Elks, Press Club, and the Columbia Club of Indianapolis. He was an admitted to the bar in New York, Washington D.C., and Indiana.

Willkie married Rosalie Heffelfinger in 1950 and divorced in 1962; they had three sons. He married Virginia Isabell in 1965, and they had two sons.

Willkie committed suicide on April 10, 1974, aged 54, in Rushville. News reports indicated that his suicide followed the early stages of an investigation of the Rushville National Bank by federal regulators. The bank was shut down by the Office of the Comptroller of the Currency in 1992 as insolvent.

Party political offices
Preceded by Wilbur E. Young	Republican nominee for Indiana Superintendent of Public Instruction; 1960	Succeeded by Alvin C. Cast
