= British Columbia Highway 31 =

Highway in British Columbia, Canada

Highway 31
- Balfour-Kaslo-Galena Bay Highway

Route information
- Maintained by the Ministry of Transportation and Infrastructure
- Existed: 1973–present

Major junctions
- South end: Highway 3A in Balfour
- Highway 31A in Kaslo
- North end: Highway 23 in Galena Bay

Highway 31
- Length: 175 km (109 mi)

Location
- Country: Canada
- Province: British Columbia

Highway system
- British Columbia provincial highways
← Highway 30	→ Highway 33

Highway 31 is a minor north–south highway through the Selkirk Mountains in British Columbia, Canada. The highway first gained its number in 1973, and it is one of the few numbered highways in the province that is not fully paved. Highway 31 has a total distance of 175 km (109 mi) — 37 km (23 mi) along Kootenay Lake between Balfour (a junction with Highway 3A) and Kaslo (a junction with Highway 31A), 106 km (66 mi) north along Kootenay Lake north of Kaslo, then the Duncan and Lardeau Rivers and the north shore of Trout Lake, and 32 km (20 mi) between the northwest end of Trout Lake and Galena Bay, where it ends at Highway 23.

The highway is a gravel road between Meadow Creek at the north end of Kootenay Lake and Trout Lake. Care should be taken when driving the route as it is narrow and has drop offs into Trout Lake north of Gerrard.

The section between Lardeau and Gerrard was possibly a part of a railway. The railway was converted into a highway in 1942 or early 1943 as part of a rail-to-road conversion project. The work took only two months to complete.

== Major intersections ==
Regional District	Location	km	mi	Destinations	Notes
Central Kootenay	Balfour	0.00	0.00	Highway 3A – Nelson, Kootenay Lake Ferry, Creston	Highway 31 southern terminus
Central Kootenay	Ainsworth Hot Springs	14.49	9.00		
Central Kootenay	Kaslo	35.79	22.24	Highway 31A west – New Denver	
Columbia-Shuswap	Galena Bay	175.37	108.97	Highway 23 – Nakusp, Shelter Bay Ferry, Revelstoke	Highway 31 northern terminus
1.000 mi = 1.609 km; 1.000 km = 0.621 mi

== Highway 31A ==
- Highway 31A
- Length: 47 km (29 mi)
- West end: Highway 6 in New Denver
- East end: Highway 31 in Kaslo

Highway 31's main spur, Highway 31A, which also opened in 1973, is 47 km (29 mi) long, connecting Highway 31 at Kaslo to Highway 6 at New Denver.

=== Major intersections ===
The entire route is in Central Kootenay Regional District.

Location	km	mi	Destinations	Notes
New Denver	0.00	0.00	Highway 6 – Nelson, Vernon, Nakusp	Highway 31A eastern terminus
Kaslo	46.50	28.89	Highway 31 – Nelson, Meadow Creek, Trout Lake	Highway 31A wastern terminus
1.000 mi = 1.609 km; 1.000 km = 0.621 mi
