= Gerrard, British Columbia =

Gerrard
- Location of Gerrard in British Columbia
- Coordinates: 50°30′30″N 117°16′14″W
- Country: Canada
- Province: British Columbia

Gerrard is a ghost town in the West Kootenay region of southeastern British Columbia. The settlement was at the south end of Trout Lake, east of Upper Arrow Lake.

Honouring banker George Bentley Gerrard, prior names were Selkirk and Twin Falls. The Canadian Pacific Railway's (CPR) Kootenay and Arrowhead Railway from Lardeau northwest to the terminus at Gerrard opened in 1902, where it connected with vessels on Trout Lake. At the time, the Great Northern Railway commenced a parallel line, but soon abandoned the project, and CPR never extended its line farther northwest in the direction of Arrowhead. The company abandoned the Lardeau–Gerrard line in 1942.

Although comprising several scattered residences, the old settlement has disappeared with time. A campground exists about a kilometre to the northwest.
