= Beaton, British Columbia =

Beaton
- Location of Beaton in British Columbia
- Coordinates: 50°44′00″N 117°44′00″W
- Country: Canada
- Province: British Columbia
- Elevation: 482 m (1,581 ft)

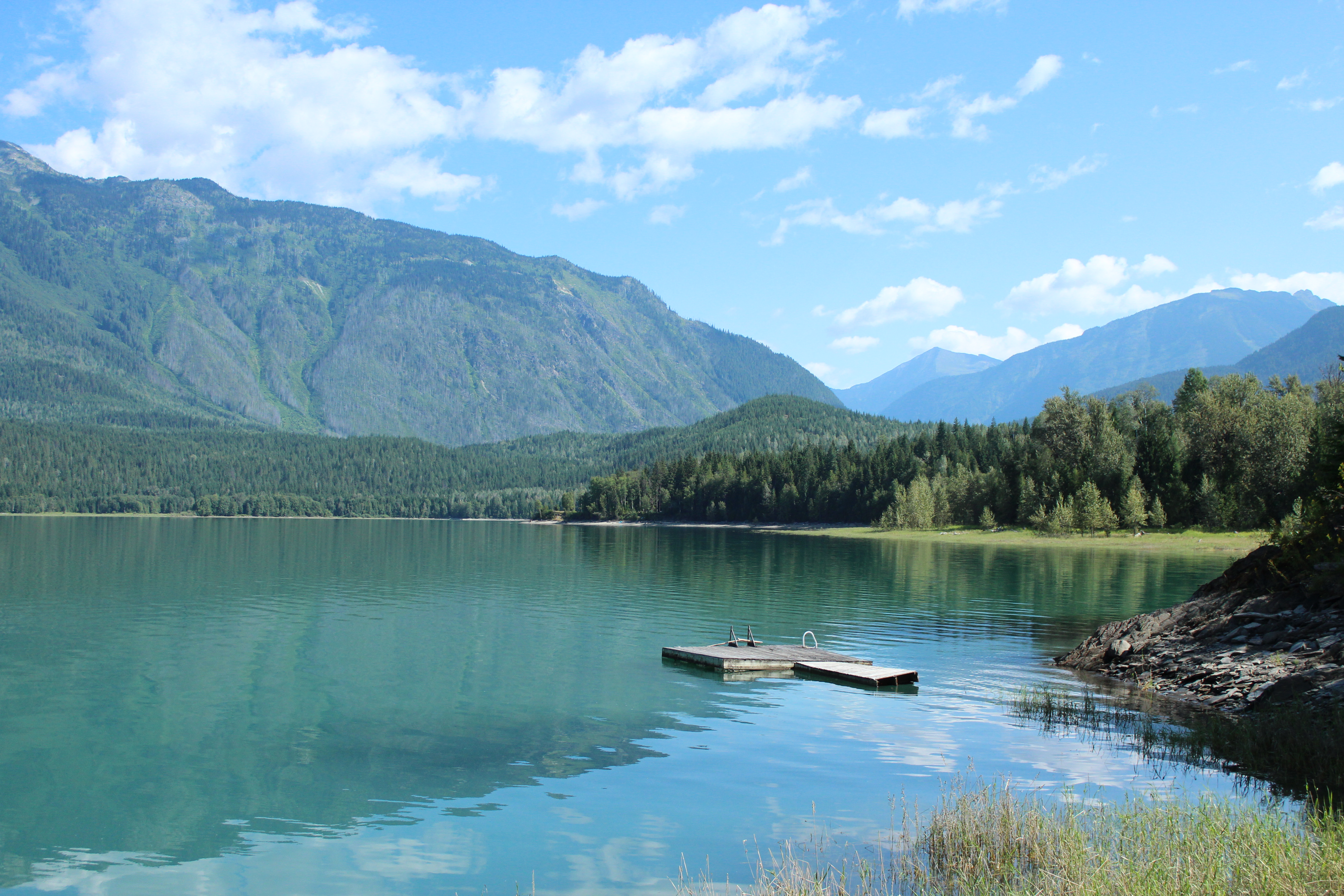
Photo of the Beaton Arm in August 2020.

Beaton is at the head of the Beaton Arm of Upper Arrow Lake in the West Kootenay region of southeastern British Columbia. The locality is sometimes confused with nearby Evansport.

In 1896, the steamboat landing became the eastern terminal for the Arrowhead–Beaton ferry. Formerly Thomson's Landing, it was named after the land owner, James William Thomson, who was the local notary public in 1901. Thomson's subsequent partner was Malcolm Beaton, sometimes confused with Donald J. Beaton, publisher of the Nelson Miner in Nelson. In 1902, the name changed to Beaton, because of destination confusions for mail and freight arising from the prior name. There were 65 residents in 1911. Other towns in the vicinity included Comaplix, Camborne, Galena Bay and Arrowhead.

In 1957, the eastern terminal for the ferry moved to Galena Bay. As BC Hydro was flooding the new reservoir in 1967–1969, the hotel burned to the ground (a catastrophe that coincidentally occurred to several other hotels up and down the lake around that time). The post office closed in 1969. Although comprising several scattered residences, the former settlement was mostly covered by the reservoir and never rebuilt.

== See also ==
- Steamboats of the Arrow Lakes
- List of ghost towns in British Columbia
