= Lardeau =

- Location of Lardeau in British Columbia
- Coordinates: 50°09′00″N 116°57′00″W
- Country: Canada
- Province: British Columbia
- Area codes: 250, 778

Lardeau is an unincorporated community, and former mining town and steamboat landing. The settlement is on the west shore near the head of Kootenay Lake in the West Kootenay region of southeastern British Columbia.

Lardo and Lardeau were used interchangeably for decades before the latter spelling for the settlement prevailed. The earliest reference to the river used Lardo in 1885, but the pass used Lardeau in 1889. This likely reflects the distinction evident by the 1890s that Kootenay Lake settlers preferred Lardo, but those closer to Upper Arrow Lake were more accustomed to Lardeau. Of the numerous theories, one is that early prospectors adopted Lardo to signify a rich or fat land, deriving from the vulgar meaning for a person who was a rich or fat prospect. Although the latter common usage apparently developed later, the root meaning had existed for centuries. The Lardeau spelling suggests a French influence, but the geographical word origin probably had more to do with lard or bacon.

By 1892, a Lardeau existed on the northeast arm of Upper Arrow Lake, and plans were promoted to build a railway line to connect Lardo and Lardeau. In 1893, the land registry initially refused to accept the Lardo townsite plan, because the name was too similar to Lardeau. A war of words erupted between the much larger Lardo and the tiny Lardeau. By 1896, the latter site was abandoned and the buildings moved to nearby Comaplix. In reality, most residents of the Upper Arrow Lake area would have preferred their part of the valley not be called the Lardeau mining district.

In 1902, the Geographic Board of Canada approved the uniform spelling of Lardo as Lardeau. The mining boom soon ended, followed by a widespread collapse of mining activity after World War I. The name of the Lardo post office, opened in 1899, did not change to Lardeau until 1947. Lardeau today is one of the small communities in the area catering to the tourism industry. The valley comprises mixed farming and logging.
