= List of rapids of the Columbia River =

This is a list of rapids of the Columbia River, listed in upriver order. The river flows through Canada and the United States. Almost all of these rapids are now submerged in the reservoirs of dams. The list is not exhaustive; there were numerous minor rapids and riffles, many of which were never named.

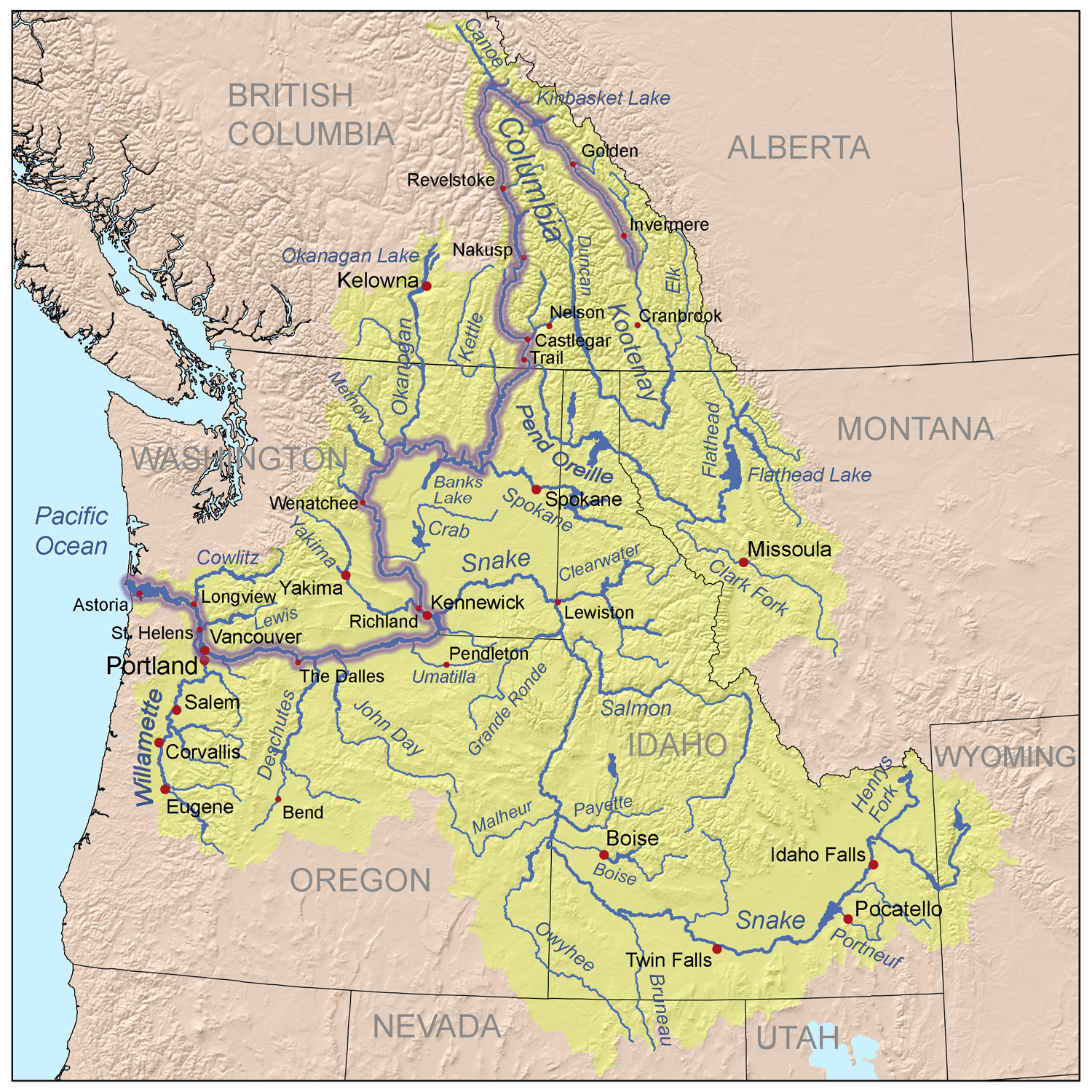
Map of the Columbia drainage Basin with the Columbia River highlighted and showing the major tributaries

== Mouth to Snake River ==
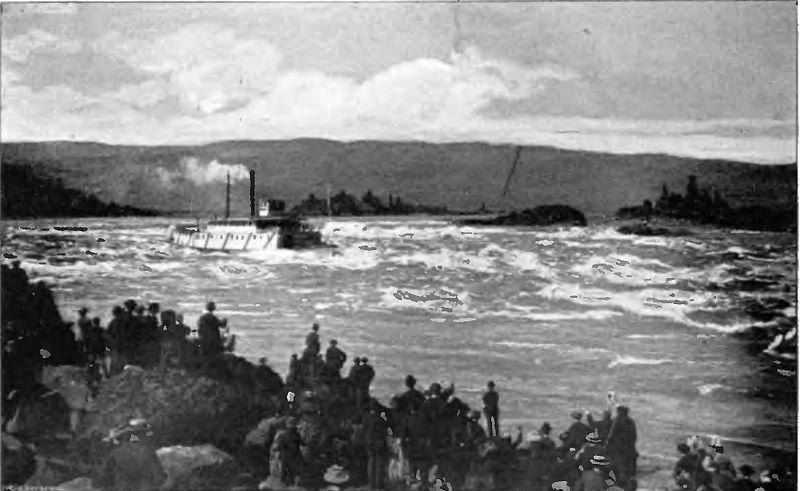
Cascade Rapids.

- Cascade Rapids (The Cascades, Grand Rapids, Cascade Falls, Cascades of the Columbia): Located at river mile 146.5 near today's Bonneville Dam in the Columbia River Gorge; at 45°38′34″N 121°56′4″W. The river fell about 40 feet (12 m) over approximately 2 miles (3.2 km), through a channel about 150 yards (140 m) wide. Submerged in 1937 under Lake Bonneville, the reservoir of Bonneville Dam. See also Bridge of the Gods, Cascade Locks and Canal, Greenleaf Peak, and Table Mountain.

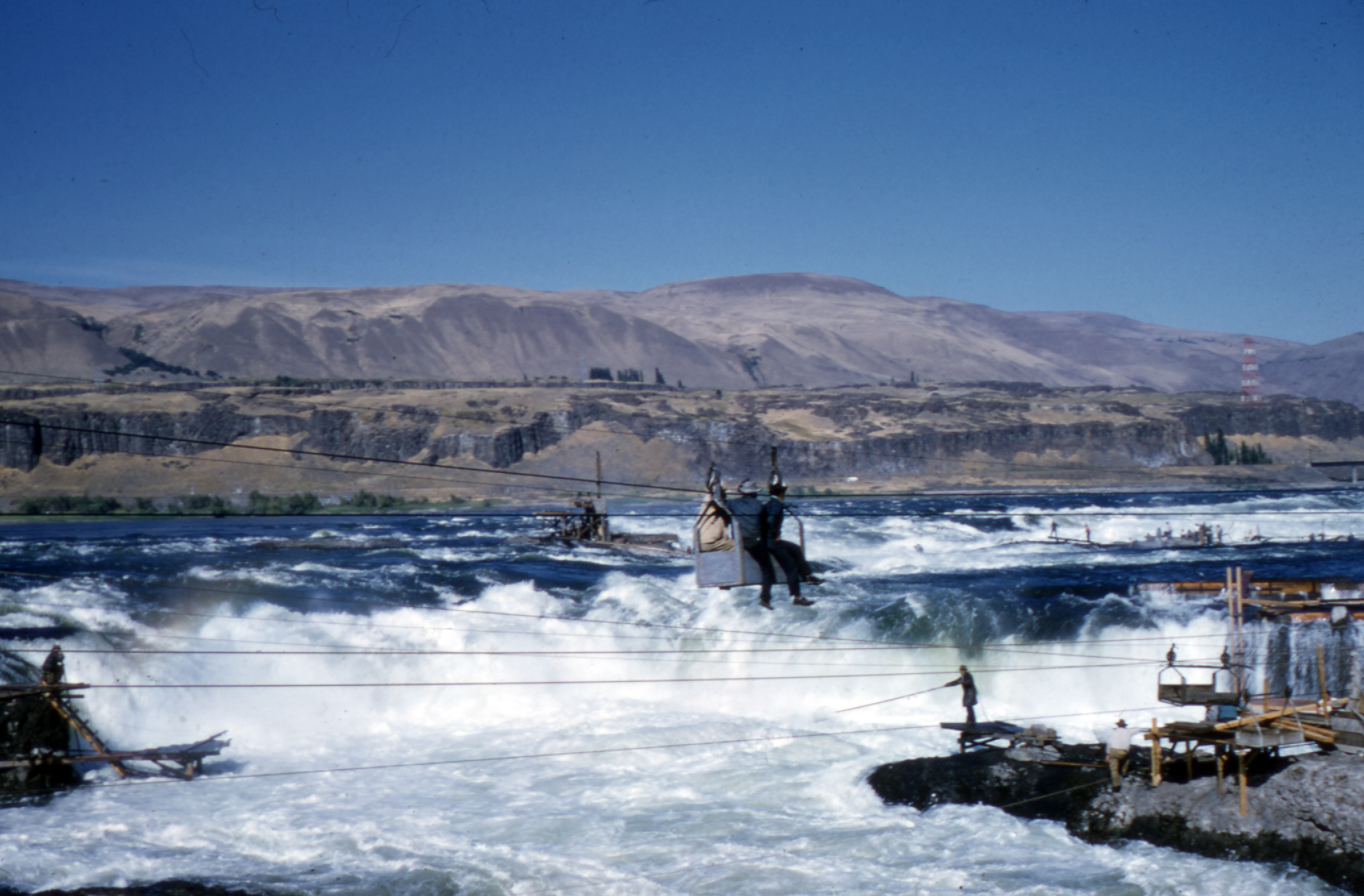
Celilo Falls.

- Celilo Falls and The Dalles (many variant names including: The Chutes, Columbia Falls, Great Falls of the Columbia, Five Mile Rapids, Long Narrows, Les Grand Dalles de la Columbia, The Dalles of the Columbia): A series of rapids located between river mile 188 and 200 near today's The Dalles, Oregon in the Columbia River Gorge. The entire set of rapids was known by various names such as The Dalles and The Narrows. The river fell about 81 feet (25 m) over approximately 12 miles (19 km), through a channel that narrowed to 75 feet (23 m) wide in one section. Rapids and falls within the series included (in order upriver): Threemile Rapids, 45°36′29″N 121°8′44″W, The Dalles Rapids (not to be confused with the whole series of rapids), 45°37′44″N 121°6′49″W; Fivemile Rapids, 45°37′49″N 121°6′29″W; Tenmile Rapids, 45°39′1″N 121°2′19″W;, and Celilo Falls, 45°38′59″N 120°58′44″W;. Except for Threemile Rapids, the entire series of rapids was submerged in 1957 under Lake Celilo, the reservoir of The Dalles Dam. Threemile Rapids is just below the dam, at the upper end of Lake Bonneville, the reservoir of Bonneville Dam. See also Celilo Canal, Celilo Village, Oregon, and Wishram village.
- Preachers Eddy: Located at river mile 214, 45°42′14″N 120°43′24″W, near Rufus, Oregon.
- Schofield Rapids: Located at river mile 215, just below today's John Day Dam; at 45°42′39″N 120°42′4″W. It was small and not a significant hazard. It was submerged in 1957 by the uppermost waters of Lake Celilo, the reservoir of The Dalles Dam.
- John Day Rapids: Located between river mile 216 and 218, near the mouth of the John Day River and consisting of two main rapids: the Lower John Day Rapids, at 45°42′59″N 120°41′9″W, and the Upper John Day Rapids, at 45°44′9″N 120°39′24″W. The Army Corps of Engineers made efforts to improve navigation at the rapids. In 1911 a "large reef" was removed from the "middle rapids". The rapids were submerged in 1971 under Lake Umatilla, the reservoir of John Day Dam.
- Indian Rapids: Located at river mile 220, just above the mouth of the John Day River, at 45°44′34″N 120°37′4″W. It was small and not a significant hazard. When David Thompson visited the rapids on August 2, 1811, he named it Muscle Rapids due to the many shells he found there. The rapids were submerged in 1971 under Lake Umatilla, the reservoir of John Day Dam.
- Squally Hook Rapids: Located at river mile 223, a few miles above the mouth of the John Day River, at 45°43′54″N 120°33′19″W. It was not a major hazard although one commentator described it as "short sharp and savage". In 1912 the Army Corps of Engineers improved navigation by drilling and blasting rocks at the rapids. The rapids were submerged in 1971 under Lake Umatilla, the reservoir of John Day Dam.
- Rock Creek Rapids: Located near the mouth of Rock Creek, approximately river mile 227 to 228. Described as "rough and rowdy" but not particularly hazardous.
- Blalock Rapids: A very minor rapid, probably located near the railway siding of Blalock at the mouth of Blalock Canyon, approximate river mile 233. It was submerged in 1971 under Lake Umatilla, the reservoir of John Day Dam.
- Owyhee Rapids: A very minor rapid located at river mile 240, 45°43′24″N 120°13′59″W, near Arlington, Oregon. It was submerged in 1971 under Lake Umatilla, the reservoir of John Day Dam.
- Canoe Encampment Rapids: A minor rapid located at river mile 265.5, 45°50′47″N 119°46′34″W, about 3 miles (4.8 km) below Boardman, Oregon. In 1912 the Army Corps of Engineers improved navigation at the rapids by removing "two large reefs" and several smaller ones from the center of the channel, which had been a hazard during low-water. The rapids were submerged in 1971 under Lake Umatilla, the reservoir of John Day Dam.
- Umatilla Rapids: A significant rapid, located at what is now McNary Dam, river mile 292, 45°56′17″N 119°18′9″W. There were at least three "riffles", with the third one downstream being the main one. The total length was somewhat over 1.5 miles (2.4 km). During the low-water seasons, about November to March, Umatilla Rapids became a barrier to steamboat navigation in the late 19th century. The lesser rapids below Umatilla also became more hazardous; larger boats might not even be able to reach Umatilla Rapids during low-water. During high-water large boats could operate from Celilo Falls upriver as far as Lewiston, Idaho on the Snake River. The low-water season effectively suspended river navigation above Umatilla Rapids and on the Snake River. In 1912 the Army Corps of Engineers described the Upper Umatilla Rapids as having two channels. The north channel, known as the low-water channel, was "narrow and tortuous at low water, but has been the only available channel". The south channel, known as the high-water channel, was used only during the high and medium stages of the river. In 1891 rocks were blasted in Umatilla Rapids to create a passage for steamboats during low water. Additional work to improve navigation was done in 1910 and 1911. The rapids were submerged in 1954 under Lake Wallula, the reservoir of McNary Dam. Parts of the dam were built on top of the lower portion of the rapids. In 1805 the Lewis and Clark Expedition gave the name Musselshell Rapids due to the numerous mussels.
- Homley Rapids (Homly Rapids): A very minor rapid located about 7 miles (11 km) below Pasco, Washington. In 1911 the Army Corps of Engineers described "Homly Rapids" as "the shoalest on the Columbia between Celilo and the mouth of the Snake River", and that the river was divided by numerous islands, with the main channel passing between "islands Nos. 4 and 5". The Corps made efforts to improve navigation by removing obstructions from the main channel and by building "wing dams" to force more water into the main channel. The rapids were submerged in 1954 under Lake Wallula, the reservoir of McNary Dam.
- Bull Run Rapids: A very minor rapid located a few miles below Wallula Gap.

== Snake River to Bridgeport ==
The 70 mile stretch between Priest Rapids and the mouth of the Snake River (the Hanford Reach) "has the slowest current of any part of the Columbia above The Dalles".

- Coyote Rapids: A minor rapid located at river mile 382, 46°38′57″N 119°37′8″W, next to the "100 Area" of the Hanford Site, which is home to Hanford's B Reactor (now a National Historic Landmark) and N-Reactor, and others including the C, D, DR, KE, and KW reactors. As part of the Hanford Reach of the Columbia, Coyote Rapids still exist.

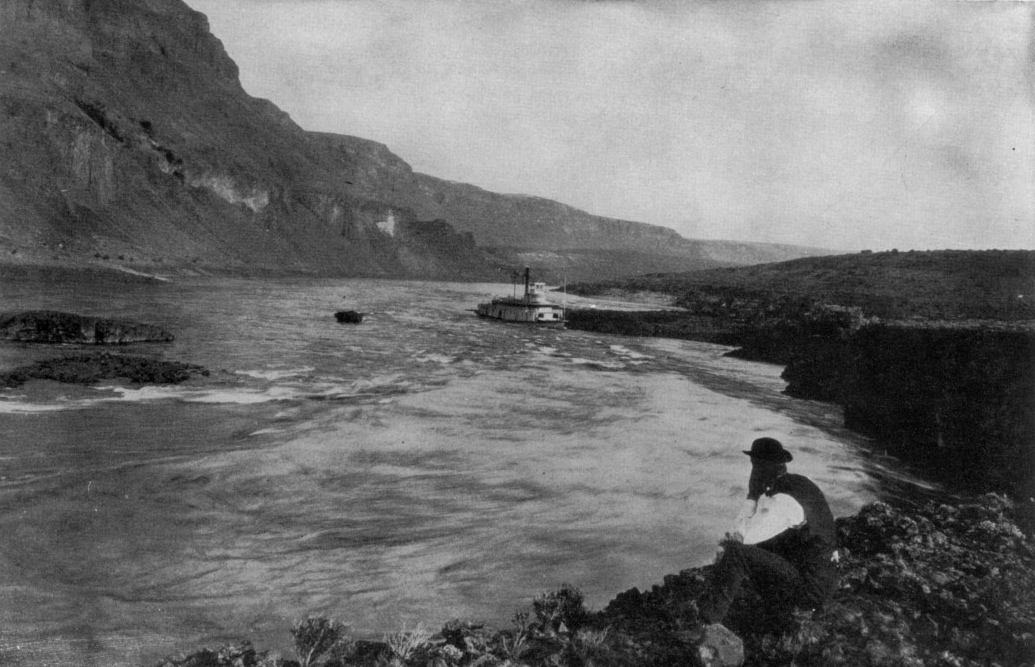
Priest Rapids.

- Priest Rapids: A series of seven rapids located approximately between river mile 406 and 397 (an 1893 report says river miles 409.5 to 421), near Mattawa, Desert Aire, and the Yakima Training Center. The USGS provides a single coordinate point, 46°45′17″N 119°58′20″W. The river dropped 72 feet (22 m) over the entire 9 miles (14 km) length, with a drop of 20 feet (6.1 m) occurring in one short section. In 1888 two steamboats were built at Pasco specifically for the purpose of making it through Priest Rapids and Rock Island Rapids to Wenatchee. The first of the two failed. The second, smaller one, City of Ellensburg, under Captain William Polk Gray, succeeded in passing through Priest Rapids and the more difficult Rock Island Rapids. Later, the sister boat, Thomas L. Nixon, also succeeded in ascending both rapids and reaching Wenatchee. In 1959 the rapids were submerged under Priest Rapids Lake, the reservoir of Priest Rapids Dam.
- Cabinet Rapids: Located at river mile 448, at the mouth of Moses Coulee, 47°16′17″N 120°5′29″W. The river fell about 10 feet (3.0 m) over a length of about 8,000 feet (2,400 m). In 1963 the rapids were submerged under Lake Wanapum, the reservoir of Wanapum Dam.
- Nixon Rapids: Located at river mile 451.5, a few miles below Rock Island Dam; 47°19′12″N 120°5′19″W. The rapids are submerged in Lake Wanapum, the reservoir of Wanapum Dam.
- Rock Island Rapids: Located at approximately river mile 454, near Rock Island Dam and Rock Island, and a few miles upriver from Cabinet Rapids; 47°20′39″N 120°5′52″W. The rapids were over 2 miles (3.2 km) long. Local native people called them Squah-ah-shee. They were given their present name in 1881 by Lieutenant Thomas W. Symons, who named them for Rock Island, a large rock in the river below Wenatchee, around which the water flowed swift and roughly. The two channels around Rock Island were full of rocks and other obstructions, and there was a "great reef" a short distance above the head of the island, with large bars of gravel, "nearly choking the channel at low water". The river fell 10 feet (3.0 m) over a distance of 3,000 feet (910 m) at low-water. In 1933 the rapids were submerged in Rock Island Pool, the reservoir of Rock Island Dam. At least two steamboats were wrecked at the rapids. The Selkirk wrecked at Rock Island Rapids on May 15, 1906 (see Shipwrecks of the inland Columbia River). In 1887 a steamboat tried and failed to ascend the Rock Island Rapids. In 1888 two steamboats were built at Pasco specifically for the purpose of making it through Priest Rapids and Rock Island Rapids to Wenatchee. The first of the two failed. The second, smaller one, City of Ellensburg, under Captain William Polk Gray, succeeded in passing through Priest Rapids and the more difficult Rock Island Rapids. Later, the sister boat, Thomas L. Nixon, also succeeded in ascending both rapids and reaching Wenatchee.
- Entiat Rapids: Located between the mouth of the Entiat River and Orondo, at approximately 47°39′30″N 120°13′0″W. The rapids are submerged in Lake Entiat, the reservoir of Rocky Reach Dam.
- Methow Rapids: Located at river mile 523, at the mouth of the Methow River near Pateros; 48°2′37″N 119°53′30″W. In 1967 the rapids were submerged in Lake Pateros, the reservoir of Wells Dam.

== Bridgeport to Canada–US border ==
The portion of the river between Monaghan Rapids and Foster Creek Rapids was regarded as particularly hazardous. An 1893 report by the Army Corps of Engineers described the river from Monaghan Rapids to the foot of Foster Creek Rapids as "very swift and studded with rocks, and taken all in all will be found an extremely hard and dangerous if not absolutely impassable portion of the river to navigate". Over the 45 miles (72 km) from Monaghan to Foster Creek the river fell 171 feet (52 m) at low-water. Over the 10 miles (16 km) between Mah-kin Rapids and a point three miles below Parson Rapids the river fell 41 feet (12 m) at low water. The portion from White Cap Rapids to Eagle Rapids was once known as "Nespilem Canyon". The Corps' 1893 report said that over the worst 3 miles (4.8 km) stretch the river fell 22 feet (6.7 m) at low-water and 24 feet (7.3 m) at high-water, and that the speed of the current at low-water was about 10 miles per hour (16 km/h). On the possibility of navigation the Corps was pessimistic: "The fall of the river here is so great that it is certain that no system of rock removal could make the river sufficiently navigable to justify the danger and risk necessarily incurred in running boats on it."

- Reef Rapids: Located at river mile 544, between Bridgeport and Chief Joseph Dam; 48°0′10″N 119°39′27″W. It was submerged in 1967 by Lake Pateros, the reservoir of Wells Dam.
- Foster Creek Rapids: Located at river mile 547–546, just above Chief Joseph Dam and Bridgeport. About a mile long, the rapids are submerged in Rufus Woods Lake, the reservoir of Chief Joseph Dam. An 1893 report by the United States War Department described Foster Creek Rapids as "among the worst rapids on the river", and being about 3 miles (4.8 km) long, including Reef Rapids. Over this length the river fell 21 feet (6.4 m) during low water and 24 feet (7.3 m) at high water. In 1911 and 1912 efforts were made by the Army Corps of Engineers to improve navigation by blasting submerged rocks and reefs from Reef Rapids through Foster Creek Rapids and upriver to "Kalichen Rock" (Eagle Rapids).
- Eagle Rapids (also called Whirlpool Rapids and Kalichen Falls): Located at river mile 555, just below Box Canyon; 48°4′49″N 119°29′26″W. Submerged in Rufus Woods Lake, the reservoir of Chief Joseph Dam.

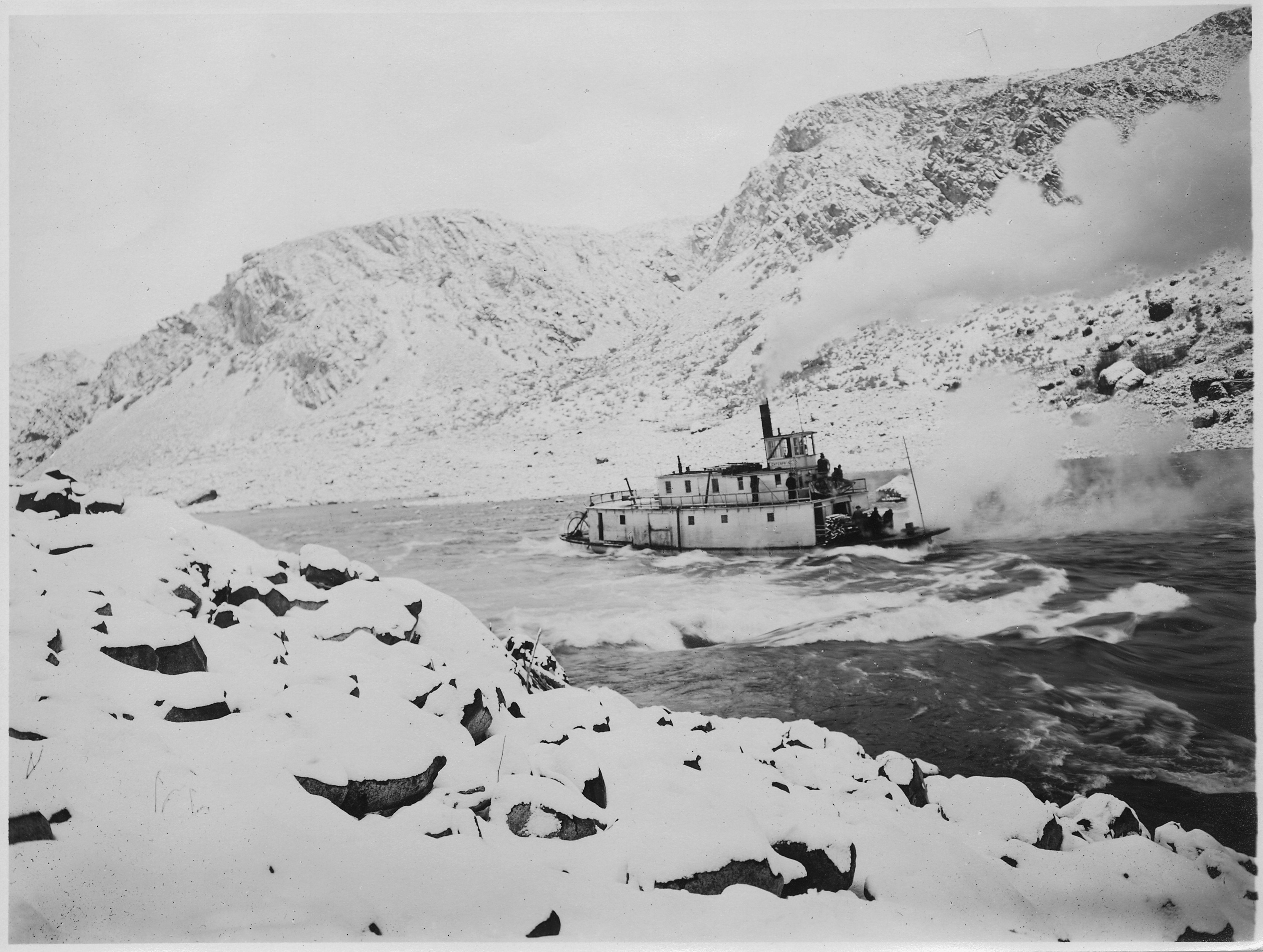
Upper Long Rapids.

- Long Rapids: Located at river mile 557, just above Box Canyon; 48°4′43″N 119°26′40″W. Submerged in Rufus Woods Lake, the reservoir of Chief Joseph Dam.
- White Cap Rapids: Located at river mile 558.5, between Gaviota Bend and Box Canyon; 48°3′50″N 119°25′29″W. Submerged in Rufus Woods Lake, the reservoir of Chief Joseph Dam. Lewis R. Freeman described White Cap Rapids as a narrow, straight, and steep channel "heavily littered with boulders and fanged with outcropping bedrock", with a "mad tumble of wallowing waters", somewhat similar to Gordon Rapids in the Big Bend region, but rougher.
- Parson Rapids: Located at river mile 566, at Tombstone Rocks, a few miles below Goose Flats; 48°5′54″N 119°19′33″W. Submerged in Rufus Woods Lake, the reservoir of Chief Joseph Dam.
- Granite Rapids: Located at river mile 570, south of Saddle Horse Flat; 48°6′11″N 119°15′43″W. Submerged in Rufus Woods Lake, the reservoir of Chief Joseph Dam.
- Mah-kin Rapids (also Mahkin): Located at river mile 572.5, at the head of Nespelem Canyon;48°6′59″N 119°13′1″W. Submerged in Rufus Woods Lake, the reservoir of Chief Joseph Dam.
- Nespelem Rapids: Located at river mile 582.5, just above the mouth of the Nespelem River; 48°7′15″N 119°2′12″W. Submerged in Rufus Woods Lake, the reservoir of Chief Joseph Dam.
- Equilibrium Rapids (Jumbo Rapids): Located at river mile 584.5, at Bailey Basin; 48°5′37″N 119°1′22″W. Submerged in Rufus Woods Lake, the reservoir of Chief Joseph Dam. The name "equilibrium" was given by Symons because there was a rock in the rapids that rolled back and forth in the current.
- Monaghan Rapids (Moneghan's Rapids, Buckley's Rapids): Located at river mile 587, just below an island called Buckley Bar.; 48°4′0″N 119°0′55″W. The name was given in 1881 by Lieutenant Thomas W. Symons, in honor of James Monaghan, who had encountered difficulties at the rapids in 1879-1880 attempting to bring rafts of supplies downriver to a military camp on the Okanogan River. Submerged in Rufus Woods Lake, the reservoir of Chief Joseph Dam.
- Hell Gate: A gorge and rapids located at river mile 619, at the mouth of Hell Gate Canyon, 23 miles (37 km) upriver of Grand Coulee Dam; 47°56′13″N 118°36′14″W. Hellgate Island is located in Hell Gate Canyon. The rapids were submerged in 1942 under Franklin D. Roosevelt Lake, the reservoir of Grand Coulee Dam.
- Spokane Rapids: Located at the mouth of the Spokane River, at Columbia river mile 640. Submerged in 1942 under Franklin D. Roosevelt Lake, the reservoir of Grand Coulee Dam.
- Turtle Rapids: A minor rapid located approximately at river mile 670, near Bissell, above Stray Dog Canyon. The name comes from a number of rock outcroppings that resembled turtle backs.
- Rickey Rapids (also called Grand Rapids): These fairly hazardous rapids were located at river mile 697, 3 miles (4.8 km) south of the Colville River and Kettle Falls; 48°32′37″N 118°8′34″W. The rapids were dangerous enough that even small craft typically portaged around them. In 1826 they were given the name "Thompson Rapids" by David Douglas in honor of David Thompson of the North West Company. The name "Rickey" was given by John Rickey, a man who operated a store near the rapids. The name "Grand Rapids was commonly used as late as 1882. Today the rapids are submerged in Franklin D. Roosevelt Lake, the reservoir of Grand Coulee Dam.

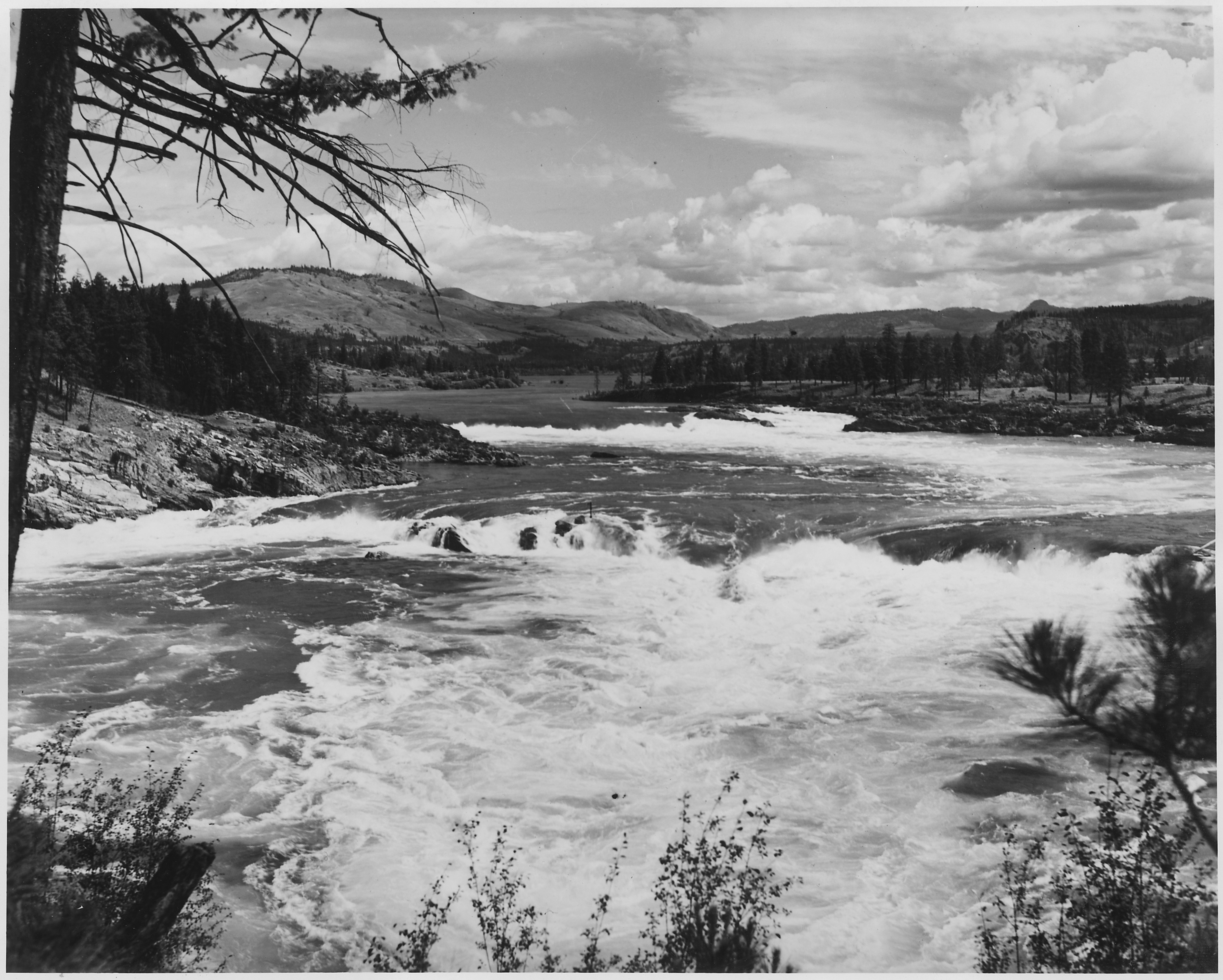
Kettle Falls.

- Kettle Falls: Located at river mile 704.5, about two miles below the mouth of the Kettle River and five miles above the mouth of the Colville River, near the city of Kettle Falls; 48°38′22″N 118°6′34″W. Submerged in Franklin D. Roosevelt Lake, the reservoir of Grand Coulee Dam.
- Little Dalles: Located at river mile 729, six miles downriver of Northport; 48°52′18″N 117°52′9″W. The river narrowed to 130 feet (40 m) at the head of the Little Dalles, then widened somewhat over a length of at least 2,000 feet (610 m). Boat navigation through the Little Dalles was not difficult at low water, but during the high water season the drop increased to 20 feet (6.1 m), making it a major hazard. The Little Dalles presented the primary obstacle to navigation on the upper river into Canada. The river was constricted between massive stone cliffs. The first official use of the name "Little Dalles" appears to come from the 1881 report of Lieutenant Symons, although it is likely the name was informally used long before. In an 1893 report Symons described the Little Dalles at low-water as "placid", but at high-water as "a seething, whirling torrent, impelled forward by a 16-foot head". He recommended ways to improve navigation during low-water. To improve navigation during high-water would require extensive work and would still be hazardous. He wrote, "Trees and logs 60 or 70 feet in length disappear in Little Dalles at high water; they go right down on end and do not reappear". In 1942 the rapids were submerged in Franklin D. Roosevelt Lake, the reservoir of Grand Coulee Dam.
- Pingstone Rapids: Located 9 miles (14 km) above the mouth of the Kettle River, at approximately 48°43′30″N 118°3′0″W. The rapids are submerged in Franklin D. Roosevelt Lake, the reservoir of Grand Coulee Dam.

== Canada–US border to Revelstoke ==
- Waterloo Eddy: An eddy located at the mouth of Cai Creek, about 4 kilometres (2.5 mi) south of the Castlegar Airport, near Waterloo Road; 49°16′00″N 117°39′00″W.
- Kootenay Rapids (formerly called Tincup Rapids or Tin Cups): A minor rapid located 0.5 miles (0.80 km) below Tincup Rapids, near Castlegar, just below the mouth of the Kootenay River. About 0.25 miles (0.40 km) long, the rapids are mild.
- Tincup Rapids (formerly called Kootenay Rapids): A pair of rapids, called Upper and Lower, or Big and Little Tincup Rapids, located at Castlegar, just above the mouth of the Kootenay River; 49°19′N 117°39′W. The river narrows to 201 metres (659 ft) at the foot of the lower rapid. For steamboats, the rapids were a navigation hazard during low water in autumn and winter. In the 1890s efforts were made to improve the channel by blasting rocks in the river. The rapids were noted as a "strong rapid" by David Thompson in his journal entry of September 6, 1811. During the 19th century Tincup Rapids was called Kootenay Rapids, and what is today called Kootenay Rapids was called Tincup Rapids. Sometime before 1916 the nomenclature was reversed.
- The Narrows: Located between Upper Arrow Lake and Lower Arrow Lake, where the Columbia's water flowed swiftly as a river for about 14 miles (23 km); centered at 50°04′N 117°54′W. The lower, southern end of The Narrows, where the river emptied into Lower Arrow Lake, was located at Burton near Cariboo Creek, 49°59′N 117°55′W. The upper, northern end, where Upper Arrow Lake emptied into The Narrows, was located at West Demars near McDonald Creek, 50°09′N 117°48′W. The name of the lakes comes from "Arrow Rock", a pinnacle located along The Narrows. After the Hugh Keenleyside Dam was built in 1968 the two Arrow Lakes merged and The Narrows were submerged.

== Revelstoke to Mica Dam ==
- Big Eddy: A whirlpool located at the sharp river bend just above downtown Revelstoke. 51°0′12″N 118°14′11″W The locality of Revelstoke was first known as "The Eddy" because of a large swirl in the river which had eroded the right bank of the Columbia here.
- Steamboat Rapids: Located just north of downtown Revelstoke, about 4 kilometres (2.5 mi) below Revelstoke Dam; 51°1′15″N 118°13′2″W.
- Little Dalles Canyon: Located just north of Revelstoke; 51°3′N 118°11′W. Revelstoke Dam and the southern end of its reservoir Lake Revelstoke are in the canyon. The name "dalles" implies a rapids.
- Eighteen Mile Rapids: Located near the mouth of Park Creek, about 8 kilometres (5.0 mi) downriver of Downie Creek, 51°23′N 118°25′W; or according to Department of Lands topographic maps pre-dating Revelstoke Dam, near the mouth of Big Eddy Creek on the west and Mars Creek on the east, 51°20′20.9″N 118°22′10″W. The rapids were submerged by Lake Revelstoke.
- Priest Rapids: Located just south (downriver) from Dalles des Morts and about 5 kilometres (3.1 mi) north (upriver) of the mouth of Downie Creek; 51°29′43.5″N 118°29′44.1″W. The rapids were submerged in Lake Revelstoke in 1984. The name comes from the drowning deaths of two French-Canadian priests at the rapids. Priest Rapids was reputed to be the fastest rapids of the Columbia River, with a current reckoned to be over 20 miles per hour (32 km/h).
- Dalles des Morts (Death Rapids): One of the most hazardous rapids of the Columbia River, located just above Priest Rapids and about 6 kilometres (3.7 mi) north of the mouth of Downie Creek; 51°30′40.6″N 118°30′34.3″W. The name dates to 1817 when seven voyageurs wrecked at the rapids and tried to walk to Spokane House, over 300 miles (480 km) away. Only one survived. A number of other fatal accidents occurred at the rapids, including the drowning of twelve people in 1838. Today the rapids are submerged in Lake Revelstoke, the reservoir of Revelstoke Dam.
- Rock Slide Rapids: Located about 1 mile (1.6 km) downriver of the foot of Twelve Mile Rapids. Lewis Freeman described Rock Slide Rapids as the narrowest point of the entire Columbia River below Windermere Lake, with a channel width averaging 70 feet (21 m). The river rushed through the narrows and poured into a "cauldron-like eddy", then into another narrow chute to form the Dalles des Morts. Today the rapids are submerged in Lake Revelstoke, the reservoir of Revelstoke Dam.
- Twelve Mile Rapids: Located just upriver of Dalles des Morts, 51°31′15.5″N 118°30′52.8″W. The rapids were submerged by Lake Revelstoke.
- Gordon Rapids: Located at the mouth of Ruddock Creek (formerly Gordon Creek), about 2 kilometres (1.2 mi) south of Horne Creek; approximately 10 kilometres (6.2 mi) above the mouth of the Goldstream River, 30 kilometres (19 mi) upriver from Dalles des Morts, and 40 kilometres (25 mi) below Mica Dam; 51°45′N 118°40′W. The rapids were submerged by Lake Revelstoke.

== Mica Dam to source at Columbia Lake ==
- Twenty-One-Mile Rapids: Lewis Freeman used the name Twenty-One-Mile Rapids for the series of rapids between the outlet of Kinbasket Lake (before its enlargement by Mica Dam) to the mouth of the Canoe River, which was about 21 miles (34 km) in length. Twenty-One-Mile Rapids in this sense included Redrock Canyon Rapids, Yellow Creek Rapids, Weasel Rapids, Mink Rapids, and Boulder Rapids. He also speculated that Twenty-One-Mile Rapids was "one of the longest, if not the longest, successfion of practically unbroken riffles on any of the great rivers of the world. Over the first 16 miles (26 km) the tail of one rapids generally ran right into the head of the next. The final 5 miles (8.0 km) contained less white water but still had a rapid current with many swirls and whirlpools. Throughout the series of rapids the river was closely constrained by canyons with no camping places along the way, thus one was compelled to run through the whole series in a single day. Lewis Freeman, in his 1921 account, reports a new, powerful rapid at the end of Twenty-One-Mile Rapids. His guide, Blackmore, claimed there had previously been no major rapid between Yellow Creek and Death Rapids, and that this new rapid had been created by a large landslide during the spring before their journey. Freeman describes this new rapids as located directly upriver from "Red Canyon".
- Redrock Canyon Rapids: Located near Redrock Harbour near the northernmost Big Bend of the Columbia River, southeast of Wood River, about 5 kilometres (3.1 mi) downriver from Yellow Creek, and approximately 10 kilometres (6.2 mi) upriver from Mica Dam; 52°5′28.2″N 118°22′27.9″W. Submerged in Kinbasket Lake.
- Yellow Creek Rapids: Located near Yellow Bay, the mouth of Yellow Creek, Wood River, approximately 15 kilometres (9.3 mi) upriver from Mica Dam; 52°4′N 118°20′W. Submerged in Kinbasket Lake.
- Weasel Rapids: Located just south of the mouth of Yellow Creek, approximately 20 kilometres (12 mi) upriver from Mica Dam; 52°4′N 118°19′W. Submerged in Kinbasket Lake.
- Mink Rapids: Located near the mouth of Three Minute Creek, about 3 kilometres (1.9 mi) below (northwest of) the Cummins River and approximately 25 kilometres (16 mi) upriver from Mica Dam; 52°3′N 118°17′W. Submerged in Kinbasket Lake.
- Boulder Rapids: Located about 3 kilometres (1.9 mi) above the Cummins River and approximately 25 kilometres (16 mi) upriver from Mica Dam; 52°0′30″N 118°10′0″W. Submerged in Kinbasket Lake.
- Surprise Rapids: Located just northwest of the Bush River, at the north end of a large island in a wide portion of Kinbasket Lake and just south of a narrow channel called The Elbow; approximately 15 kilometres (9.3 mi) northeast of Mount Sir Sandford and 70 kilometres (43 mi) upriver from Mica Dam; 51°46′31.2″N 117°41′8″W. The river fell about 100 feet (30 m) over approximately 3.33 miles (5.36 km). Within that length there were at least three cascades. The first cascade was the largest, with a drop of 21 feet (6.4 m) over 750 feet (230 m). At the second cascade the river dropped 15 feet (4.6 m) over 1,200 feet (370 m). At the third the drop was 25 feet (7.6 m) over 2,500 feet (760 m). In 1973 the rapids were submerged in Kinbasket Lake, the reservoir of Mica Dam.
- Brinkmans Terror Rapids: Located at the mouth of the Beaver River, approximately 16 kilometres (9.9 mi) downriver from Donald, British Columbia; 51°32′N 117°25′W. Submerged in the Columbia Reach of Kinbasket Lake, the reservoir of Mica Dam.
- Kitchins Rapids: Located at the upper end of Kinbasket Lake, near Redgrave, slightly above the mouth of Wiseman Creek; 51°31′N 117°19′W (or, according to topographic maps, 51°30′34.3″N 117°17′40.7″W). Submerged in the Columbia Reach of Kinbasket Lake, the reservoir of Mica Dam.

== See also ==
- Baillie-Grohman Canal
- Steamboats of the Arrow Lakes
- Steamboats of the Columbia River
- Steamboats of the Columbia River, Wenatchee Reach
- Shipwrecks of the inland Columbia River
- York Factory Express
