= Downie Creek (Columbia River tributary) =

- Location within British Columbia

Location
- Country: Canada
- Province: British Columbia
- Region: West Kootenay
- Regional district: Columbia-Shuswap

Physical characteristics
- Source
  - location: Muloch Cluster
- Mouth: Columbia River
  - coordinates: 51°30′06″N 118°22′18″W

Downie Creek is in the West Kootenay region of southeastern British Columbia, Canada. Surrounded by the Selkirk Mountains, the creek is a tributary of Lake Revelstoke, part of the Columbia River. On BC Highway 23, the highway bridge is by road about 69 kilometres (43 mi) north of Revelstoke.

== Creek profile ==
The creek valley is about 32 kilometres (20 mi) long and 800 to 1,600 metres (0.5 to 1.0 mi) wide. From headwaters in the Muloch Cluster, the river flows northwestward to its mouth.

Significant tributaries are Granite Creek, Boulder Creek, Long Creek, Standard Creek, Sorcerer Creek, Murder Creek, Pelkey Creek, Pass Creek, and Tumbledown Creek.

In the late 1970s, the inverted stratigraphy of the limestone was mapped over the 20 kilometres (12 mi) between Mt. Anstey and Carnes Peak, which encompasses the headwaters of the creek.

In fall 1984, flooding of the Revelstoke Dam reservoir began, which would submerge the former creek mouth and community. The gradual creation of the 8-kilometre (5 mi) arm eroded some of the sandy and silty material making up the creek banks.

== Name origin ==
In 1865, four boatloads of prospectors left Marcus, Washington bound for the Big Bend Country. William Downie was one of the party leaders. During the Big Bend Gold Rush, steamboats ran from Little Dalles to Downie Creek or LaPorte. At the time, about a thousand miners camped at the creek. The earliest known documented mention of the name Downie's Creek is 1866 and Downie Creek is 1884.

== River trails, roads, and boats ==
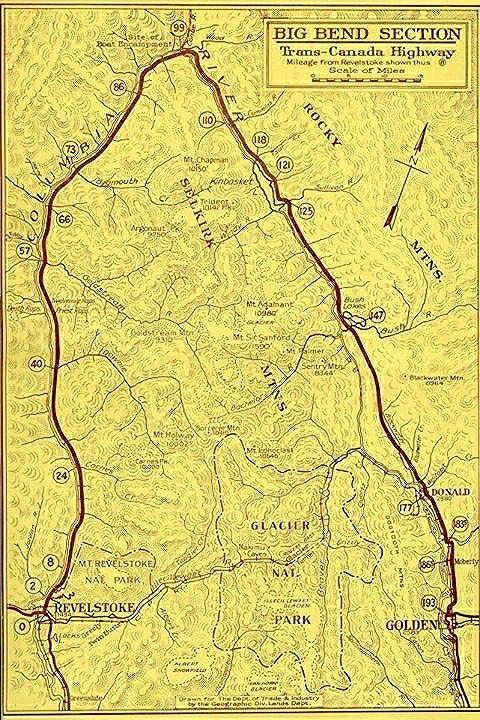
Big Bend Highway, 1940.

Following the goldrush, nature would have quickly reclaimed any trail south of the creek mouth. However, a trail remained north of the creek, making the creek a suitable base for the Gold commissioner. By the mid-1880s, upgrading this trail to a wagon road was under consideration.

South of the creek, only a rough trail extending 13 kilometres (8 mi) north of Revelstoke existed by 1891. When warranted, freight was carried by boat from Revelstoke and reloaded at the creek for the northward leg using George LaForme's pack train, which operated 1889–1905. By the mid-1890s, a pack train trail ran from Revelstoke to the creek. The S.S. Revelstoke operated the Revelstoke–Downie Creek run from 1902 during the summer months. By 1908, Five-Mile Landing was the departure point, while Downie Creek remained the northern terminus until 1915.

In 1913, a wagon road was built northward to the Goldstream River.

The gravelled Big Bend Highway northward from Revelstoke reached the creek in 1930 and the Goldstream River in 1931. Downie Creek was one of the few places along this highway where a break in the trees provided views of the mountains and the Columbia, which was 150 metres (500 ft) across at this location.

During 1979, tenders were called for reconstructing 95 kilometres (59 mi) of the 140-kilometre (87 mi) Revelstoke–Mica Creek highway at a higher elevation than the planned reservoir.

== Bridges and ferries ==
To access the northward trail along the Columbia, a bridge spanned the creek from at least the mid-1880s. When high water destroyed this structure in 1888, a rough boat for ferrying was temporarily installed. The next year, a new 67-metre (220 ft) bridge was erected.

In 1890, the bridge was again replaced, but a heavy snowfall during the 1891–92 winter destroyed the structure, requiring a rebuild of the 16-metre (54 ft) span and 8-metre (26 ft) approach the following summer. In 1894, the bridge washed out twice. During the intervening months, a ferry was used. The temporary bridge erected was 549 metres (600 yd) upstream. In 1895, the 78-metre (255 ft) replacement was built about 1.6 kilometres (1 mi) upstream from the original one. Months later, high water cut into the north bank, requiring rock fill and additional piles to prevent the loss of the bridge.

In 1896, high water took out two spans, requiring a temporary bridge. The next year, a ferry scow was built, cable installed, and service began. At low water, a temporary bridge replaced the 12-by-4-metre (38 by 12 ft) ferry. In 1898, a new 34-metre (110 ft) bridge (plus approaches) was erected.

In 1908–09, a new 33-metre (108 ft) queen truss bridge (plus approaches) was built.

In 1930, a 37-metre (120 ft) howe truss was installed.

In 1967–68, the contract to replace the Mars Creek and Downie Creek bridges was awarded, the latter being 195 metres (640 ft) in length.

In 1983, the bridge for the rerouted higher elevation highway was tendered. The former bridge was dismantled and used for a new crossing at Boston Bar.

== Community ==
By 1894, a government store existed. About this time, the expectation was that a townsite would soon develop, because the place was the northern terminus of steamer navigation on the Columbia. A proposal to build a hotel appears to have been postponed, but stopping places existed by 1897 at two ranches.

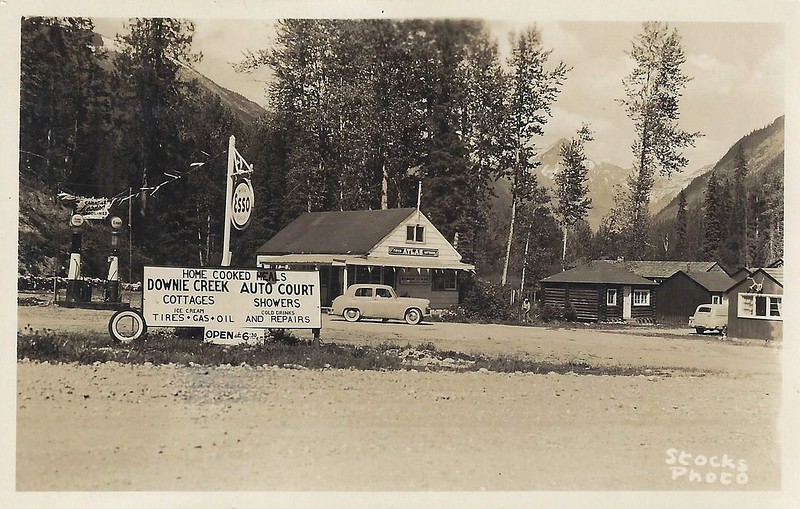
Downie Creek Auto Court, Big Bend Highway, c.1952

The former LaForme Half-way House for Pack Trains was likely the hotel seeking a liquor licence in 1910.

When the completed Big Bend Highway opened in June 1940, Downie Creek was one of three points adjacent to the highway that were identified as suitable for gas stations and other roadside services. A combined gas bar/tearoom/store, plus three small guest cabins, opened in the early 1940s. To accommodate a highway realignment, the premises moved 800 metres (0.5 mi) in 1948. Greyhound buses stopped at the tearoom prior to the Rogers Pass highway opening.

The Downie Creek Recreation site, which is maintained by the Revelstoke Rod and Gun Club, comprises 22 sites, a day use area, and a good boat launch. Adjacent are the high-voltage transmission lines from the Mica Dam, which cross the reservoir.

== Agriculture and forestry ==
In 1894, a few families took up pre-emptions on Four-mile flat (just south of the creek). Owners erected homesteads on this agricultural land. The excellent soil was expected to produce root vegetables to competitively supply the Revelstoke market.

In 1909, a logging camp operated at the river mouth.

In 1915, a forest ranger headquarters cabin was erected.

In the late 1940s, the core of a mountain pine beetle infestation existed at Downie Creek.

A sawmill operated during the 1950s and 1970s. In the late 1970s, the pine beetle severity re-emerged.

== Mining ==
In 1867, payable gold was found 13 to 16 kilometres (8 to 10 mi) from the creek mouth, but the creek was never systematically prospected.

In 1896, the province built a trail from Albert Canyon to the headwaters of Downie Creek to access several claims, including the Waverley. The next year, the trail was upgraded to a wagon road. A 3-kilometre (2 mi) trail linked to the Tangier claim, but a narrow-gauge railway line from Albert Canyon was under consideration.

The Waverley mine began shipping ore in November 1897. A revised railway route was north from Albert Canyon, northwest along Downie Creek, and south to Revelstoke. A store opened at the Waverley mine site. The avalanche danger ruled out railway construction. When Goldfields of BC had been floated in 1897 for £2 million, the Tangier and Waverley mines were the prime properties. A year later, uninstalled machinery lay scattered. The few tons of production ceased in 1899, and the assets were liquidated at great loss in 1901. At this time, the creek trail extended only 6 kilometres (3.5 mi) from the mouth. A decade later, only porcupines occupied the abandoned buildings of the two mines.

In 1920, a trail to the creek mouth was surveyed for the Waverley–Tangier mines. However, when Walters Investment Co. purchased the mine properties in 1921, the company built 13 kilometres (8 mi) of wagon road to Albert Canyon. Small crews rehabilitated the sites in 1924 and 1925, and active exploration in 1929 was promising. In 1951, 10 kilometres (6 mi) of road repairs to the Tangier site were abandoned because of forest fires. In 1987, geological mapping was conducted at both locations.

== Maps ==
- recreated Western Big Bend map. 1860s.
- "West Division of Kootenay District map". arcabc.ca. 1897.
- Western Big Bend stratigraphy map. 1979.
