= Big Bend Highway =

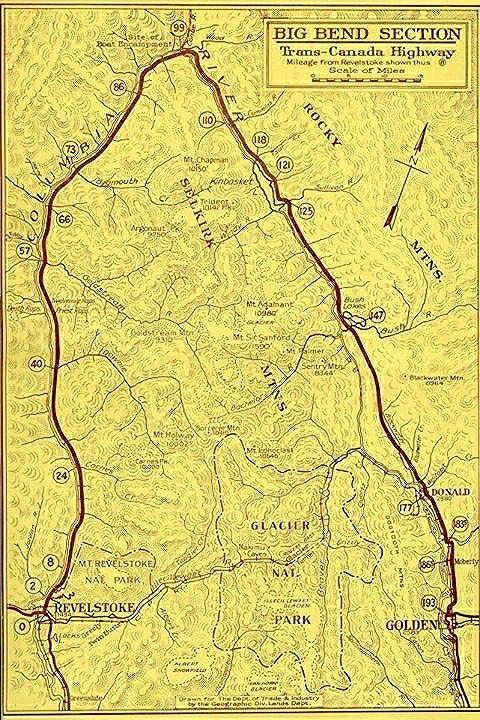

Route information
- Length: 305 km (190 mi)
- Component highways: Highway 1 (1941-1962)

Major junctions
- West end: Revelstoke
- East end: Golden

Location
- Country: Canada
- Province: British Columbia

Highway system
- British Columbia provincial highways

The Big Bend Highway is a 305-kilometre (190 mi) former highway in the interior of British Columbia, and was the original alignment of Highway 1 (Hwy 1) which followed the Columbia River between Revelstoke and Golden through the Selkirk Mountains.

== History ==
Big Bend Country was important as it was one of the few land routes possible for a wagon road to connect the Pacific Colony with the rest of British North America. After the gold rush in the late 1860s, travellers used canoes or river steamers until the completion of the Canadian Pacific Railway in the 1880s. In the early 20th century, the Southern Trans-Provincial Highway was the only automobile route which connected southwestern British Columbia with Alberta. The Big Bend Highway, part of the Central Trans-Provincial Highway, was constructed between 1929 and 1940 and was jointly funded by the provincial and federal governments. It was a relief project during the Great Depression and constructed by pick and shovel. Initially designated as Route A, it opened on June 29, 1940, and was re-designated as Hwy 1 in 1941. It was regarded as a perilous gravel road that featured steep grades and runoffs from melting snow in the summer and was closed in the winter, with travellers preferring to use a car shuttle train. In 1949, the Trans-Canada Highway Act was passed which allowed construction of the Trans-Canada Highway, and in 1956 the decision was made to reroute the highway between Revelstoke and Donald through Rogers Pass, which officially opened on September 3, 1962; reducing the travel time by approximately five hours.

After the rerouting of Hwy 1, the western segment of the Big Bend Highway between Revelstoke and Mica Creek became Hwy 23 in 1964 and was reconstructed in the late 1960s. In 1973, Mica Dam was completed and sections of the road were flooded by McNaughton Lake (now Kinbasket Lake); other sections were bypassed in the 1980s in anticipation the creation of Revelstoke Lake, which was part of the Revelstoke Dam project. An unsubmerged eastern section of the Big Bend Highway is now a forestry services road and connects with Marl Creek Provincial Park.
