= British Columbia Highway 23 =

Highway in British Columbia

Highway 23
- Nakusp – Mica Creek Highway

Route information
- Maintained by the Ministry of Transportation and Infrastructure
- Length: 248 km (154 mi)
- Existed: 1926–present

Major junctions
- South end: Highway 6 in Nakusp
- Highway 31 at Galena Bay; Highway 1 (TCH) near Revelstoke
- North end: Mica Dam north of Revelstoke

Location
- Country: Canada
- Province: British Columbia

Highway system
- British Columbia provincial highways
← Highway 22A	→ Highway 24

Highway 23 is a north–south highway that straddles the Columbia River in the Columbia Country region of British Columbia, Canada. Its section north of Revelstoke is formerly known as the Big Bend Highway and was part of the original routing of Highway 1. The Big Bend area was well known as there was a gold rush there, beginning in 1864. Travelers used canoes or river steamers until a dirt-surfaced "highway" was built on the east bank around the Big Bend, from Revelstoke to Golden, from 1930 to 1937, opening officially in 1940, and it served as the trans-provincial highway until 1962 when the Rogers Pass portion of the Trans-Canada Highway was opened.

Highway 23 was initially opened in 1964, and it was re-aligned through the latter half of the 1960s. Realignment of the highway also occurred in the early 1980s, in anticipation of the creation of the reservoir for the Revelstoke Dam (Revelstoke Lake), which flooded lower parts of the highway.

== Route details ==
Highway 23, which is 250 km (160 mi) long, begins in the south at Nakusp, where it meets Highway 6. Highway 23 winds north along the eastern shore of Upper Arrow Lake for 49 km (30 mi) to its junction with Highway 31 at Galena Bay. The Upper Arrow Lake Ferry continues Highway 23 across Upper Arrow Lake to a location known as Shelter Bay. North of Shelter Bay, Highway 23 follows the west bank of the Columbia River for 49 km (30 mi) to where it meets the Trans-Canada Highway. Highway 23 follows the Trans-Canada east through the city of Revelstoke for 1 km (0.62 mi), finally turning north after leaving Revelstoke.

North of Revelstoke, Highway 23 entirely follows the east bank of Revelstoke Lake for 151 km (94 mi), past the old townsite of Mica Creek to its northern terminus at the Mica Dam facility.

== Major intersections ==
Regional District	Location	km	mi	Destinations	Notes
Central Kootenay	Nakusp	0.00	0.00	Highway 6 – Nelson, Castlegar, Vernon	Highway 23 southern terminus
Columbia-Shuswap	Galena Bay	44.97	27.94	Highway 31 east – Trout Lake, Kaslo	
Columbia-Shuswap		46.82	29.09	Upper Arrow Lake Ferry crosses Upper Arrow Lake; Kilometrage does not include ferry	
Columbia-Shuswap	Revelstoke	95.87	59.57	Highway 1 (TCH) west – Salmon Arm, Kamloops	West end of Highway 1 concurrency
Columbia-Shuswap	Revelstoke	96.42	59.91	Revelstoke Bridge crosses the Columbia River	
Columbia-Shuswap	Revelstoke	96.88	60.20	Victoria Road – City Centre	
Columbia-Shuswap	Revelstoke	97.31	60.47	Highway 1 (TCH) east – Golden	East end of Highway 1 concurrency
Columbia-Shuswap	Revelstoke	101.09	62.81	Revelstoke Dam	
Columbia-Shuswap		247.82	153.99	Mica Dam	Highway 23 northern terminus
1.000 mi = 1.609 km; 1.000 km = 0.621 mi: Concurrency terminus
