= Rocky Mountain Trench =

Long valley in the United States and Canada

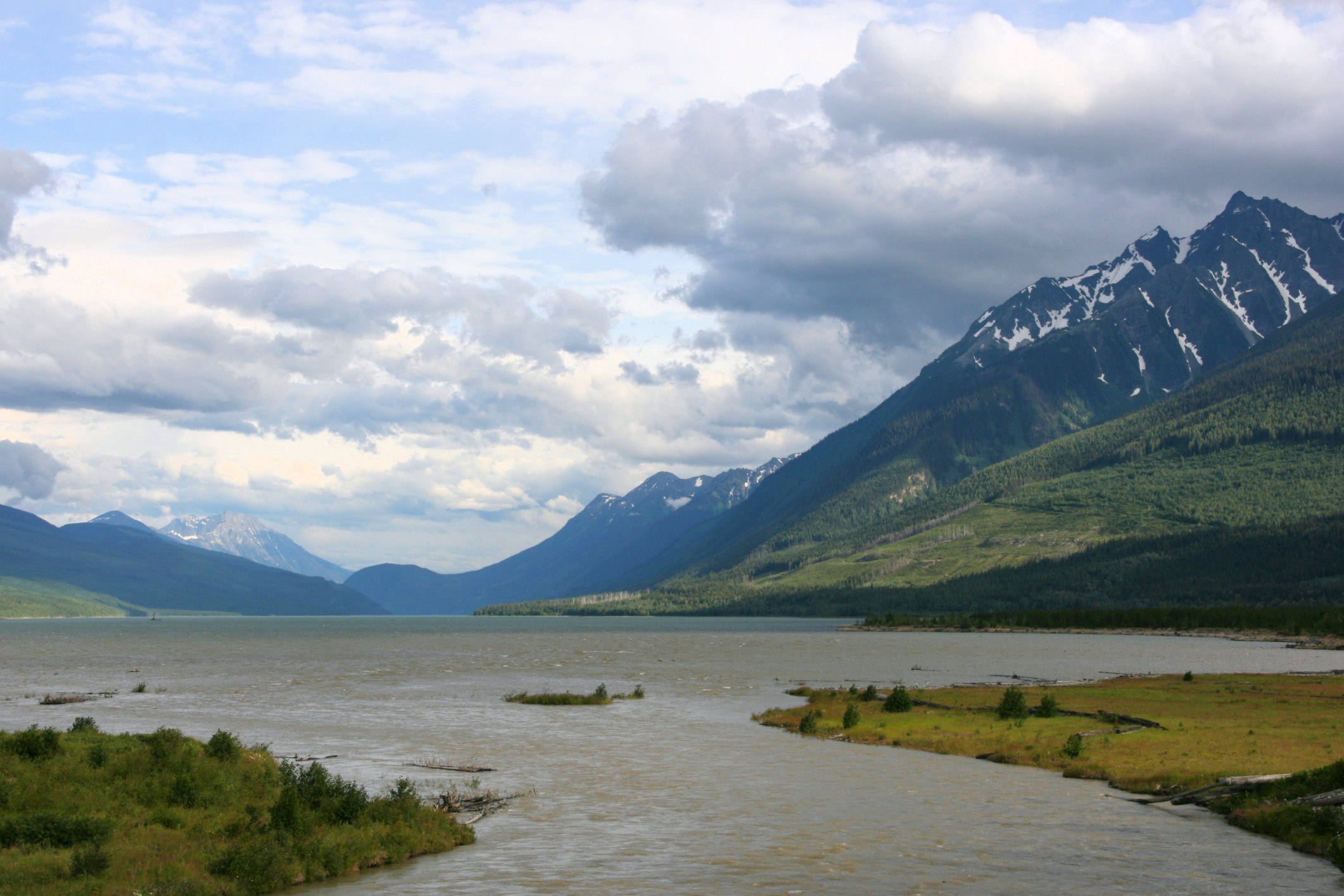
- Kinbasket Lake lies in the Rocky Mountain Trench
- Floor elevation: 600–900 m (2,000–3,000 ft)
- Length: 1,600 km (1,000 mi)
- Width: 3–16 km (2–10 mi)

Geography
- Coordinates: 54°30′N 122°30′W
- Interactive map of Rocky Mountain Trench

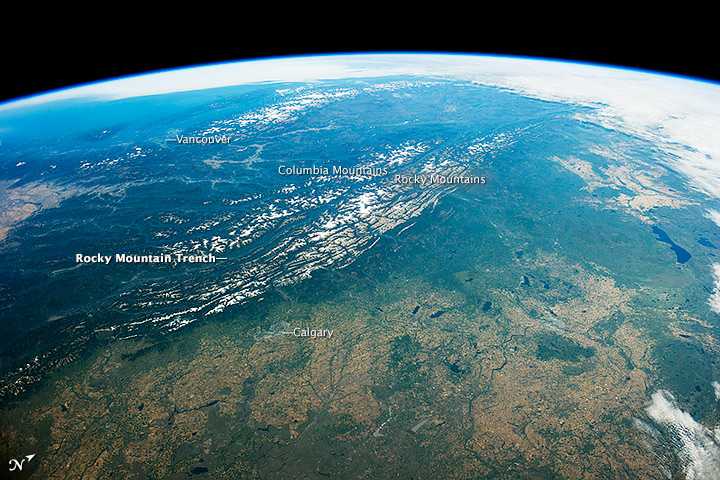
Rocky Mountain Trench, astronaut photo from ISS, 2014

The Rocky Mountain Trench, also known as the Valley of a Thousand Peaks or simply the Trench, is a large valley on the western side of the northern part of North America's Rocky Mountains. The Trench is both visually and cartographically a striking physiographic feature extending approximately 1,600 km (1,000 mi) from Flathead Lake, Montana, to the Liard River, just south of the British Columbia–Yukon border near Watson Lake, Yukon. The trench bottom is 3–16 km (1.9–9.9 mi) wide and is 600–900 m (2,000–3,000 ft) above sea level. The general orientation of the Trench is an almost straight 150/330° geographic north vector and has become convenient as a visual guide for aviators heading north or south.

Although some of its topography has been carved into U-shaped glacial valleys, it is primarily a byproduct of geologic faulting. The Trench separates the Rocky Mountains on its east from the Columbia Mountains and the Cassiar Mountains on its west. It also skirts part of the McGregor Plateau area of the Nechako Plateau sub-area of the Interior Plateau of British Columbia. It is up to 25 km (16 mi) wide, if measured peak-to-peak, and varies in valley relief, but is clearly visible by air and satellite/remote sensing and is easily discernible to those ascending any of the mountains or ridges lining it.

The Trench is drained by four major river basins: the Columbia, Fraser, Peace and Liard. Two reservoirs of the Columbia River Treaty fill much of its length today - Lake Koocanusa and Lake Kinbasket. A further British Columbia power initiative created Lake Williston. Rivers that follow the Trench, at least in part, are the Kootenay River, the Columbia River, the Canoe River, the Flathead River, the Fraser River, the Parsnip River, the Finlay River, the Fox River, and the Kechika River. The North Fork of the Flathead River, flowing into Flathead Lake with the other branches of the Flathead River, is part of the Columbia River system. The Kechika is part of the Liard River system, and the Fox, Parsnip and Finlay Rivers are part of the Peace River system. The Canoe River is a short tributary of the Columbia system, draining into Kinbasket Lake, a reservoir on the Columbia River. The Kootenai River, however, does not fully follow the Trench but exits Canada southwest via Lake Koocanusa reservoir to the Libby Dam. The Kootenay River (Canadian spelling) is a tributary of the Columbia, joining the Columbia at Castlegar, BC, after a meander through the United States as the Kootenai River (US spelling).

For convenience the Rocky Mountain Trench may be divided into two sections, the Northern Trench (between the Muskwa Ranges and Interior Mountains) and the Southern Trench (between the Continental Ranges and Columbia Mountains), separated by the northeastern portion of the Interior Plateau west of the Hart Ranges. The Copley Range of the Arctic Pacific Lakes Provincial Park forms the drainage divide between the northerly Parsnip-Finlay-Peace system into the Arctic Ocean (via the Mackenzie River) and the southwesterly McGregor-Fraser system into the Pacific Ocean. The northern end of the Columbia Mountains at ~54°N near Prince George, British Columbia, where the Fraser River leaves the Trench to enter the Interior Plateau, may be used for this purpose. The northern portion of the Trench is dominated by strike-slip faulting, while the southern part of the Trench was created by normal faults. Despite differences in timing and faulting styles of the northern and southern portions, they were aligned with each other because faulting for both was controlled by a pre-existing, west-facing, deep basement ramp with over 10 km (33,000 ft) of vertical offset.

== Northern Rocky Mountain Trench ==
The Northern Rocky Mountain Trench is closely aligned with the Tintina Trench near the British Columbia-Yukon border at 60 degrees north latitude, and the two trenches could arguably be classified as one and the same - or 'extensions' of each other. The Tintina Trench extends further north-westward through the Yukon into Alaska. The visible expression of the two trenches is lost where they plunge under the boreal forests of the Liard Plain proximate to the small communities of Watson Lake, Yukon and Lower Post, BC. The highest point in the northern Trench is Sifton Pass at an elevation of about 1,010 m (3,310 ft) near the bend of Scarcity Creek.

=== Geology ===
Right-lateral strike-slip movement of the Tintina Fault on the Tintina-Northern Rocky Mountain Trench may have begun during the middle Jurassic. The fastest rates of slip probably occurred during two pulses in the middle Cretaceous and early Cenozoic, respectively, with the latter probably occurring during the Eocene. Between 750 km (470 mi)to over 900 km (560 mi) of total right-lateral movement has occurred, of which 450 km (280 mi) of offset has occurred since the mid-Cretaceous. The result is that terrains to the west of the fault system have moved toward the north. In the context of plate tectonics, strike-slip movement of the Tintina Fault on the Tintina-Northern Rocky Mountain Trench is also related to strike-slip movement along the San Andreas Fault, the extension of the Basin and Range Province, and other extensional or strike-slip fault systems in western North America. The Tintina Fault is one of the two major fault zones paralleling the Northern Cordilleran Volcanic Province, the other being the Denali Fault in the Yukon, the U.S. state of Alaska and along the British Columbia Coast.

=== History and accessibility ===
First Nations have traditionally always travelled the northern Trench. There are several post-European contact travels up the northern Trench - often of large proportion. The Trench here remains mostly wild, and the northern 300 km (190 mi) is essentially without roads, excepting a few cat trails for fire, outfitters, or logging. It is due to several turns of fate, and strategic administrative decisions since 1824, that the most natural land transportation corridor in northern British Columbia has been left in a wild state. On many government maps produced since 1897, indications of a passable trail have been published. However, with changes in the terrain caused by beaver dams or forest fires, and despite maintenance by guide-outfitters, the trail from Fox Lake north is often hard to find, or obliterated to all but indigenous and experienced Kaska natives. It may be more commonly used as an aviation route today.

The northern trench from the Highway 97 bridge on the Parsnip River has routes on both sides of Williston Lake to Fort Ware. The route up the east side cannot be followed due to the Peace Reach of the reservoir. The road traveler will use the gravel road up the west side of the Reservoir to Ware. Beyond that point the northbound traveller will only find a narrow cat guard (a cat guard is a primitive road constructed as a fire guard by heavy equipment-usually a bulldozer-to prevent the spread of a forest fire by creating a fuel free perimeter) for a few kilometres.

The Kaska Dena culture of Fort Ware and Lower Post refer to their ancestral use of the 300 km (190 mi) natural route as The Trail of The Ancient Ones. They also call it the Davie Trail honoring David Braconnier, the founding chief of the community at Ware (Fort Ware - originally called Kwadacha which the HBC named Whitewater Post)

1797 - John Finlay records the forks of the Finlay and Parsnip Rivers and ventures part way up each river. The Finlay River later comes to bear his name.

1823 to 1825 - Samuel Black was sent by the HBC north through Finlay Forks to The Fox River (Kwadacha) and returned later that season. He narrowly missed being the first white person to go all the way up the Northern Trench to the Liard River but chose not to listen to his guide - heading north westward seeking the source of the Finlay River instead. He travels far enough NW to discover the headwaters of another Trench tributary - The Turnagain River. Natives there find a marker left by Black and report it to historic Fort Halkett on the Liard River.

1831 - John Macleod of the HBC records the mouth of the Kechika River emptying out of the northern end of the Trench into the Liard near the BC-Yukon border.

1872 - Capt. William F. Butler ascends part of the Finlay River and records both the Fox River and Fox Lake to the north (Ft. Ware / Kwadacha was not yet established.)

1897 to 1898 – The Canadian government sends a police patrol under Inspector Moodie to map a possible supply route from the Peace River to the Yukon - specifically Dawson City. The patrol, assumed to have perished, eventually arrived at Fort Selkirk. They proved the viability of the route and produced a surviving map of it. (Yukon Archives)

1898 – McGregor's book The Klondike Rush Though Edmonton summarizes various sources (papers) saying up to 45 parties were reported along the route from Fox River to Sylvestre's Landing. There was also a reported drive of cattle on this route (echoed in Moodie's reports and in Kaska oral history.)

1906 – A North West Mounted Police patrol under field supervision of Inspector Constantine began the construction of the Police Trail westward from Hudson Hope and then northward up the Northern Trench from HBC's post at Fort Graham.

1907 - British Columbia Premier R. McBride intervened and asked Canada to direct the police resources to connect with the more westerly Telegraph Trail route. Under protest, the NWMP field team did so. That trail was soon abandoned due to its non-viable character. The political route departure from Fort Graham westward added 400 rugged snowy kilometres to the total distance without going any favorable ground or measurable distance closer to the north. The Davie Trail is noted to be excellent for wintering horse due to low snow accumulations.

1912 - British Columbia Magazine - prospector Bower reports Sifton Pass as the most eventual and most practicable for a railway form the Fraser River to the Yukon.

1914 - Premier McBride advocates a railway on Insp. Moodie's route according to B. Kenelly in a pamphlet 'The British Columbia Peace. Fort St John' 1936.

1926 - Whitewater Post is established by HBC. Whitewater is the translation of Kwadacha, a nearby river.

1930 to 1931 - British Columbia Department of Public Works investigates a road route over Sifton Pass.

1934 - Charles Bedaux, a noted international workplace management consultant (time and motion studies) leads and finances the Bedaux Expedition - formally known as the Bedaux Canadian Subarctic Expedition. While his advance scouts arrive at McDame Post near Good Hope Lake, the leader and entourage abandon their mission at Driftpile Creek due to fatigue, lack of horse feed, and impending winter. The controversial adventure is the subject of a 1995 Bedaux film biography titled Champagne Safari.

1942 - February a final decision was reached regarding the A, B, and C routes for a northern Highway. It will connect the North West Staging Route airfields and bypass the Northern Trench for the joint Canada-Alaska Highway Alcan Highway, alternately Alaska Highway. The three routes had been the subject of considerable economic competition between governments and communities since the Klondike Gold Rush. The A route was a Stikine option similar to Highway 37 of today. The B route favors the Trench option. The C route following the airfields east of the Rocky Mountains and then crossing to the west near the Liard River is the chosen route.

1942 - March 28 the American government initiates a highly secret survey. It was undertaken for the purpose of assessing a military railway link up the Northern Rocky Mountain Trench. It was completed on Sept 28. Nov 15 US General Somervell declines to proceed with a military railway. Canada's Major Charles presents drawings for the Northern Trench portion of a railway from Ware to Lower Post of 351.6 km (218.5 mi), $112,000,000 cost, with 17,000 personnel over 400 days. Of the 1217 total miles of proposed railway to Alaska, 530 are on Canadian soil and lie within the Northern Rocky Mountain Trench or the Tintina Trench.

1949 - US Congress Public Law 391 authorises a location survey for a railway from Prince George to Fairbanks. Prince George Board of Trade advocates the Trench route - the B route.

1950 - October, Canadian Transport Minister Lionel Chevrier advocates the 1942 route in a secret document to Federal Cabinet. A budget of $750,000,000 is presented.

1953 - Whitewater Post or Kwadacha of the HBC closes. Today the Kaska Dena Community of Fort Ware (Ware) remains as a full-time settlement.

1957 - Swedish industrial savant Axel Wenner-Gren advocates resource mega-developments for the Peace River area. Among his proposals he envisions a monorail up the Northern Trench. Some area proposals came to partial fruition but the monorail did not.

1960 to 1967 - The Government of BC declines the Northern Trench as their strategic railway choice, favoring instead a route to the west similar to the telegraph route. Part of the reason is that the Lower Finlay and Parsnip River portions of the Northern Trench would be flooded by the damming of the Peace River. Reservoir land acquisition commences. Their selected westerly rail route - the Dease Lake Extension along the A Route - has been, in part, abandoned, and in lesser part been reopened to Takla Siding for logging use.

1964 - US Congress tables the NAWAPA proposal by Parsons Engineering Group - would see flooding of the portions of the Trench as part of a continental-scale water diversion.

1971 - Sir Ranulph Fiennes descends the Trench from Kechika mouth - mostly on foot, partly solo as part of his circum-polar expedition . For this and other feats he is later recorded by Guinness Book of Records as the World's 'Greatest Living Explorer.'

1981 - 'Skook' Davidson; long time outfitter proposes a 'federal' national park in the Northern Trench.

1998 - After several years of round table discussions The British Columbia Government takes first legislative steps to establish a 'provincial' Muskwa-Kechika Management Area It covers an area considerably larger than the floor of the Trench and its immediate tributaries.

1999 - Karsten Heuer completes the final section of the Y2Y hike (Yellowstone to Yukon) at Lower Post

2000 - Extension of the Muskwa-Kechika Management Area into the Northern Trench. Much of the Northern Rocky Mountain Trench's furthest reach is within this British Columbia Protected Area. Significant exposure is given to the M-KMA in the November 2008 National Geographic Magazine as a follow-up to their partial funding of a recent expedition to Gataga Pass.

In 2009 context the Northern Trench could have, and might yet, become the preferred route for the 120-year-old concept of a Canada Alaska Railway concept. Discussions among feasibility experts still do not seem to favor the B Route despite it being lower, more direct, fewer major river crossings and considerably less snow.

== Southern Rocky Mountain Trench ==
=== Geology ===
The Southern Rocky Mountain Trench was created mainly by Cenozoic-aged extension (normal faulting). What little strike-slip movement that is found in the southern trench is not considered significant. The extensional faulting was nonetheless substantial, having extended as deep as 13.5 km (8.4 mi). The southern trench also differs from the northern trench in that it is more sinuous and is asymmetrical in cross-section (perpendicular to its length). The western side of the Southern Rocky Mountain Trench is more subdued and irregular than the east side. During late Paleozoic to Mesozoic time, rapid sediment deposition and subsidence to the west transitioned in the area of the modern Rocky Mountain Trench into a stable continental shelf in the east. The Nevadan Orogeny destroyed the western wedge of sedimentary rocks during Jurassic to middle Cretaceous time, thrusting them up into metamorphic fold belts. Currently, strata on either side of the Southern Rocky Mountain Trench consist mainly of Precambrian and Paleozoic metasedimentary and sedimentary rocks. Within the trench are unconsolidated Cenozoic sandstones and conglomerates.

The aforementioned basement ramp along which orogeny-related thrust faulting and subsequent strike-slip and normal faulting occurred is probably associated with the ancient continental shelf of Paleozoic and Mesozoic time.

=== Geography ===
The southern Rocky Mountain Trench comprises approximately one half of the Trench in British Columbia and includes three regions, the Robson Valley, Columbia Valley and East Kootenay (from north to south). It hosts dozens of communities and two major reservoirs - Kinbasket Lake, and Lake Koocanusa (an acronym of Kootenay/Canada/USA.) There are intersections with two other trench features. At the approximate midpoint of Kinbasket Lake, the now submerged Columbia River exits the Trench in an almost southerly direction toward Revelstoke and flows beyond to its point of exit from Canada south of Trail BC. West of Donald BC, the Beaver river flows in from the south - but it represents the intersection of the lesser but impressive feature called the Purcell Trench. The Purcell Trench as it proceeds southward becomes the valley of the Duncan River and Duncan and Kootenay Lakes.

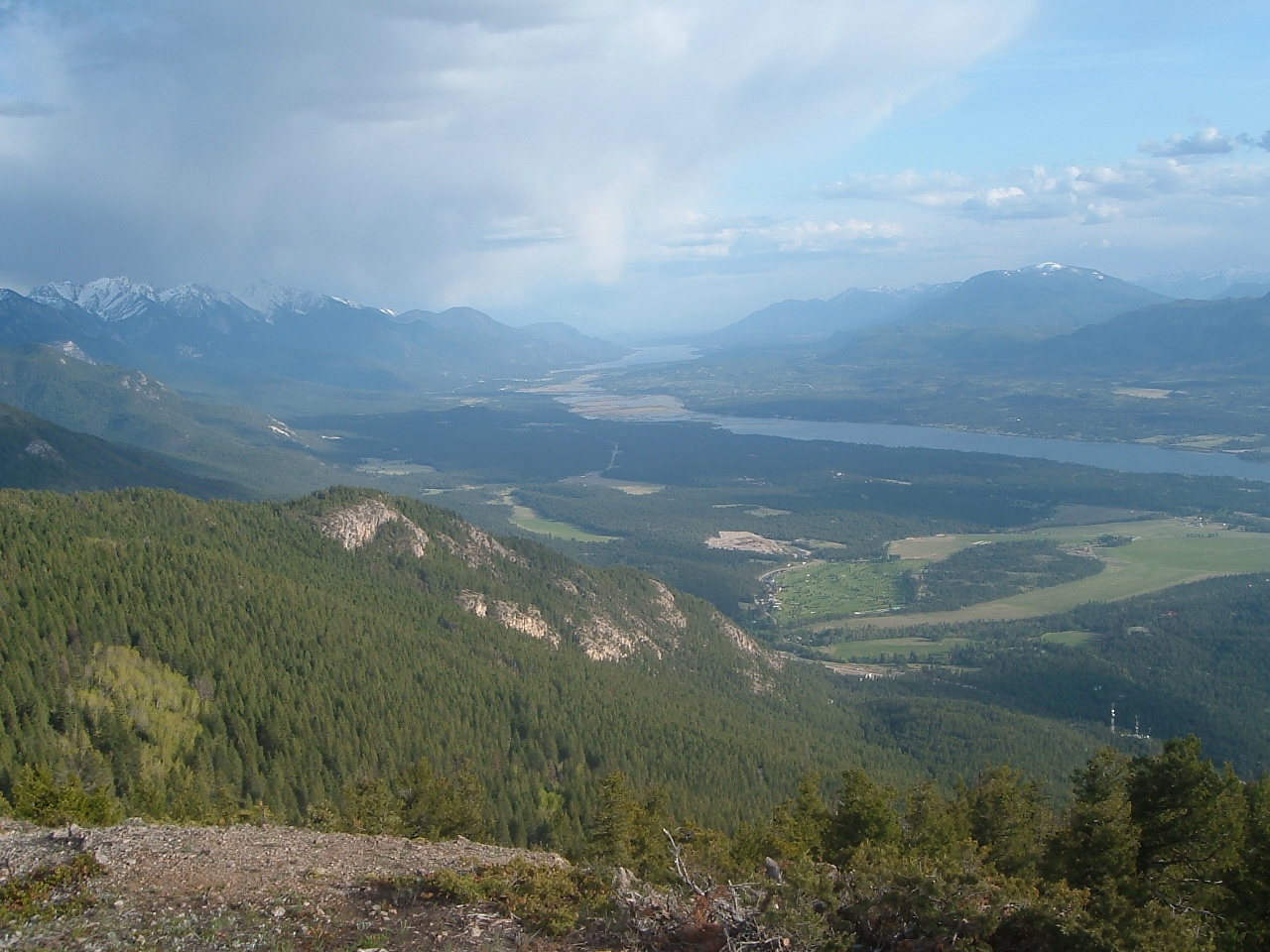
The Columbia Valley is part of the Southern Rocky Mountain Trench

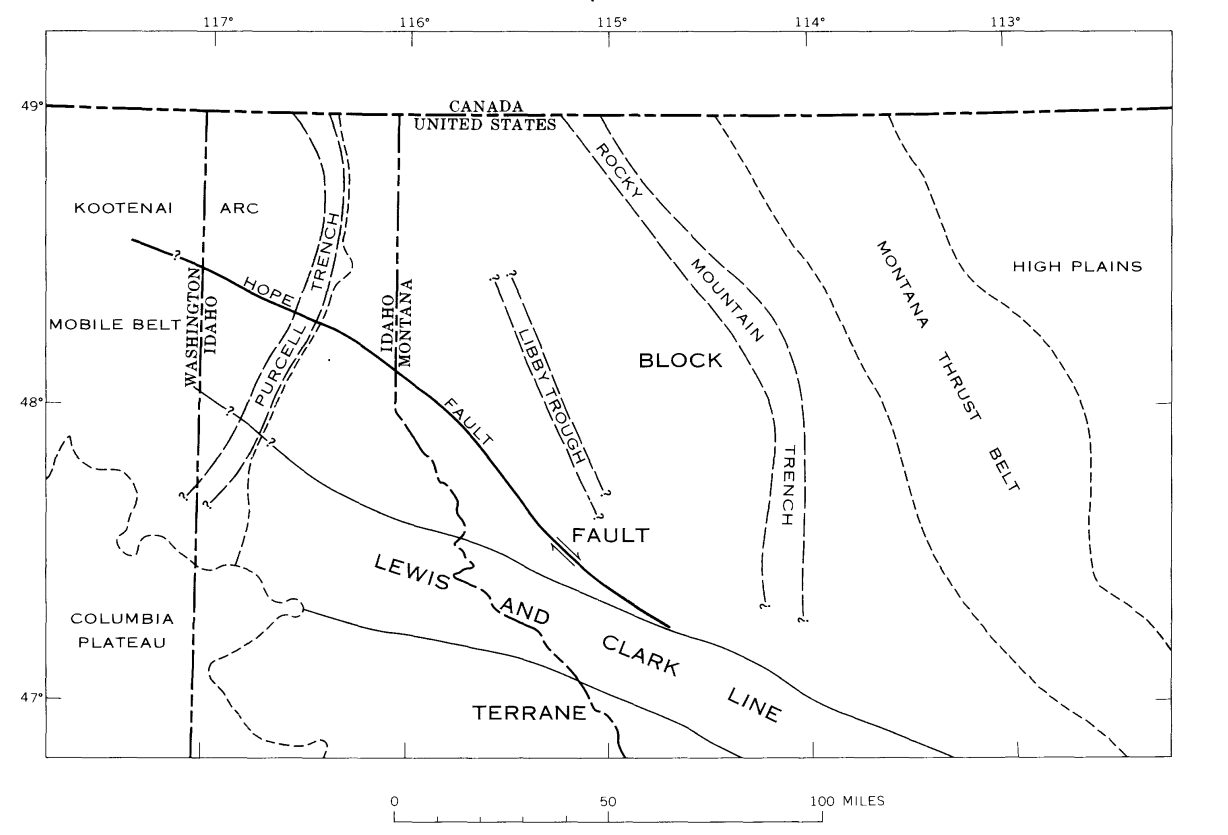
Geological map of the Purcell and Rocky Mountain Trenches within the U.S.

There are four geographic segments of the Southern Rocky Mountain Trench:

1. The segment of the Trench encompassing the uppermost court of the Fraser River from east of Prince George and continuing southeastward to the town of Valemount is known as the Robson Valley, named after Mount Robson which overlooks its southern end. Valemount is the Westerly portal to the Yellowhead Pass.
2. From Valemount and Canoe Southeastward to the eastern egress of Rogers Pass at Donald, BC just north of the town of Golden the Trench cradles the waters of Kinbasket Lake the reservoir created by Mica Dam; this region before the reservoir was part of the route of the interprovincial highway, once known as the Big Bend Highway, prior to the 1960s opening of the Roger's Pass section of the Trans-Canada.
3. The Trench from Golden extending SE to the headwaters of the Columbia River at Columbia Lake is known as the Columbia Valley. Golden is the westerly portal to the Kicking Horse Pass on Highway #1 eastbound to Alberta.
4. The southernmost Canadian part of the Trench is the core of a region known as the East Kootenay, comprising the upper of the two Canadian portions of the valley of the Kootenay River. Here, near Cranbrook, British Columbia, the Trench is much wider than to the northwest, forming more of a broad basin than the U-shaped valley which typifies most of the Trench elsewhere from Columbia Lake northwards to the Liard. This segment bifurcates near Wasa 100 km north of the US border. The off-shooting western fork contains the City of Cranbrook affords access to the nearby City of Kimberley. Elko is the westerly portal to the Crowsnest Pass on Highway 3 eastbound to Alberta.

The southward transborder extension of the Trench into Montana is the primary containment for Lake Koocanusa, a Kootenay River reservoir created by the Libby Dam near Libby, Montana.

=== Culture and economy ===
The large valley and tributaries have always offered an economy based on ranching and logging. This has been supplemented by fortuitous locations of several mines - often in side valleys and producing lead, zinc, coal and gypsum. The Canadian Pacific Railway (CPR) also constructed a spur line which extends northward up the southern Trench between Cranbrook and Golden. This serves to interconnect the southerly rail route of the Crowsnest Pass to the CPR mainline through Rogers Pass. Today it carries Crowsnest coal to Tsawwassen for export. A southerly rail-link through Yahk enables freight shipments into Idaho and the Western US.

Tourism has become an active force in the economy. The Southern Trench is also known for a number of ski resorts in the trench or in the nearby tributary valleys. These destinations include Fairmont, Panorama, Kimberley, Purden, Kicking Horse and the original Bugaboo heli-ski lodge. Numerous other ski touring and back country lodges are also found here. The summer sports of golf, boating, fishing, and hiking round out the appeal to a growing weekend and permanent recreational population.

Hunting, fishing, off-roading, and camping will continue to be attractive pastimes. These include guided activities and individual pursuit of the area.

The mix of low elevation, good climate, fine scenery, diverse recreation and resort accommodation has fostered a vacation-based real estate industry for communities and rural areas surrounding Cranbrook, Windermere, Invermere, Radium, and Golden. There are many other local unincorporated communities and post offices.

== Settlements and localities ==
The Trench has hosted only a few communities. From north to south they are:

- Lower Post, British Columbia
- Fort Ware (Kwadacha)
- Ingenika Point
- Mesilinka (submerged)
- Fort Grahame (submerged)
- Mackenzie, British Columbia
- Holmes River, British Columbia
- McBride, British Columbia
- Tête Jaune Cache, British Columbia
- Valemount, British Columbia
- Boat Encampment (submerged)
- Golden, British Columbia
- Radium Hot Springs, British Columbia
- Invermere, British Columbia
- Fairmont Hot Springs, British Columbia
- Canal Flats, British Columbia
- Kimberley, British Columbia
- Cranbrook, British Columbia
- Eureka, Montana
- Whitefish, Montana
- Kalispell, Montana
