= Big Bend Gold Rush =

1860s gold rush in British Columbia

The Big Bend Gold Rush was a gold rush in the Big Bend Country of the Colony of British Columbia (now a Canadian province) in the mid-1860s.

== History ==
=== Discovery & early miners ===
In 1861, the gold commissioner at Rock Creek reported a First Nations account of coarse gold some miles above the Boat Encampment. However, the actual first "strike" by Europeans is unclear. That year, a party of miners led by Hamilton McKenzie paddled up the Columbia River and wintered near Death Rapids. During 1861–1862, small teams worked the Columbia bars and its tributaries. Four Frenchmen, who had settled on French Creek in spring 1865, were very successful. To avoid the gold export tax, half the gold leaving for the U.S. was estimated to be unreported.

=== Context ===
Gold rushes expanded the colony beyond Vancouver Island onto the mainland. These emanated from the Fraser Canyon Gold Rush, the first to dominate the colony's history. A huge influx of miners, drawn from California to the Fraser, dispersed throughout the colony in search of gold. Other rushes during the period were in Rock Creek, Wild Horse Creek, the Cariboo, Omineca, Perry Creek, and Stikine, as well as the Colville and Colorado Gold Rushes.

=== Access ===
The upper Columbia was extremely remote. Many prospectors came overland up the Rocky Mountain Trench from what is now Montana, or up the Columbia River from Washington Territory. A regular steamboat service on the Columbia from Marcus, Washington Terr. to La Porte, the head of navigation, began in 1866, but was first attempted in 1865. From Vancouver Island, the route via Portland up the Columbia was also promoted.

However, most left the Cariboo goldfields to head eastward along the wagon road to present day Savona, to board a steamer. Maintaining an easterly direction, they crossed Kamloops Lake, passed Fort Kamloops, along the South Thompson River, crossed Little Shuswap Lake, and along the Little River, and across Shuswap Lake (formerly called Big Shuswap Lake). The SS Marten operated the 111-mile (179 km) Savona–Seymour run to the mouth of the Seymour River. Trails over the Monashee Mountains, familiar to First Nations, led to the Columbia. Seymour to the Columbia was 35 miles (56 km), with snow 20 feet (6 m) deep in places. Parties from Kamloops also travelled overland in pack trains, completing the journey down Smith Creek (a.k.a. Gaffney or Kirbyville creek) to the Columbia.

=== 1865–1866 rush ===
In 1865, William Downie, an experienced prospector, and his party of ex-Cariboo miners ascended the Columbia from Marcus. They discovered gold in paying quantities at Carnes Creek. Others continued up the Columbia to the Goldstream, and its tributaries, French and McCullough creeks, and were also well rewarded. News spread, and the rush truly began in 1866. Between 8,000–10,000 flocked to the creeks and valleys. That year, the SS Forty-Nine commenced ferrying miners to La Porte, at the foot of Death Rapids. Conflicting accounts put this at either four or 37 trips from Marcus during the season. The Marten made twice weekly trips to Seymour. Many smaller boats also operated on the Shuswap. During the previous winter, a number of miners had hauled their equipment across the frozen lake.

The main ore finds were on the southwestward leg of the river beyond the bend, south from today's Mica Creek. At French Creek City in 1866, Arthur W. Vowell was appointed constable (one of the four colonial constables prior to Confederation), serving for six years. Peter O'Reilly was appointed as gold commissioner, and Walter Moberly laid out the proposed town site. Kirbyville arose on the Goldstream. Prospecting spread from above to below the rapids, venturing along Downie Creek. The mining settlements around French Creek, McCullough Creek, Kirbyville, and Wilson's Landing became sizeable towns with cabins, hotels, stores, saloons, blacksmith shops, laundries, billiard halls, and barber shops. In one incident, 18 miners drowned when a boat capsized in the rapids.

=== Outcome ===
By year end, the rush was over. In 1869, 37 miners remained at French Creek, and none on the others creeks. The rush itself had been modest in terms of earnings compared to the Fraser and Cariboo. Big Bend mining activity sporadically occurred later. Most of the goldfields, and what remained of their boomtowns and old mining camps and workings, are now submerged by the reservoirs of Mica Dam or Revelstoke Canyon Dam.

== See also ==
- British Columbia Gold Rushes
