= William Downie =

Scottish prospector and explorer

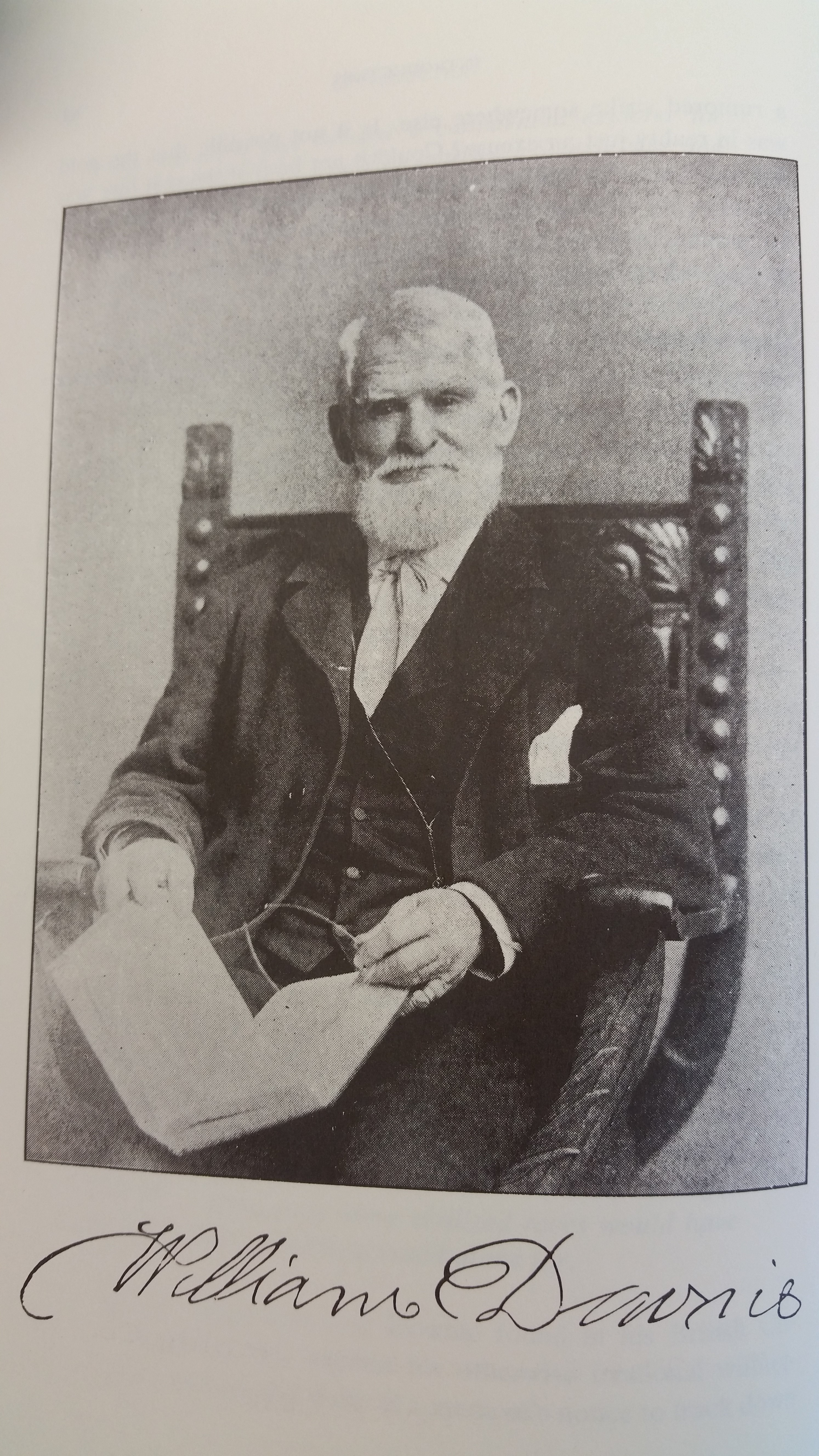
William Downie

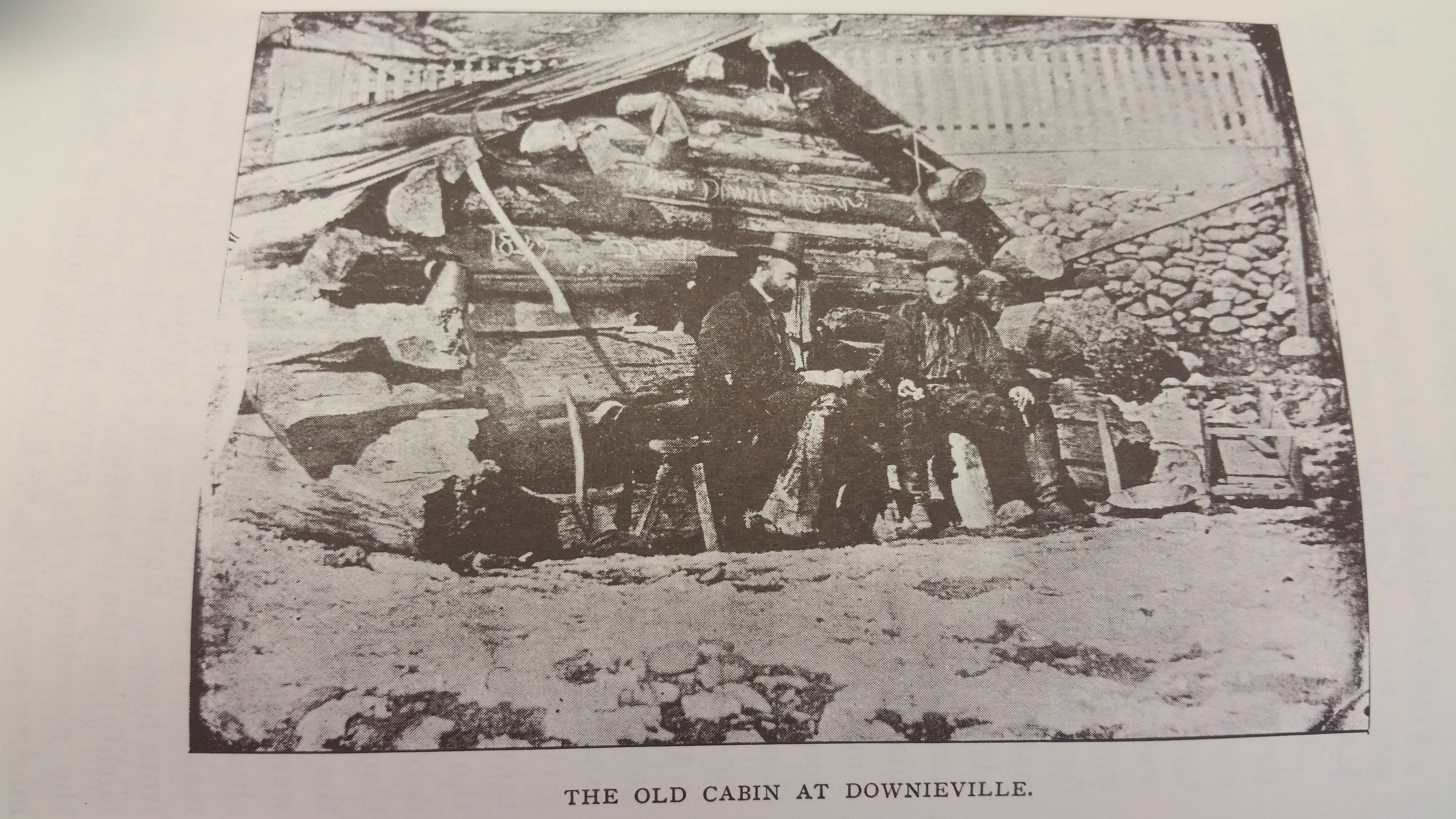
William Downie's cabin with William Downie on the right

William Downie (1819–1893) was a Scottish prospector and explorer involved in the gold rushes in California and British Columbia of the mid-19th century.

== Life and death ==
Downie was born in Glasgow, Scotland, and raised in Ayrshire.

In gold rush-era California, Major Downie led an expedition up the North Fork of the Yuba River after having arrived in San Francisco on 27 June 1849. On 5 October he led a group of African American sailors and one Irish lad, eventually reaching the forks of the North Yuba. Downie stated, "The spot where the town stands was then the handsomest I have ever seen in the mountains." They found gold all along the river, not even needing a shovel to do so.

Downieville, California was adopted as the town name in a local election, and the original name of "The Forks" was gradually dropped.

Downie explored British Columbia at the request of Governor James Douglas. In 1858 he investigated the route from Bute Inlet to the Cariboo via the Homathko River, an attempted development of which led to the Chilcotin War a few years later. At the onset of the Big Bend Gold Rush of 1865, Downie travelled up the Columbia River before steamboat service on that route began.

Then in 1874, Downie left for Panama where he sought gold and silver by grave robbing. He then visited Alaska as he states, "for the purpose of taking a cursory glance of this wonderful country."

Downie died on 27 December 1893 on board the steamer City of Puebla just before disembarking in San Francisco from Victoria, British Columbia.

== Legacy ==
Downieville, California is named for Major Downie. He is also the namesake of Downie Peak in the Selkirks. Also named for him is the former goldrush boomtown of Downie Creek, at the confluence of the stream of the same name with the Columbia River and adjacent to the vanished boomtown of La Porte, both at the heart of the Big Bend goldfields.
