= Boat Encampment =

- Location of Boat Encampment in British Columbia
- Coordinates: 52°06′59″N 118°26′04″W
- Country: Canada
- Province: British Columbia
- Region: Columbia Valley/East Kootenay
- Regional District: Columbia-Shuswap

Boat Encampment is a ghost town in the East Kootenay region of southeastern British Columbia, Canada. The locality was at the tip of the Big Bend on the north shore of the Columbia River. The general vicinity, on the former Big Bend Highway, was by road about 151 kilometres (94 mi) northwest of Golden and 159 kilometres (99 mi) north of Revelstoke.

== Precise location ==
The initial site was on a long woody point, but the appearance on maps has ranged from the west shore of the Canoe River to the former highway bridge about 2.4 kilometres (1.5 mi) southeast of the former mouth of the Wood River. The consensus places the initial location between the mouths of the Canoe and Wood rivers. After the highway was opened, the bridge location assumed the name and was chosen for viewing purposes as the site for the 1953 cairn and plaque. A fishing lodge opened in the vicinity. In 1943, the area was designated a National Historic Site of Canada. In 1973, the historic marker was relocated when the enlarged Kinbasket Lake formed the Mica Dam reservoir. In 2000, a memorial plaque was placed at a visitor site on the south shore of the Columbia.

== Early significance ==
When David Thompson of the fur trading North West Company (NWC) attempted his usual westward crossing of the Continental Divide via the Howse Pass in September 1810, the hostile Piegan Blackfeet blocked his passage, forcing his party to divert northward to the uncharted Athabasca Pass. After a tortuous journey, the party reached the Boat Encampment site in January, 1811. Four discontented members deserted. The remainder continued upstream on the Columbia, but further discontent prompted a return to Boat Encampment, where they built a cabin for the winter. During his stay, Thompson built a canoe, naming the adjacent waterway the Canoe River. They split cedar into thin boards because the preferred birch bark lacked thickness. In the spring, they proceeded down the Columbia on their journey to the coast. Within a few years, Athabasca Pass became the accepted route for the fur brigades. In 1821, when the NWC merged into the Hudson's Bay Company (HBC), the latter adopted the route for the once or twice-annual HBC "Express" linking the west with Hudson Bay. By river, the distance to Fort Vancouver was 1,477 kilometres (918 mi).

The Athabasca trail northeastward from Boat Encampment comprised Wood River, Jeffrey Creek, Pacific Creek, Committee's Punch Bowl, Athabasca Pass, Whirlpool River, Athabasca River, Brûlé Lake, and terminated at Jasper House (first location). Gradually, the eastern terminus moved westward, having a final location in the vicinity of Henry House. Cabins, stables and a boathouse existed at Boat Encampment. Each eastbound party would exchange boats for horses and snowshoes with each westbound one. However, the former would wait up to a month for the latter to arrive. On one occasion, having waited 39 days, the eastbound were about to return down the river, when word was received of the westbound imminent arrival. After 1849, the route and site were largely abandoned when the HBC switched to the Tête Jaune Cache route via the Fraser River.

From the late 1890s to early 1900s, the place was known as a mining camp 180 kilometres (110 mi) north of Revelstoke.

== Name origin ==
Earlier names were Canoe camp, Portage Point, Rocky Mountain Portage, and Mountain House.

The rename to Boat Encampment (often not capitalised and/or with the definite article) appears to have been adopted in the 1830s.

By 1900, the place was also known as Big Bend, but this term also had a wider application.

The pass was also called Rocky Mountain Portage, Columbia Pass, or Boat Encampment Pass.

== Notable early visitors ==
1825: Governor George Simpson.

1827, 1828: Francis Ermatinger.

1828: David Douglas.

1838: Fathers Blanchet and Demers held the first mass on the mainland of what would become BC.

1845: Lieutenant Henry Warre made sketches during his travels.

1846, 1847: Paul Kane also made sketches. Paintings later developed from his drawings exaggerated the landscape.

== Ferry and bridge ==
At this point, the breadth of the Columbia was 55 metres (60 yd) and the adjacent Canoe mouth was 37 metres (40 yd). About 113 kilometres (70 mi) downstream were the dangerous Dalles des Morts rapids.

The ferry installed in 1900 no longer operated a few years later. A subsidized ferry was established in 1910 to connect the Big Bend with Tête Jaune via the Canoe River shore. The ferry, which could carry horses and wagons, existed at least until 1916.

The highway bridge was erected by 1936. Although completed in late 1939, the official opening ceremony for the highway was held at the Boat Encampment bridge in June 1940. By 1973, when the dam submerged the locality, the highway had fallen into general disuse. During 1970–71, an over-height loaded logging truck damaged the bridge bracing. Once repaired, warning portals were installed on the approaches.

== Images ==
- Former highway bridge, Boat Encampment, 1959.
- Former general store/BA gas bar, Boat Encampment, 1959.
