= Marl Creek Provincial Park =

Provincial park in British Columbia, Canada

- Location within British Columbia
- Interactive map of Marl Creek Provincial Park
- Location: British Columbia, Canada
- Nearest city: Golden, BC
- Coordinates: 51°30′22″N 117°12′07″W
- Area: 169 hectares (420 acres)
- Governing body: BC Parks
- Website: Official website

Marl Creek Provincial Park is a provincial park in British Columbia, Canada, located on the Trans-Canada Highway 25 kilometres (16 mi) north of Golden in the Rocky Mountain Trench.
