= Dalles des Morts =

Historical rapids in present-day British Columbia, Canada

Coordinates: 51°31′N 118°30′W

Dalles des Morts, also known as Death Rapids in English, was a famously violent stretch of the Columbia River upstream from Revelstoke, British Columbia, Canada, now submerged beneath the waters of Lake Revelstoke.

== History ==
=== 1817 ===
The rapids acquired their name after a dark series of events in 1817, when a crew of North West Company voyageurs lost their canoes and food during a traverse of the rapids and were forced to attempt the overland journey to Spokane House, with only one survivor being rescued by local native people after a harrowing survival ordeal, and a confession of cannibalistic survival:

Dalles des Morts [mis-spelled "Dalle de Mort" on Trutch's 1871 map of British Columbia.] The French form originated with NWC voyageurs in 1817, when seven men were wrecked here and all their food was lost. They began walking along the river hoping to reach Spokane House, the nearest establishment, over 300 miles (480 km) away. High water forced them up into the almost impenetrable forest. One by one they died, the survivors resorting to cannibalism. The last one was found by Indians on the shore of Upper Arrow lake and was taken to Kettle Falls, whence he was conducted to Spokane House. His story that he had killed his last companion in self defence was not believed, and he was dismissed from the NWC service, escaping more serious punishment owing to lack of evidence against him.

(from Douglas of the Fir: A Biography of David Douglas, Botanist, by A.G. Harvey; Harvard University Press, 1947, p.110) Source: Provincial Archives of BC "Place Names File" compiled 1945-1950 by A.G. Harvey from various sources, with subsequent additions

"In 1817 a party of seven Nor'westers was sent back to Spokane House [from Boat Encampment] because they were too ill to traverse the Rocky Mountains with the rest of the party. Their canoes and provisions were lost at the rapids here. Without supplies, they proceeded on foot very slowly, as they were weak and had only water for sustenance (there being no berries at this time of year). On the third day, the first man died and his remains were eventually eaten by the survivors. This continued until only two men were left, La Pierre and Dubois. Only La Pierre was found alive and he maintained that Dubois had attempted to kill him, but he had succeeded in overpowering and killing him in self defence. La Pierre's story was doubted, but he couldn't be convicted on the evidence." (from Adventures on the Columbia River by Ross Cox; London, 1831; vol 2, p.184-84) See also The Kootenays in Retrospect, vol 1: Columbia River Chronicles, Edward Affleck, editor, 1976.

=== 1838 ===
In 1838, another even greater tragedy befell the annual York Factory Express of the Hudson's Bay Company, an annual shipment of goods, books, personnel and mail between York Factory and Fort Vancouver, a tradition that had continued an earlier annual journey by North West Company staff from Fort George to Fort William on Lake Superior. The westbound journey was known as the Autumn Express because of the time of year of its schedule, and also as the Columbia Express due to its destination (referring as much to the Columbia Department as to the Columbia River). The 1838 Express had had a difficult journey from Fort Edmonton, and the party contained an unruly upper-crust greenhorn who had eloped with one of the daughters of HBC Governor Simpson, who during an ill-advised transit of the rapids panicked and jumped from the canoe with his wife in his arms, upsetting the canoe in the process and resulting in the death of all but one who had been aboard, including himself and his wife but sparing Matooskie, a native woman in the party who had lost her child in the journey via Athabasca Pass. She made her way to Fort of the Lakes, at the head of Upper Arrow, and was taken to Fort Colvile with her story. This happened in rapids below the Dalles des Morts, not in the Dalles per se.

=== 1860s ===
During the Big Bend Gold Rush from 1865 on, the Dalles des Morts marked the head of steamboat navigation on a route that stretched from Marcus, Washington Terr. via the Arrow Lakes to the port-boomtowns of La Porte and nearby Downie Creek, which lay at the foot of the rapids, and also at the foot of the portage to the goldfields on the creeks flanking the Goldstream River, which joined the Columbia only a few miles above the rapids. Prospecting occurred along lower Downie Creek and the settlement survived until the inundation, unlike Laporte which vanished after the goldrush. The first run by the steamer Forty-Nine was in 1865 but made it only as far as the Narrows due to heavy ice, but the next year the steamer braved the rapids of the Narrows and in 1866 began regular service from Marcus to La Porte for the duration of the gold rush. The other main route to the rush was via Pettipiece Pass from Seymour Arm on Shuswap Lake, another port town which sprang up at the end of the steamboat route from Savona's Ferry at the farther end of Kamloops Lake and accessed by a newly built but easy road from Cache Creek via the Semlin Valley to Savona's Ferry, today's town of Savona. From Kamloops Lake the route ran via the South Thompson River, Little Shuswap Lake, and the Little River. Still others came to the goldfields on the longer route around the Big Bend from the East Kootenay and the Wild Horse Creek Gold Rush and Montana.

== Name ==
The name was formally registered in English as Death Rapids on December 12, 1939, but rescinded on April 3, 1986, upon the inundation of the site by the reservoir. Joseph Trutch's 1870s map uses the mistaken "Dalle des Morts". A dalles is a term from French as used by the voyageurs in the Pacific Northwest, adapted from the usual meaning of dalle as a flagstone, or in other contexts as a gutter on a ship's deck or bridge for the purpose of draining excess water. The context of "river rapids" does not turn up in French dictionaries, but appears to be a local variation on the usual meanings, a pun on the staircase-like stones underneath some rapids and also on the rapidly draining narrow chutes that typify a "Dalles". In the case of Dalles des Morts, the pun carries the extra weight of "gravestone", as that is the usual meaning of the phrase in French.

The more famous "Dalles" in the Pacific Northwest is the namesake of The Dalles, Oregon, which was the site of the Grand Dalles de la Columbia and also the Petites Dalles or Little Dalles before the inundation of that portion of the Columbia.

== See also ==
- List of rapids of the Columbia River
