= Perry Creek (British Columbia) =

Coordinates: 49°35′59″N 115°52′51″W

Perry Creek is a creek located in the East Kootenay region of British Columbia. The creek was discovered in 1867 by Frank Perry. This creek has been mined for gold. Perry Creek has been mined by various methods, including hydraulicking, tunneling, steam shovel, wingdamming, and sniping.
