= Mica Creek =

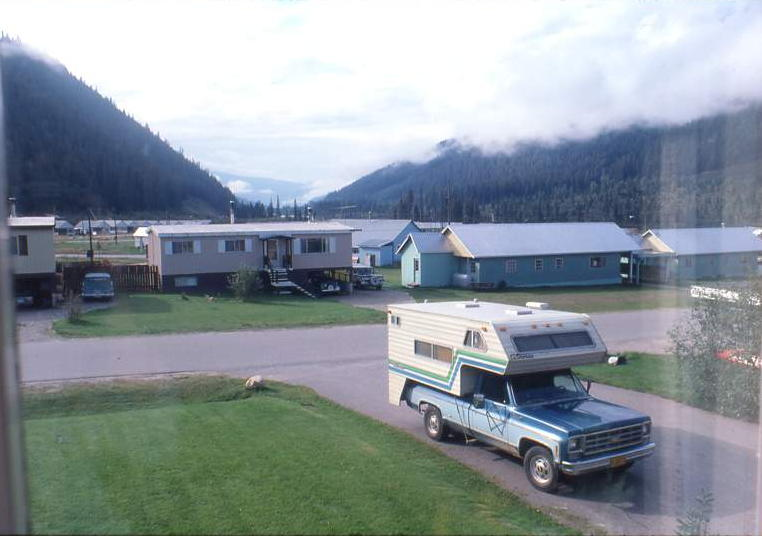
- Mica Creek, c. 1978

- Location of Mica Creek in British Columbia
- Coordinates: 52°00′00″N 118°34′00″W
- Country: Canada
- Province: British Columbia
- Time zone: UTC−07:00 (PT)
- Area codes: 250, 778

Mica Creek is a small village in British Columbia, Canada that was used as a base of operations for the construction of the Mica Dam hydroelectric project by BC Hydro in the 1960s and 1970s. It is located 148 km north of Revelstoke, British Columbia on Highway 23 and situated at the convergence of the Revelstoke Lake (the Columbia River) and a stream called Mica Creek. The village is effectively a relocation of Mica, which had been at the confluence of the Columbia and Mica Creek proper. The creek itself was named for the flakes of mica minerals which could be found floating in its waters. The Mica Creek area was one of the foci of the Big Bend Gold Rush of the 1860s.

The village of Mica Creek reached its peak population of approximately 4000 people around 1973, at the time of the opening of the Mica Dam. At that time there were quite a number of amenities including a school, church, ski lodge, community center, outdoor swimming pool, police station, fire hall, grocery store and post office. As the village reduced in population, these were gradually shut down; the high school closed its doors in 1978.

At the time of the construction of the Revelstoke Dam downriver in the early 1980s, the townsite of Mica Creek was moved to a higher position 500 meters inland from the Columbia River to accommodate flooding which created the dam's reservoir, Lake Revelstoke. Annual snowfall at Mica Creek averages 620 cm, usually reaching a depth of 1–2 meters by mid-winter, making it ones of the snowiest communities in Canada. Two heli-skiing operators are based at Mica, CMH Monashees and Mica Heli Guides.

As of October 2005, Mica Creek is no longer incorporated as a village, but most of the buildings of the old townsite are still maintained such as the recreation center (weight room, swimming pool, sauna, gymnasium) as well as a handful of houses, cottages, and gazebos. The old Mica Creek Ski Hill chalet still exists, although the lift has been removed.

Since 2011, BC Hydro has been upgrading the Mica Dam with the installation of 2 additional generator-turbine units. Consequently, the village currently houses about 400 workers, predominantly in the temporary Chief Kinbasket Lodge.

== See also ==
- Big Bend Gold Rush
- Mica Dam♙
