= Revelstoke Dam =

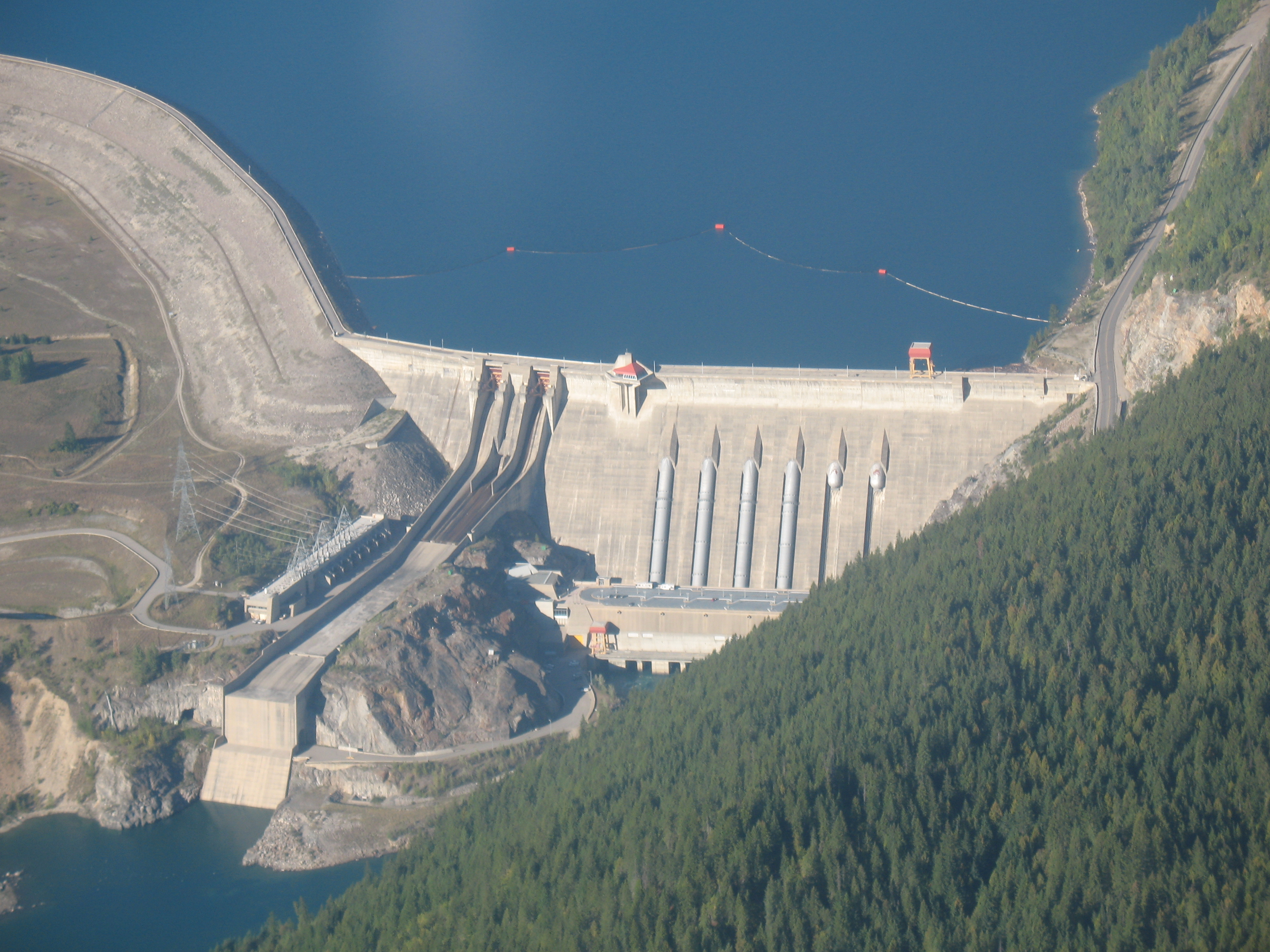

- Location within British Columbia
- Location: Revelstoke, Canada
- Coordinates: 51°02′58″N 118°11′38″W
- Opening date: 1984

Dam and spillways
- Impounds: Columbia River
- Height: 175 m (574 ft)

Reservoir
- Creates: Lake Revelstoke
- Total capacity: 1.5183 km^{3} (1,230,900 acre⋅ft)
- Surface area: 11,534 ha (28,501 acres) or 115 km^{2} (44 sq mi)

Power Station
- Operator: BC Hydro
- Commission date: 1984
- Turbines: 5
- Installed capacity: 2,480 MW
- Capacity factor: 36%
- Annual generation: 7,817 GWh

Revelstoke Dam, also known as Revelstoke Canyon Dam, is a hydroelectric dam (combined earthfill dam and gravity dam) spanning the Columbia River, 5 km (3.1 mi) north of Revelstoke, British Columbia, Canada. The powerhouse was completed in 1984 and has an installed capacity of 2480 MW. Four generating units were installed initially, with one additional unit (#5) having come online in 2011. The reservoir behind the dam is named Lake Revelstoke. The dam is operated by BC Hydro.

== History ==
Construction of Revelstoke Dam started in 1978, and was completed in 1983.

Areas inundated by the dam include the Dalles des Morts or "Death Rapids", which was the stretch of canyon just above the dam's location, and various small localities along the pre-inundation route of the Big Bend Highway, which was the original route of the Trans-Canada Highway until the building of its Rogers Pass section. Just below the dam was the location of La Porte, one of the boomtowns of the Big Bend Gold Rush and the head of river navigation via the Arrow Lakes and the Columbia River from Marcus, Washington.

== Revelstoke Dam Visitor Centre ==
The Revelstoke Dam Visitor Centre is located 5 km (3.1 mi) north of Revelstoke and is open seasonally. The centre features interactive exhibits, activities about the dam and hydroelectricity and a First Nations gallery opened in 2009, with exhibits about the art, history and culture of the Secwepemc (Shuswap), Okanagan and Ktunaxa peoples. Sinixt is not included in the exhibit, but the Revelstoke Dam is considered to fall within their territory. There is also a theatre, gift shop, and outdoor walkway across the top of the Powerhouse.

== Expansion ==
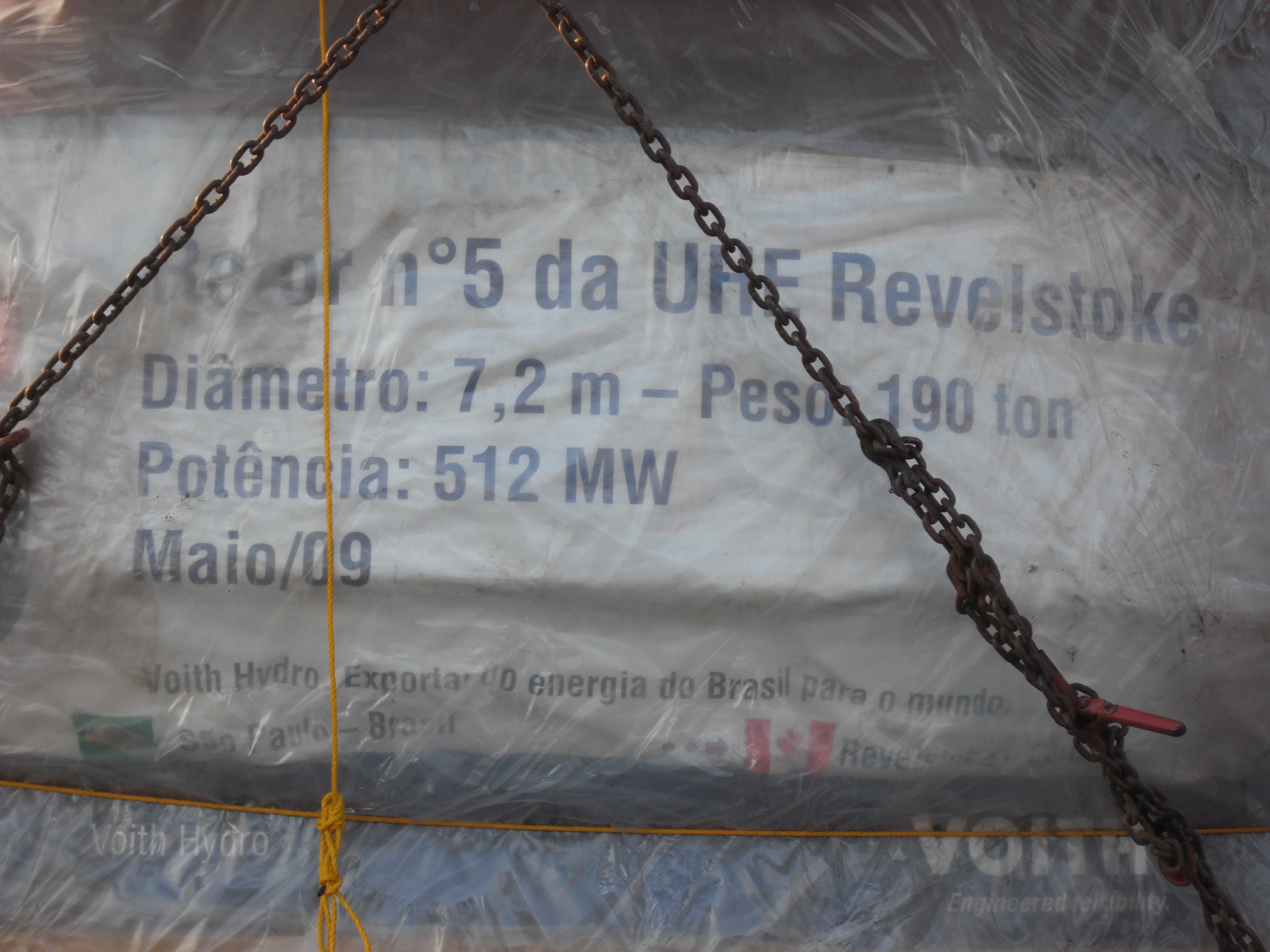
Shipping label of new generating unit at the dam.

BC Hydro completed an expansion to add a fifth unit. The unit went online in 2011 and added 500 MW capacity, bringing the total generating capacity of the dam to around 2480 MW. In 2009, the plant generated 6,361 GWh of electricity. By 2018, after the expansion, then plant generated 7,817 GWh of electricity. The dam was built to accommodate a sixth unit, also sized around 500 MW; a contingency plan to build the sixth unit is possible but not scheduled as of December 2018.

== See also ==
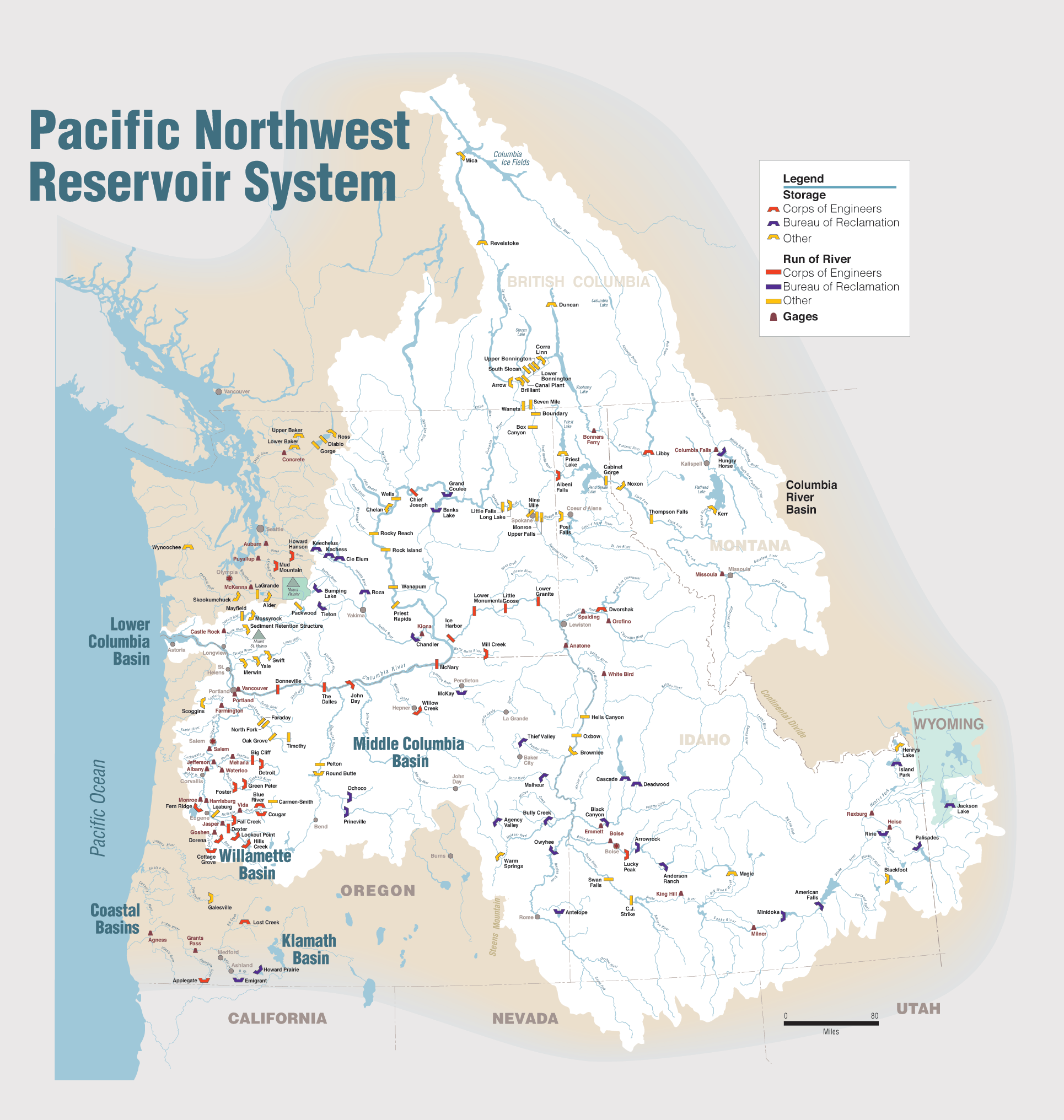
Pacific Northwest River System

- List of largest power stations in Canada
- List of generating stations in British Columbia
- List of dams in the Columbia River watershed
- Hydroelectric dams on the Columbia River
- Mica Dam
- Keenleyside Dam
