= Kinbasket Lake =

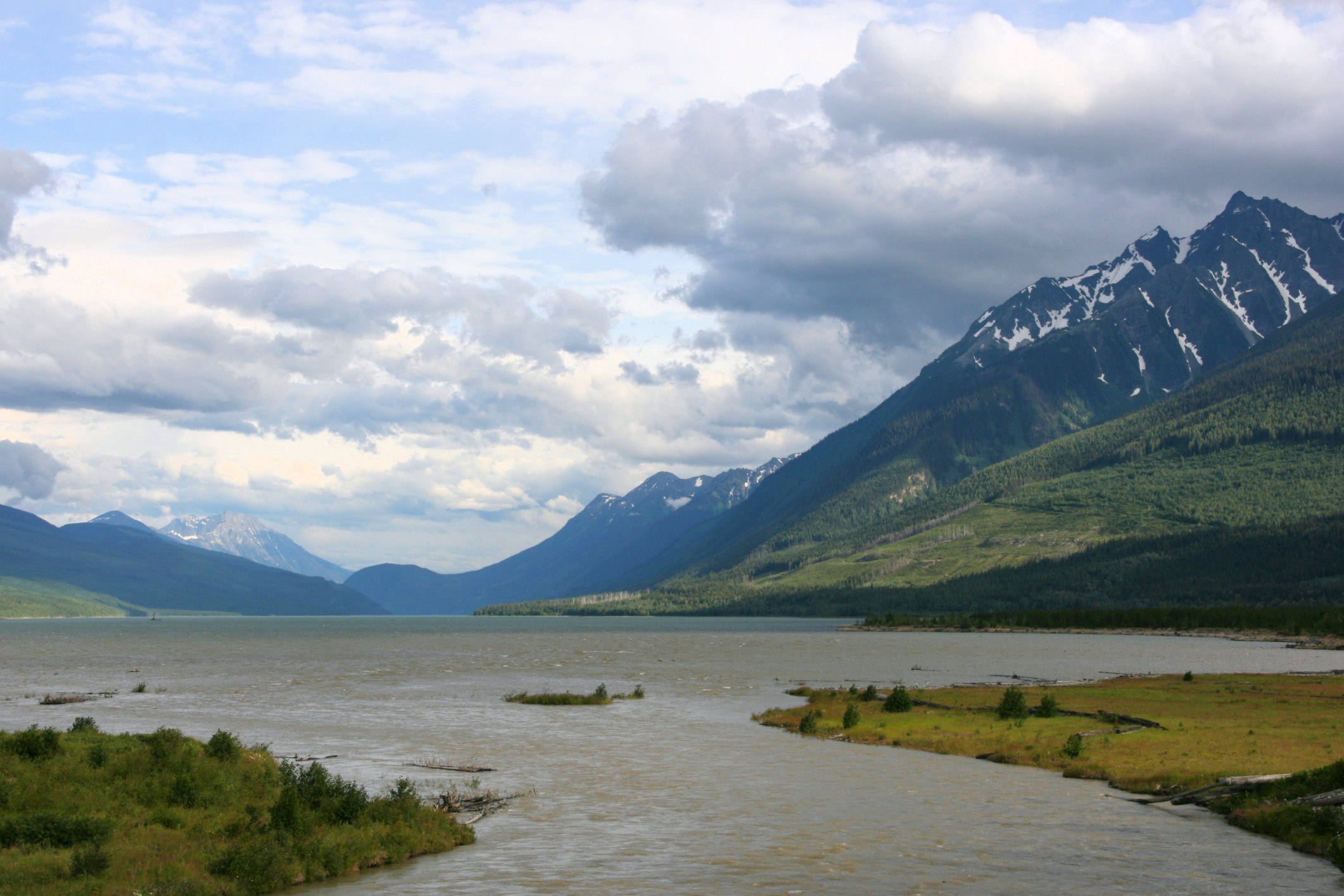
- Kinbasket Lake seen from its northern tip, near Valemount

- Location within British Columbia
- Location: British Columbia, from NW to SE of Mica Creek
- Coordinates: 52°08′N 118°27′W
- Type: reservoir
- Primary inflows: Columbia River, Canoe River
- Primary outflows: Columbia River
- Basin countries: Canada

Kinbasket Lake (or Kinbasket Reservoir) is a reservoir on the Columbia River in southeast British Columbia, north of the city of Revelstoke and the town of Golden. The reservoir was created by the construction of the Mica Dam. The lake includes two reaches, Columbia Reach (to the south) and Canoe Reach (to the north), referring to the river valleys flooded by the dam. To the north it almost reaches the town of Valemount in an impoundment of the Canoe River. To the south it reaches upstream the Columbia River towards the city of Golden.

The original, smaller Kinbasket Lake was named in 1866 after Kinbasket, a chief of the Shuswap people. The modern, large lake was created after the completion of the Mica Dam in 1973, and was called McNaughton Lake (after Andrew McNaughton) until 1980.

A number of small communities were inundated by the creation of Kinbasket Lake, and comprised a region known as the Big Bend Country, a subregion of the Columbia Country. Among these towns were Boat Encampment and Beavermouth. The Caribou Creek site offers a gravel boat launch.

== See also ==
- List of lakes of British Columbia
- Columbia River Treaty
