= La Porte, British Columbia =

La Porte was a boomtown in British Columbia, Canada, during the Big Bend Gold Rush. The site at the foot of the Dalles des Morts, or Death Rapids, was chosen as the location of a ferry and town on April 23, 1866, during the first voyage of the steamboat Forty-Nine up the Columbia River. The name reflected its role as the gateway to the mines.

By 1871, engineer Walter Moberly returned from a survey trip to report that a single resident remained at La Porte, by 1885 all of the houses were in ruins.
