= Lake Revelstoke =

- Location within British Columbia
- Location: British Columbia
- Coordinates: 51°17′30″N 118°16′50″W
- Type: reservoir
- Primary inflows: Columbia River, Goldstream River
- Primary outflows: Columbia River
- Basin countries: Canada
- Max. length: 130 km (81 mi)
- Max. width: 1.2 km (0.75 mi)
- Surface area: 10,125 ha (25,020 acres)
- Average depth: 46 m (151 ft)
- Surface elevation: 600 m (1,969 ft)
- Islands: None
- Settlements: Revelstoke

Lake Revelstoke or Revelstoke Lake or Revelstoke Lake Reservoir is an artificial lake on the Columbia River, north of the town of Revelstoke, British Columbia and south of Mica Creek. This lake is the reservoir formed by the Revelstoke Dam, which during its construction was also known as the Revelstoke Canyon Dam, inundating the Columbia's canyon in this area and the historic Dalles des Morts (Death Rapids) and some of the former gold diggings of the Big Bend Gold Rush. The dam's site is at what had been the head of river navigation by steamboat from Northport, Washington via the Arrow Lakes.

The lakes extends 130 km (81 mi) upstream to the tailrace of Mica Dam. Three-quarters of the flow through the Revelstoke Dam Powerhouse is regulated water release from Mica Dam, with the result that the reservoir regularly fluctuates by up to 4.5 m (15 ft).

== See also ==
- List of lakes of British Columbia
