= Mica Dam =

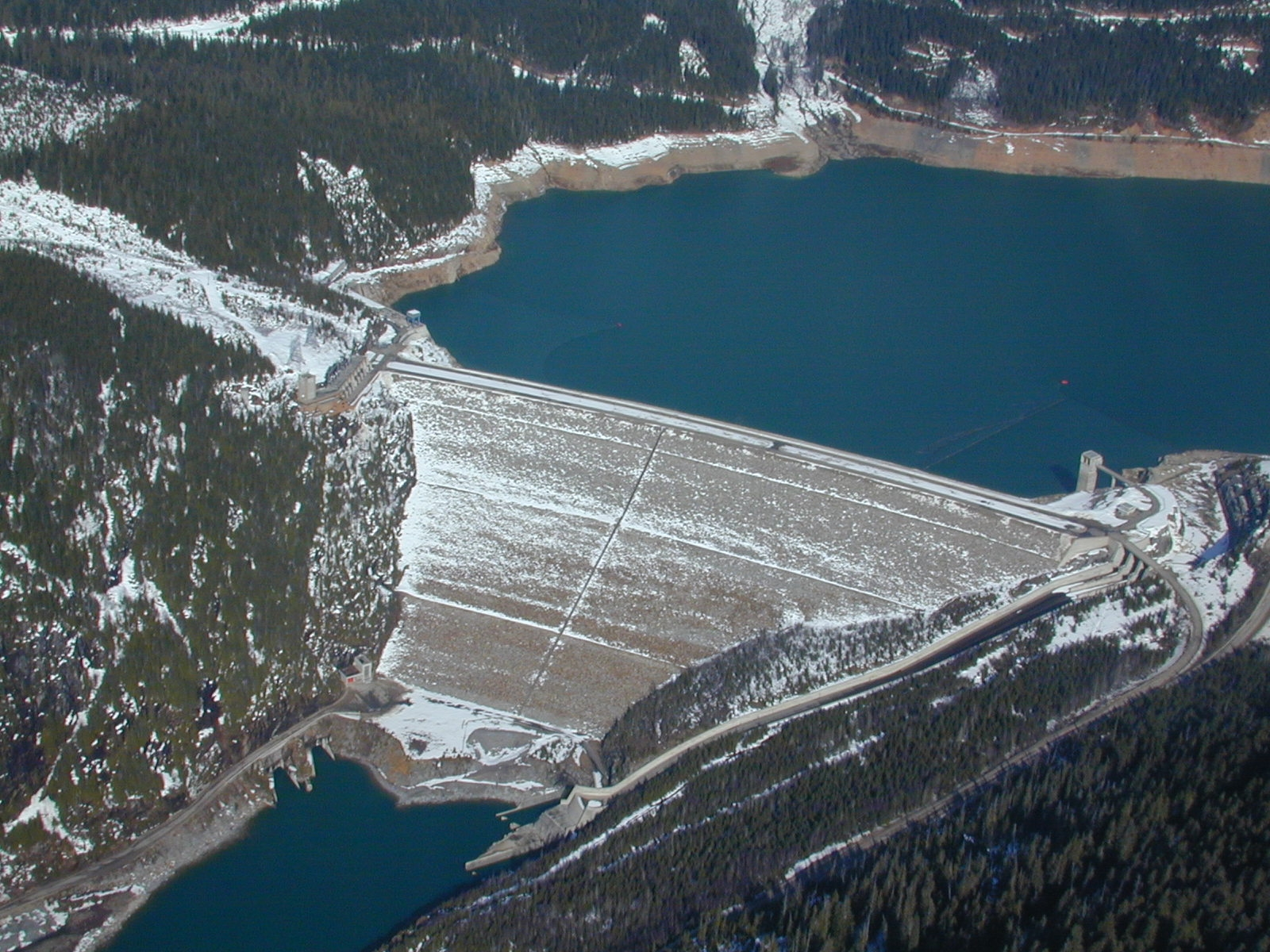
- Aerial view of the Mica Dam

- Location within British Columbia
- Location: Mica Creek, British Columbia, Canada
- Coordinates: 52°04′40″N 118°33′59″W
- Construction began: 1967
- Opening date: March 23, 1973
- Owner: BC Hydro

Dam and spillways
- Type of dam: Embankment dam
- Impounds: Columbia River
- Height: 240 m (787 ft)

Reservoir
- Creates: Kinbasket Lake
- Total capacity: 24.762 km^{3} (20,075,000 acre⋅ft)
- Surface area: 430 km^{2} (170 sq mi)

Power Station
- Commission date: 1976–1977
- Turbines: 6
- Installed capacity: 2,805 MW
- Capacity factor: 29.3%
- Annual generation: 7,200 GWh

Mica Dam is a hydroelectric embankment dam spanning the Columbia River 135 kilometres north of Revelstoke, British Columbia, Canada. It was built as one of three Canadian projects under the terms of the 1964 Columbia River Treaty and is operated by BC Hydro. Completed in 1973, the Mica powerhouse had an original generating capacity of 1,805 megawatts (MW). Mica Dam, named after the nearby settlement of Mica Creek and its associated stream, in turn named after the abundance of mica minerals in the area, is one of the largest earthfill dams in the world. The reservoir created by the dam is Kinbasket Lake. Water from the dam flows south directly into Revelstoke Lake, the reservoir for the Revelstoke Dam. Mica Dam is the tallest dam in Canada and second tallest in North America after the Chicoasén Dam in Mexico and it is the farthest upstream dam on the Columbia River. The dam's underground powerhouse was the second largest in the world at the time of its construction, and was the first 500 kV installation of sulphur hexafluoride (SF_{6}) insulated switchgear in the world.

== History ==
Mica Dam was constructed by BC Hydro as part of three projects, along with Duncan Dam and Arrow Dam, required under the Columbia River Treaty, ratified in 1964. Construction began in 1967, and was completed on March 23, 1973.

Mica Dam was operational on March 29, 1973. The dam was built to a height of 244 metres (801 ft) above bedrock, near the first location of the village Mica Creek. The dam operated with a 427 km^{2} (165 sq mi) reservoir containing 15 km^{3} (12 million acre-feet) of live storage and 24.8 km^{3} (20.1 million acre-feet) of total storage in McNaughton Lake, later renamed Kinbasket Lake in 1980.

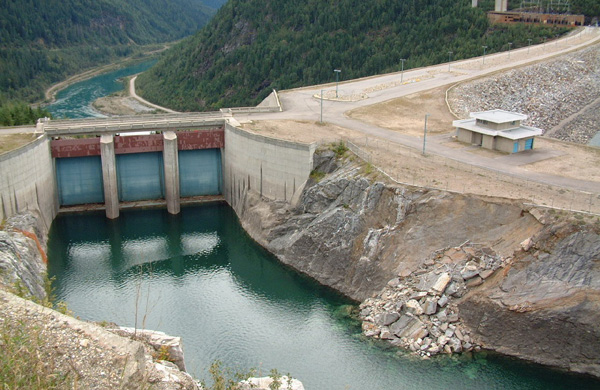
Mica Dam spillway

The underground powerhouse, begun in 1973, was built to be 54 metres (177 ft) high, 24 metres (79 ft) wide and 237 metres (778 ft) long. In 1976, the first two electrical generators were commissioned, and in 1977 two more were completed bringing the total capacity of the powerhouse to 1,805 MW. Another two 500 MW generators were added and became operational in 2014 and in 2015, giving a total generating capacity of 2,805 MW.

The Mica powerhouse delivers its power to Nicola Substation via a 500-kilovolt, 570-kilometre (350 mi) transmission line. A second power transmission line was built to the Meridian Substation near Port Moody, British Columbia, Canada.

The creation of Kinbasket Lake submerged parts of the Big Bend Country, a subregion of the Columbia Country. This included a number of small communities along the Big Bend Highway, and the eastern section of that route. Also, the Canadian Pacific Railway (CP) line ran along the Columbia Valley from Donald to Beavermouth. Consequently, west of Donald, CP diverted the line to a higher elevation, which required constructing four new bridges and a 336-metre (1,102 ft) tunnel.

Mica Dam was built to provide 8.6 km^{3} (7 million acre-feet) of water storage as outlined in the Columbia River Treaty, plus another 6.2 km^{3} (5 million acre-feet), referred to as "non-Treaty storage". Since 1977, BC Hydro and the Bonneville Power Administration (BPA) have made a series of long and short term agreements for using non-Treaty storage. Negotiations for a new long-term agreement began in 2011. If implemented, it would manage non-Treaty storage until 2024.

== Climate ==
Climate station located just south of Mica Dam at an elevation of 579.10 metres (1,899.9 ft).

Climate data for Mica Dam
Month	Jan	Feb	Mar	Apr	May	Jun	Jul	Aug	Sep	Oct	Nov	Dec	Year
Record high °C (°F)	7.5 (45.5)	11.0 (51.8)	12.8 (55.0)	23.5 (74.3)	32.5 (90.5)	35.6 (96.1)	36.1 (97.0)	37.8 (100.0)	29.5 (85.1)	20.5 (68.9)	14.4 (57.9)	7.7 (45.9)	37.8 (100.0)
Mean daily maximum °C (°F)	−2.6 (27.3)	−0.4 (31.3)	4.3 (39.7)	10.2 (50.4)	18.0 (64.4)	21.8 (71.2)	23.9 (75.0)	23.5 (74.3)	17.1 (62.8)	8.7 (47.7)	1.3 (34.3)	−2.6 (27.3)	10.3 (50.5)
Daily mean °C (°F)	−4.9 (23.2)	−3.4 (25.9)	0.5 (32.9)	5.0 (41.0)	10.9 (51.6)	14.8 (58.6)	16.7 (62.1)	16.2 (61.2)	11.4 (52.5)	5.3 (41.5)	−0.5 (31.1)	−4.5 (23.9)	5.6 (42.1)
Mean daily minimum °C (°F)	−7 (19)	−6.3 (20.7)	−3.4 (25.9)	−0.3 (31.5)	3.7 (38.7)	7.7 (45.9)	9.4 (48.9)	8.8 (47.8)	5.6 (42.1)	1.7 (35.1)	−2.3 (27.9)	−6.3 (20.7)	0.9 (33.6)
Record low °C (°F)	−33.9 (−29.0)	−28 (−18)	−23.3 (−9.9)	−11.5 (11.3)	−3.9 (25.0)	0.0 (32.0)	1.0 (33.8)	−0.5 (31.1)	−4.4 (24.1)	−13.5 (7.7)	−26 (−15)	−37.2 (−35.0)	−37.2 (−35.0)
Average precipitation mm (inches)	184.4 (7.26)	110.1 (4.33)	107.0 (4.21)	77.8 (3.06)	64.0 (2.52)	70.2 (2.76)	90.1 (3.55)	78.0 (3.07)	67.4 (2.65)	144.1 (5.67)	200.7 (7.90)	180.1 (7.09)	1,373.9 (54.09)
Average rainfall mm (inches)	30.5 (1.20)	26.6 (1.05)	59.0 (2.32)	73.1 (2.88)	64.0 (2.52)	70.2 (2.76)	90.1 (3.55)	78.0 (3.07)	67.4 (2.65)	137.0 (5.39)	98.9 (3.89)	25.8 (1.02)	820.5 (32.30)
Average snowfall cm (inches)	154.0 (60.6)	83.5 (32.9)	48.0 (18.9)	4.6 (1.8)	0.1 (0.0)	0.0 (0.0)	0.0 (0.0)	0.0 (0.0)	0.0 (0.0)	7.1 (2.8)	101.8 (40.1)	154.3 (60.7)	553.4 (217.9)
Source: Environment Canada

== Pumped storage ==
Kinbasket Lake above Mica Dam normally has unused capacity to store water and Revelstoke Lake below the dam has minimal storage capacity. A proposed pumped storage addition on the side of Mica Dam would pump water into Kinbasket Lake, which would later be used to generate power at Mica and Revelstoke dams. This project was discussed in 2017 as storage for intermittent power from wind turbines in the event that the John Horgan Dam was cancelled.

== See also ==
- List of largest power stations in Canada
- List of generating stations in British Columbia
- List of dams in the Columbia River watershed
- Hydroelectric dams on the Columbia River
- Revelstoke Dam
- Keenleyside Dam
