= Steamboats of the Arrow Lakes =

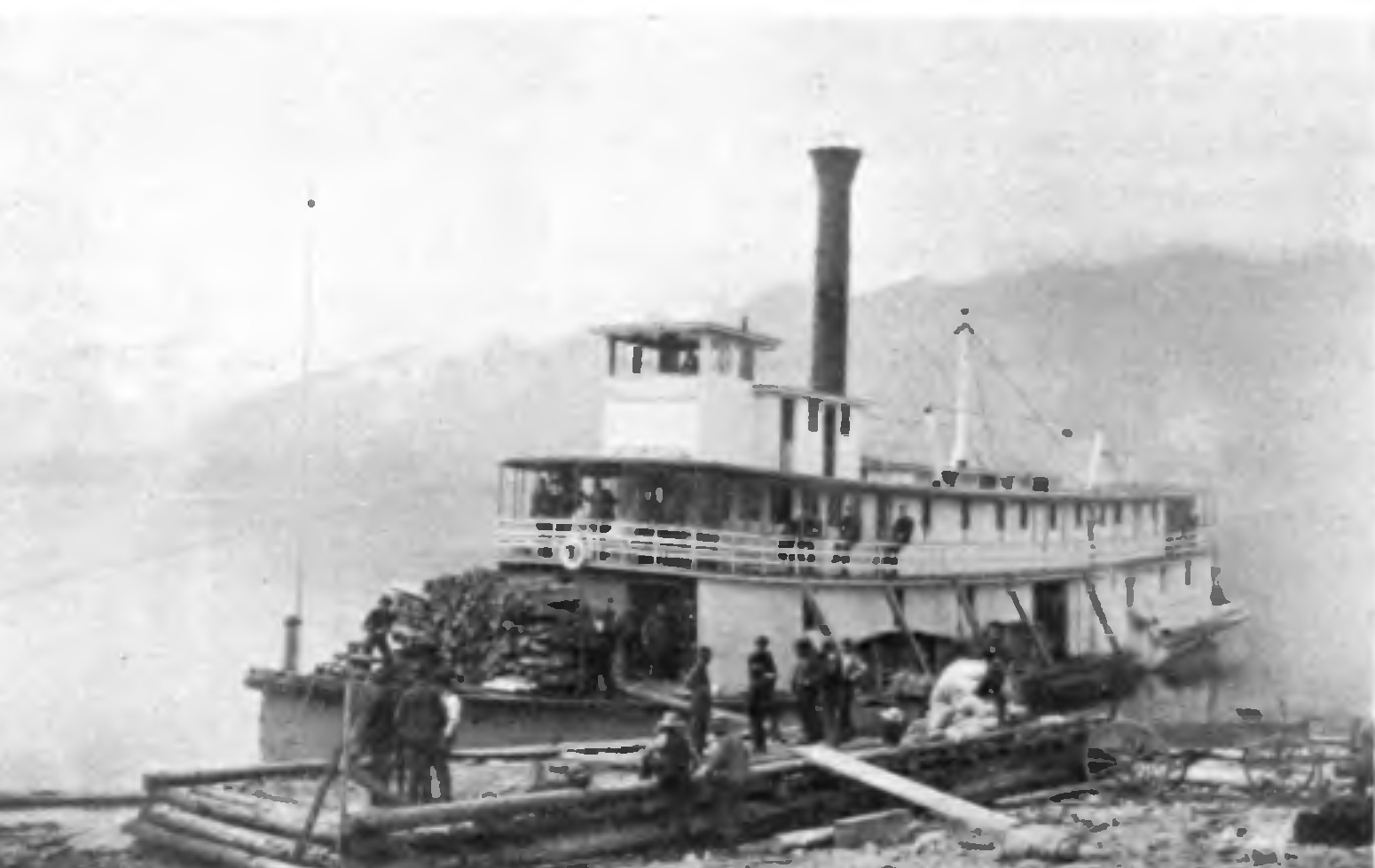
Sternwheeler Lytton sometime between 1890 and 1895, on Upper Arrow Lake

The era of steamboats on the Arrow Lakes and adjoining reaches of the Columbia River is long-gone but was an important part of the history of the West Kootenay and Columbia Country regions of British Columbia Canada. The Arrow Lakes are formed by the Columbia River in southeastern British Columbia. Steamboats were employed on both sides of the border in the upper reaches of the Columbia, linking port towns on either side of the border, and sometimes boats would be built in one country and operated in the other. Tributaries of the Columbia include the Kootenay River which rises in Canada, then flows south into the United States, then bends north again back into Canada, where it widens into Kootenay Lake. As with the Arrow Lakes, steamboats once operated on the Kootenay River and Kootenay Lake.

== Route ==
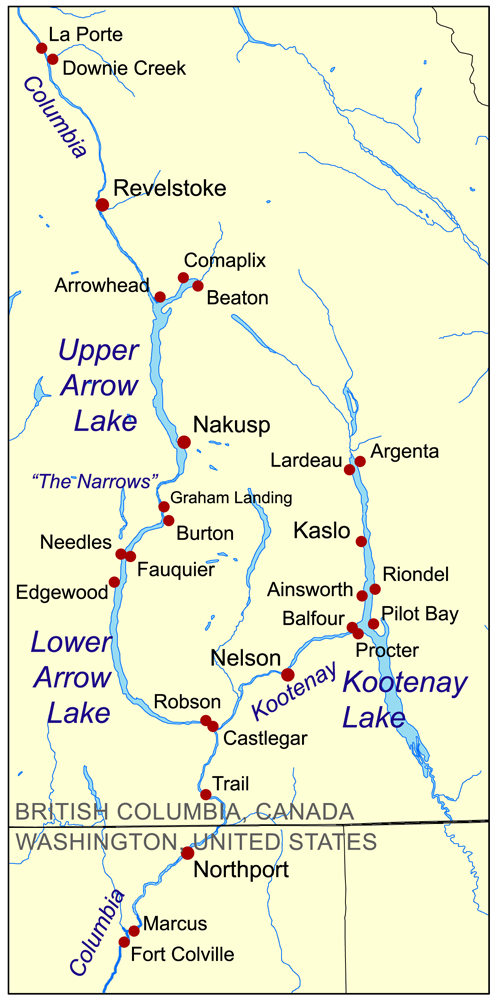

The Arrow Lakes route was accessible from the north, by a rail connection with the Canadian Pacific Railway (CPR) at Revelstoke, where the CPR crosses the Columbia River. The Arrow Lakes Route was also accessible from the south, at Northport, Washington, also on the Columbia River, where there was also a rail connection. The Columbia River crossed the border near Boundary, Washington, about 749 miles from the mouth of the Columbia, if traced along the river's route. Revelstoke was 937 miles from the mouth of the Columbia, so the total distance of the Arrow Lakes route was 182 miles from Revelstoke to Boundary.

Towns along the route, from south to north were Fort Colvile and Northport in Washington, and Trail in British Columbia. After Trail, the Columbia widened into Lower Arrow Lake. Towns and landings along Lower Arrow Lake were Robson, Edgewood, Needles, Fauquier, Burton and Graham Landing. North of Grand Landing, the lake narrowed and became more like a river. After this stretch, it widened into Upper Arrow Lake. Towns and landings along Upper Arrow Lake included Nakusp, Arrowhead and on a short northeasterly branch of the lake, Comaplix and Beaton. North of Arrowhead, the lake narrowed and became the Columbia River again, up to the next major town, which was Revelstoke.

== Initial steamboats placed on the route ==
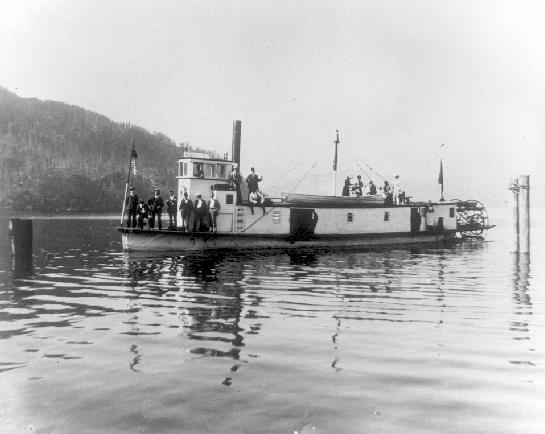
Marion somewhere in inland British Columbia ca 1890

The first steamboat on the route was the Forty-Nine, built to service a brief gold rush on the Big Bend of the Columbia River, attempting the run from Marcus, Washington Territory, just above Kettle Falls, to La Porte, one of the main boomtowns of the rush, which was sited at the foot of the infamous and also impassable Dalles des Morts or Death Rapids, which were at the head of river navigation but also just below the richest of the Big Bend's goldfields, on the Goldstream River which meets the Columbia just upstream. Another major goldfield, Downie Creek, joined the Columbia just below the rapids and was the site of the boomtown, another port of call on the run. When the gold rush ended, Forty-Nine was withdrawn for lack of clientele, and the captain gave free passage out of the Big Bend area for those who could not afford passage. After that, the small steam launch Alpha ran supplies up to Revelstoke (then called Farwell) where the CPR was building a crossing over the Columbia River for its transcontinental line. In 1885, a much larger vessel, the sternwheeler Kootenai, was built at Little Dalles at Northport, for the CPR, but grounded in September of that year, and was laid up for a number of years afterwards. After that, three businessmen formed the Columbia Transportation Company and put SS Dispatch on the Arrow Lakes route. The Dispatch (sometimes spelled "Despatch") was a clunky-looking catamaran, which first ran on August 9, 1888. Her owners made enough money from her operations to buy the Marion, which had been operating above the Big Bend. She was shipped over and launched at Revelstoke.

The owners of the Columbia Transportation Company brought in some bigger businessmen, J.A. Mara, Frank S. Barnard and Captain John Irving, who formed the Columbia River and Kootenay Steam Navigation Company on January 21, 1890, with a capital of $100,000. In 1889 and 1890, the new firm purchased the idle Kootenai for $10,000 and built and launched the Lytton at Revelstoke, which was ready for service in July 1890. The first trip taken by the Lytton on July 2, 1890, was transporting rails and other track-building supplies south through the Arrow Lakes to Sproat's Landing, where the Kootenay River flowed into the Columbia, for a railroad that the CPR was building from the landing to Nelson on Kootenay Lake. The trip was 150 miles each way, and Lytton averaged 12 1/3 miles an hour downstream and 11 miles an hour upstream, including stops for wooding up and minor repairs.

By August 1890, American interests had completed a railroad, called the Spokane Falls and Northern, from Spokane Falls (later simply Spokane) to Little Dalles, Washington (Northport). Lytton, Kootenai and the Arrow Lakes route formed a link between the northern CPR railhead at Revelstoke the Arrow Lake to the southern railhead at Little Dalles.

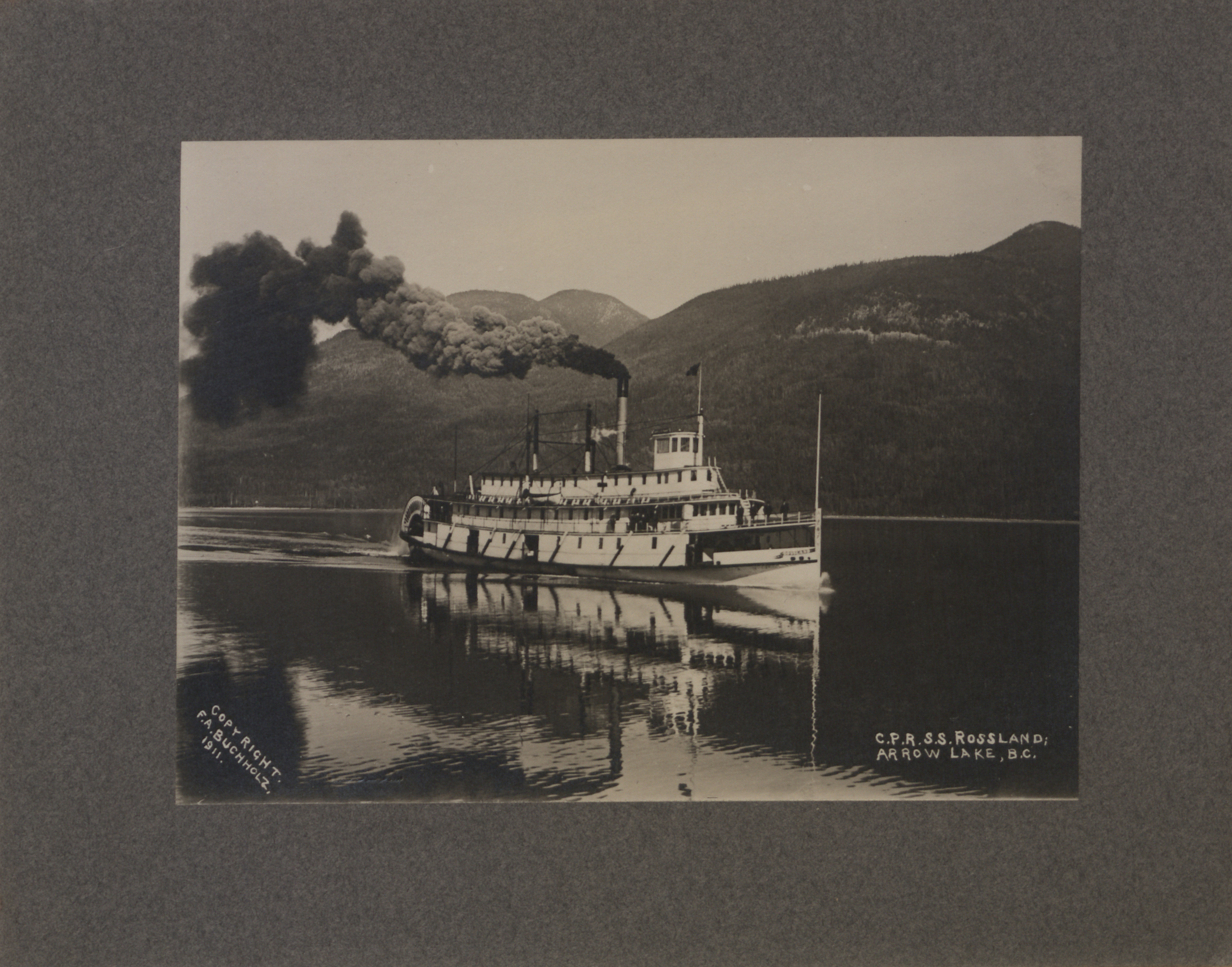
CPR SS Rossland, Arrow Lake, 1911

== Expansion of the fleet ==
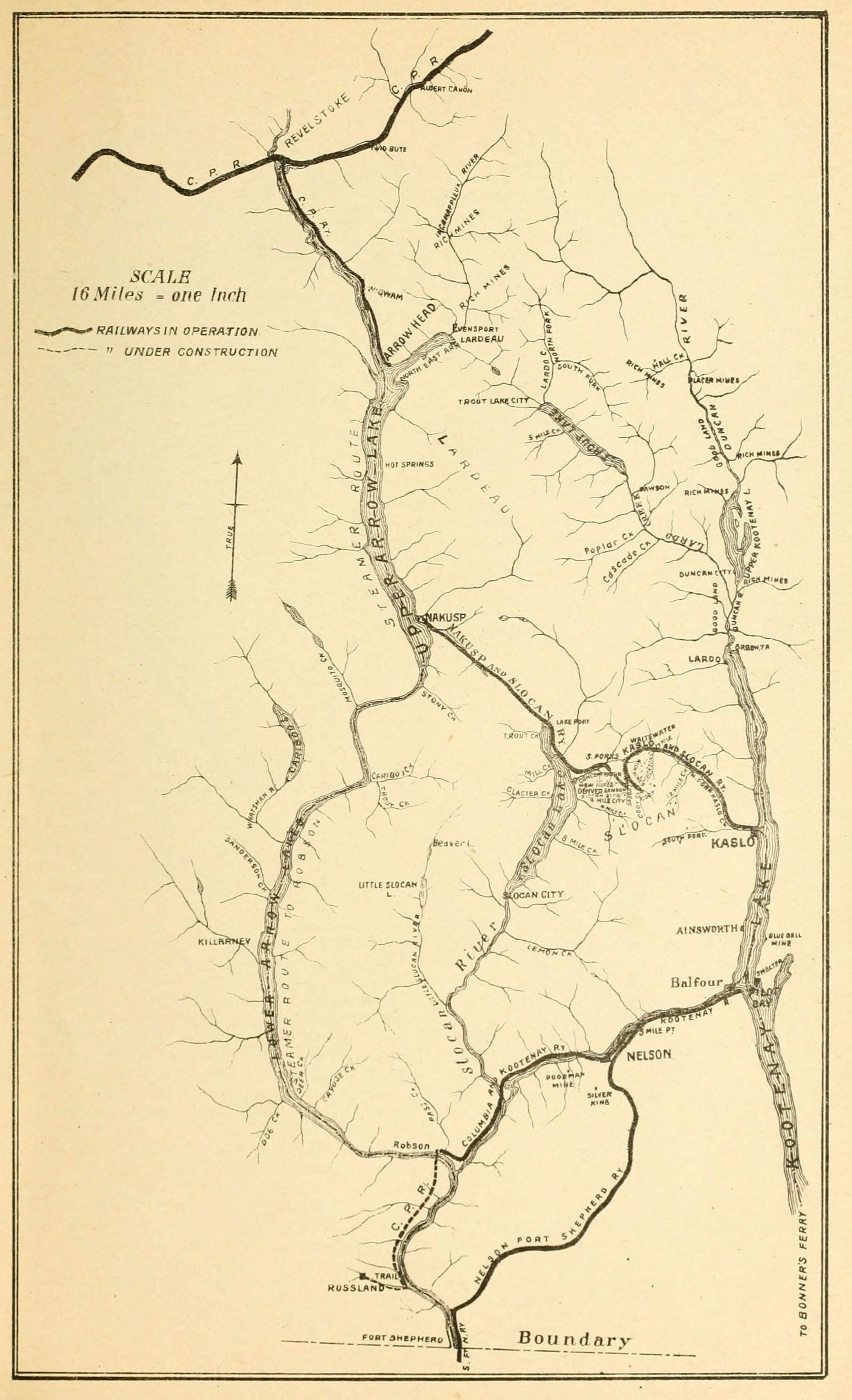
Arrow and Kootenay Lakes, 1895 map showing steamer routes, rail lines completed or under construction, and mining claims and areas

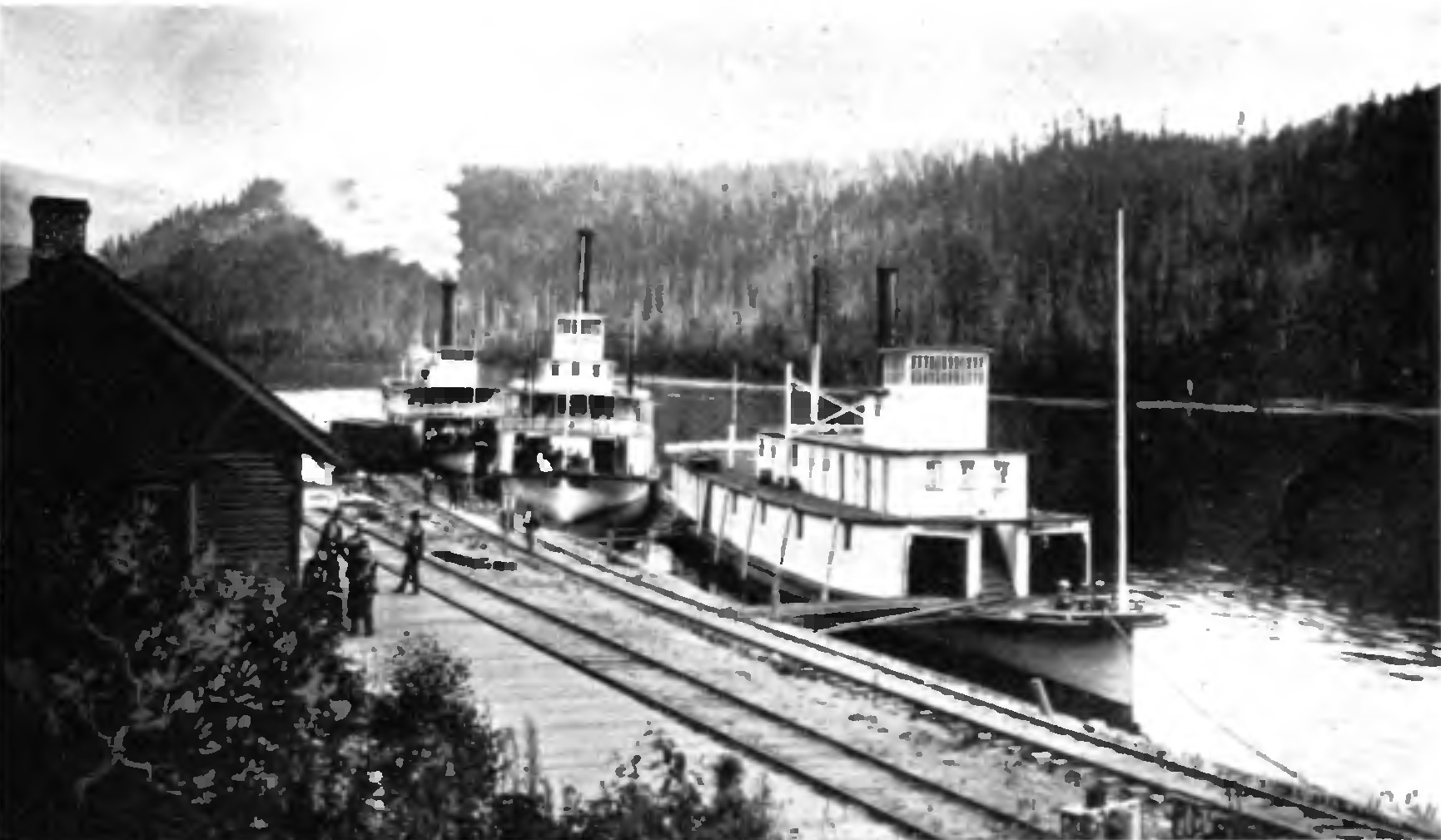
Lytton (in distance), Columbia (center), and Kootenai at Robson, BC, sometime between 1890 and 1894

After the successful 1890 season, the Columbia & Kootenay Steam Navigation Company decided to expand the fleet by adding a new sternwheeler, Columbia, built at Little Dalles, and launched in 1891, at price of $75,000. She remained under American registry. Once Columbia was in service, C&KSN was able to run two roundtrip boats weekly from Revelstoke to Little Dalles. The critical nature of the Arrow Lakes steamboat route can be judged by the fact that when the steamboats were not running, mail from Revelstoke to Nelson, on Kootenay Lake, took 10 to 14 days, as opposed to the two days during the summer steamboat season.

C&KSN also brought up from Oregon one of the best steamboat captains on the Columbia River, James W. Troup, to manage its operations on Arrow and Kootenay lakes. Troup had to deal with a number of challenges, including irregular schedules, and ice and low water blocking operations. At one point, the water level, apparently in the narrows between upper and lower Arrow Lakes, was so low that only the small Dispatch and Marion could make the run between the lakes. Troup built SS Illecillewaet at Revelstoke, launched October 30, 1892, and "designed to float on dew". She was small, and apparently ugly, but was a big improvement over Dispatch, and could operate in low water when no other boat could.

In 1893, a rail extension was built from Arrowhead to a junction with the CPR mainline at Revelstoke. Boats no longer needed to steam up the shallow waters of the Columbia between the north end of Upper Arrow Lake and Revelstoke, and Arrowhead now became the effective northern head of navigation.

Lytton was driven ashore by a storm on July 26, 1896, near Nakusp, and had to be withdrawn from service for emergency repair work there. On August 2, 1894, Columbia was destroyed by fire just north of the international border. This took out both of the C&KSN's passenger steamers, leaving only Illecillewaet and Kootenai moving the freight business, which was mostly related to rail construction. Troup needed a replacement for Columbia right way, so he brought in the Bulger family, experienced steamboat builders from Portland, Oregon, to run the shipyards at Nakusp and at Nelson, and to build Columbia's replacement.

On July 1, 1895, the new sternwheeler, Nakusp, was launched from the shipyard at the city of the same name. This vessel was the largest yet seen on the Arrow Lakes, 1,034 tons, almost twice the tonnage of Columbia. She was luxurious in a way other vessels never had been.

== List of vessels ==
The following steamboats and related vessels operated on these lakes:

Steamboats and other vessels on the Arrow Lakes, British Columbia
Name	Type	Year built	Where Built	Owners	Builder	Gross Tons	Reg. Tons	Length	Beam	Depth	Engines	Disposition
Forty-Nine	sternwheeler	1865	Colville Landing, WA	Leonard White	Leonard White and C.W. Briggs	219		114'	20'	5'	12" by 48"	little used after 1870
Alpha	steam launch	1882	Hong Kong									unknown
Dispatch	sternwheeler	1888	Revelstoke	Columbia Transportation Co.		37	23	54'	22'	4.5'	8"x24"	Last used as snag boat, dismantled 1893, engines to Illecillewaet.
Marion	sternwheeler	circa 1888	Golden, BC	Columbia Trans. Co.	Alexander Watson	15	9	61'	10.3'	3.6'	5.5" by 8"	sank on Kootenay Lake in 1901
Lytton	sternwheeler	1890	Revelstoke	C&KSN Co.	Alexander Watson	452	285	131'	25.5'	4.8'	16'x62"	Dismantled 1902 or 1904
Kootenai	sternwheeler	1885	Little Dalles	Henderson & McCartney	Paquet & Smith/E.G.Thomason	371	269	139'	22'	5'	14"x60"	Grounded and dismantled 1895
Columbia	sternwheeler	1891	Little Dalles, WA	Alexander Watson/Joseph Paquet	C&KSN Co.	534	378	153'	28'	6.3'	18"x72"	Burned, 1894, total loss
Illecillewaet	sternwheel scow	1892	Revelstoke	C&KSN Co.	Alexander Watson	98	62	78'	15'	4'	8"x24" (from Dispatch)	Sold for barge use, 1902
Nakusp	sternwheeler	1895	Nakusp, BC	C&KSN	Thomas J. Bulger	1083	832	171'	33.5'	6.3'	20"x72"	Destroyed by fire at dock at Arrowhead, BC, 23 Dec 1897
Trail	sternwheeler	1896	Nakusp, BC	C&KSN	Thomas J. Bulger	663	418	165'	31	4.9'	14" by 60"	destroyed by fire at Robson West, BC, June 1900
Columbia	steam tug	1896	Nakusp, BC	C&KSN	Thomas J. Bulger	50	34	77'	14.5'	6.4'	9" / 18" by 12"	In service until 1947, sold 1948, later disposition unknown
Kootenay	sternwheeler	1897	Nakusp, BC	Canadian Pacific Railway	Thomas J. Bulger	1117	732	184'	33	6.2'	18" by 72"	Used as houseboat after about 1920, eventually abandoned below Nakusp.
Rossland	sternwheeler	1897	Nakusp, BC	C.P.R.	Thomas J. Bulger	884	532	183'	29'	7'	22" by 96"	sank 1917, raised, but proved to be unsalvageable, and sold for use as landing barge.
Minto	sternwheeler	1898	Nakusp, BC	C.P.R.	J. M. Bulger	830	522	162'	30'	5.1'	16" by 72"	abandoned on beach 1955, fittings and sternwheel stripped, deliberately burned August 1, 1968, after restoration efforts failed.
Revelstoke	sternwheeler	1902	Nakusp, BC	Columbia River Steamship Co.		309	179	127'	22.7'	4.3'	12" by 60"	Destroyed by fire at Comaplix, April 1915, possibly arson.
Whatshan	steam tug	1909	Nakusp, BC	C.P.R.		106	72	90'	19'	8.1'	12" / 26" by 18"	Out of service 1919, scrapped 1920
Bonnington	sternwheeler	1911	Nakusp, BC	C.P.R.	J. M. Bulger	1700	1010	203'	39	7.5'	16"/ 34" by 96"	Dismantled 1950s
Nipigonian	motor launch (steel hull)	1929	Penetang, ON			10	7	40'	9.5'	4.8'	gasoline	Only used from February 1 to late April 1948
Widget	diesel tug		Vancouver, BC		Ivan Horie	9	6	36.5'	9.5'	4.8	diesel	
Columbia	motor pass. tug	1928	Vancouver, BC	C.P.R.		22	15	50'	11.4	5.6'	diesel	

== See also ==
- Moyie (sternwheeler)
- List of ships in British Columbia
- Steamboats of the upper Columbia and Kootenay Rivers

== Notes ==
The Columbia was bought by the Waldie lumber Co. and refitted from steam to a Vivian Diesel in 1948
