= SS Columbia (1920) =

History

Canada
- Name: Columbia
- Owner: Canadian Pacific Railway
- Route: Lower Arrow Lake
- Builder: Nakusp
- Cost: CAD$26 500
- Launched: November 4, 1920
- Completed: January 1921
- Maiden voyage: 1920
- In service: 1920-1948
- Out of service: 1948
- Refit: August 1937
- Fate: Buried

General characteristics
- Class & type: Steam tug
- Length: 80.1 feet (24.4 m)
- Beam: 15.4 feet (4.7 m)
- Speed: 11 miles per hour (18 km per hour)
- Capacity: 34

SS Columbia was a Canadian Pacific Railway passenger and freight steam tug built in 1920. She provided a winter service on Lower Arrow Lake in British Columbia, Canada from 1921 to 1948.

== Construction ==
Columbia was built at Nakusp, British Columbia to replace the tugs SS Whatshan and the earlier Columbia of 1896. She was the first boat designed specially for winter service on the Lower Arrow Lake, which was required because SS Minto was restricted to service north of Burton, British Columbia. Columbia had a small, enclosed passenger cabin and a dining room. She was an attractive vessel and was licensed to carry 34 passengers. Her machinery had come from the Columbia of 1896 and allowed a speed of 11 miles per hour.

By September 1920, Columbia was completed just enough to get through the Burton narrows before the water dropped too low in the winter. She was launched from Nakusp on November 4 and finishing touches were added at West Robson and she was completed in January 1921.

== Service ==
Because the winter of 1921 was mild, Columbia did not begin service until January 1922. She made two round trips per week, going northbound on Tuesdays and Fridays and southbound on Wednesdays and Saturdays between West Robson and Needles, British Columbia.

Complaints arose during the first months because Columbia was unable to break the ice on the lake and Edgewood Lumber Co's tug Elco had to help her to the Edgewood wharf on one occasion. As a result, CPR built a smaller barge and ice breaker for Columbia.

In February 1929, Columbia broke her propeller in heavy ice and a week later, service was suspended for nine days when her propeller and barge were damaged by ice. Residents complained about the poor mail service and unreliability, often comparing her to the earlier, more powerful SS Whatshan.

In 1930, her propeller broke at Robson again. At Syringa Creek, eight men from Fairview Shipyards in Nelson, British Columbia brought two trucks and trailers to help her out of the ice. They cleared a channel with dynamite in four days and got her to shore, jacked her up, and changed the propeller. Once released, she got stuck in an ice channel 200 feet away from where she was originally stopped.

In August 1937, she got a new boiler and steampipe. During the trial run to Broadwater, she had a hard time keeping up steam and her smoke stack was too short meaning she couldn't get enough draft and had to have a taller one installed.

== Retirement ==
Columbia was retired in 1948 with a worn hull. She was temporarily replaced by SS Widget until MV Surfco, which had operated along Vancouver Island, could enter service. Surfco was small and unsuited to handling freight.

Columbia was rested at Balfour Bay and both were covered in the 1960s by fill from the construction of the Hugh Keenleyside Dam.
