= SS Whatshan =

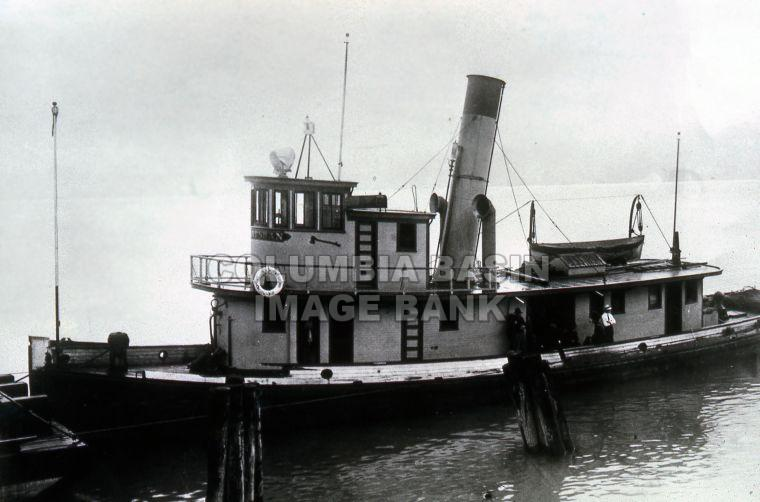
- SS Whatshan on the Arrow Lakes ca. 1915

History

Canada
- Name: Whatshan
- Owner: Canadian Pacific Railway
- Route: Lower Arrow Lakes
- Builder: Nakusp shipyard
- Launched: 1909
- In service: 1909
- Out of service: 1919
- Fate: Dismantled

General characteristics
- Class & type: Steam tug
- Tonnage: 106 gross, 72 registered
- Length: 90 feet (27 m)
- Beam: 19 feet (5.8 m)
- Depth: 8.1 feet (2.5 m)

SS Whatshan was a steam tug owned by the Canadian Pacific Railway that operated on the Lower Arrow Lakes in British Columbia, Canada from 1909 to 1919. Although she was small, Whatshan proved to be the most suited to the Lower Arrow Lake run of all the tugs on the route from 1909 to 1961 because she had enough power to keep the channel open in bad weather when other ships became stranded in ice.

== Service ==
Starting in 1909, Whatshan pushed barges up and down the Arrow Lakes. In June 1915, the car barge service between the cities Arrowhead and Nakusp, British Columbia ended and CPR put Whatsan on the Lower Arrow Lakes winter service. She replaced the tug Yale, which had been leased from the Yale Columbia Lumber Co. in 1909. In 1913, her captain was J. Dougal and her chief engineer was D. Campbell.

An additional passenger cabin was added to the stern and Whatshan began to run three times a week between Robson and Edgewood in the extreme conditions of January 1916. On the up-run on Mondays, Wednesdays, and Fridays, she brought mail to communities such as Deer Park, Renata, and Edgewood; on the down-run on Tuesdays, Thursdays, and Saturdays, she took mail out. However, due to the ice jam below Burton in January, the channel between Edgewood and Needles closed until the end of March. Whatshan could no longer break the ice into the wharf at Robson and goods had to be unloaded midstream on the ice and packed to shore. A week later, her propeller broke 10 miles north of Robson and she was stranded for 24 hours.

During the following years, Whatshan was employed for many purposes and enjoyed a varied career. She spent February transporting prisoners from the Edgewood Internment Camp until service resumed on March 29, when she succeeded in breaking through from Edgewood to Needles. In June 1916, she towed logs for the Glaspie Brothers from Eagle Bay to Nakusp for the construction of the Quance mill. She was also used for the temporary barge service between Nakusp and Arrowhead at this time. In 1917, she made regular trips from January to April, as well as special runs for the Mountain Chief mine in Renata. These included trips in 1918 for cordwood and ore from the mine. During this time, Whatshan was also relieving the steam tug Columbia, which was being refitted and repaired at the Nakusp shipyard. In 1919, Whatshan hauled railway ties to Robson and Nakusp, and was used when SS Minto was stuck in ice at Burton in December. However, this service was cut to twice a week and did not resume the regular three trips until January. This was Whatshan's last use.

== Retirement ==
Whatshan was retired in 1919. In July 1920, she was put up on the Nakusp shipyard ways and her machinery and boiler were shipped to Okanagan Landing for reuse. In June 1921, her remains were towed to Arrowhead by the tug Yale. Her final resting place was near Deep Water Landing at Beaton. Her engines were later used in a new tug built at Okanagan Landing, Kelowna. Whatshan was replaced by the second Columbia, built in 1920.
