= SS Dispatch =

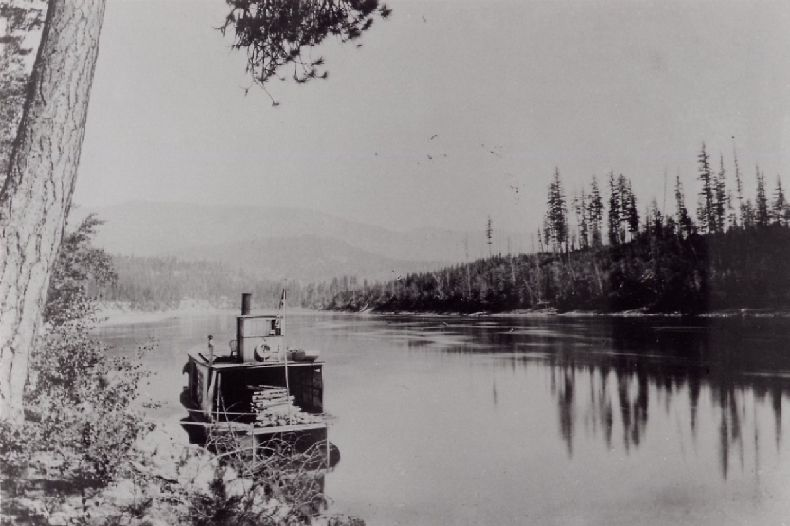
- SS Dispatch at Sproat's Landing, British Columbia

History

Canada
- Name: Dispatch
- Owner: Columbia Transportation Company
- Route: Columbia River
- Launched: August 9, 1888
- Maiden voyage: August 9, 1888
- In service: 1888–1893
- Out of service: 1893
- Fate: Dismantled

General characteristics
- Class & type: Sternwheeler
- Tonnage: 37 gross, 23 registered
- Length: 54 feet (16 m)
- Beam: 20 feet (6.1 m)
- Depth: 4.5 feet (1.4 m)

SS Dispatch was a small sternwheeler that operated from 1888 to 1893 on the Columbia River and Arrow Lakes in British Columbia, Canada. She is sometimes referred to as Despatch, although sources from the time period during which she operated primarily used the name Dispatch. Dispatch was the first ship to be built for regular steamboat service on the lower Columbia and the beginning of a long line of steamships that opened the area for development.

== Construction ==
In 1888, regular steamship service commenced on the lower Columbia after entrepreneurs J. Frederick Hume, William Cowan, and Robert Sanderson formed the Columbia Transportation Company. The first ship, Dispatch, was built at Revelstoke, British Columbia. She was an unattractive, a twin-hulled, asymmetrical catamaran vessel with a boxy wood cabin and a wheelhouse on top. Nonetheless, she was functional, if not comfortable, and enabled early settlers to develop the region.

== Early years ==
Dispatch was launched on August 9, 1888 under Captain Sanderson, journeying from Revelstoke to Sproat's Landing in two days. It soon became apparent that her design limited her speed and hauling capacity. As well, her owners had lacked the funds to freight on her second engine, so during her first runs, the crew and passengers had to climb onto the paddle wheel and help turn it when the single engine stopped at the end of a stroke and was unable to rotate the wheel. Passengers were also expected to gather wood for fuel. Soon after, SS Marion entered service, but the two ships could only provide primitive service.

In July, 1889, George Mercer Dawson from the Geological Survey of Canada, a geologist responsible for early surveys of areas of western Canada, traveled up the Columbia River in Dispatch. He described the service in his diary as “primitive steamboating” and wrote that the accommodations consisted of “dirty bunks, a stove with pantry, a Chinaman [cook and steward]…and a table". Also present on deck were cordwood for fuel, sacks of ore, and one chair aft of the wheelhouse for a passenger wishing to be outside.

== Late years ==
Mining in the West Kootenays produced busy traffic and it was apparent that Dispatch and Marion were not sufficient. Although Dispatch had many flaws, she proved the necessity of steamship service and justified investments for later ships, such as Lytton and Columbia, built in 1889 and 1891, respectively. This allowed the ships to provide two rounds trips a week between Revelstoke and Little Dalles, freeing up Kootenai and Dispatch for freight and extra business. In addition, Dispatch was useful for pulling snags and emergencies.

By 1892, a replacement for Dispatch was required. As the major investment during her construction had been the boiler and engines, scrapping the hulls and cabin was not a big loss. Her two 8 feet (2.4 m) by 24 feet (7.3 m) engines were put into her replacement, SS Illecillewaet. Dispatch was dismantled in 1893.

Footnote: Dispatch was a paddlesteamer, and should be termed PS, not SS. In North America, a paddlesteamer was presumed to be sternwheel unless specified as sidewheel; the reverse distinction applied elsewhere in the world.
