= SS Illecillewaet =

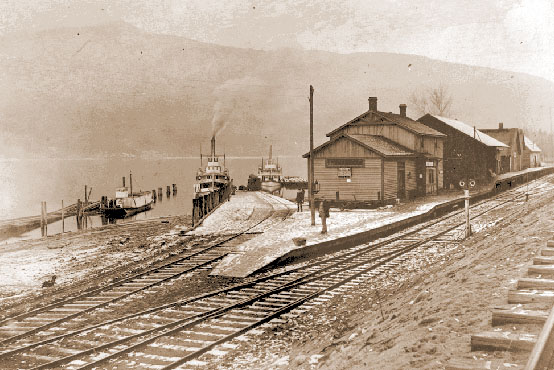
- SS Illecillewaet, SS Rossland and SS Minto at the Dock in Nakusp, 1905

History

Canada
- Name: Illecillewaet
- Owner: Canadian Pacific Railway, Columbia and Kootenay Steam Navigation Company
- Port of registry: 100683
- Route: Arrow Lakes
- Builder: James William Troup, Alex Watson
- Launched: October 30, 1892
- Maiden voyage: October 30, 1892
- In service: 1892-1902
- Out of service: 1902
- Reclassified: 1902
- Fate: Dismantled

General characteristics
- Class & type: Sternwheeler
- Tonnage: 97.92 gross, 61.69 registered
- Length: 78 feet (24 m)
- Beam: 15 feet (4.6 m)
- Depth: 4 feet (1.2 m)

SS Illecillewaet was a wooden-hulled stern wheeler that operated on the Arrow Lakes in British Columbia, Canada from 1892 to 1902. She was built as a replacement for SS Dispatch on the Columbia River and although she was not attractive, she served as a functional freight ship until she was converted into a barge and retired in 1902.

== Commission ==
Illecillewaet was commissioned soon after Captain James William Troup took over as general manager of the Columbia and Kootenay Steam Navigation Company (C&KSN) in 1892. She was built at the shipyard in Revelstoke, British Columbia to replace Dispatch, which had never been successful because her service was hindered during low water and when the water froze in winter. Illecillewaet was designed to "float on dew" with her shallow draft to enable operation during those times.

=== Design ===
Illecillewaet was not attractive, with a wooden hull similar that of a flat-bottomed barge and a blunt bow to break ice in the winter. However, she was useful as a freight carrier, especially during low water and when a small boat was preferable to a larger steamer with higher operating costs and a larger crew. She featured basic cedar cabins and was powered by two horizontal 8 feet (2.4 m) by 24 feet (7.3 m) 4.3 nominal horsepower engines manufactured at Albion Iron Works, Victoria, British Columbia.

== Service ==
Illecillewaet was launched on October 30, 1892. She transferred freight with Kootenai for growing railway construction and also serviced the north end of Upper Arrow Lake to Beaton, British Columbia, as well as the trail heads leading into the Trout Lake mining district in the southeast. In the late 1890s, she hauled rail and construction materials with SS Trail for the extension of the Columbia and Western Railway to the Boundary district. In 1897, Illecillewaet and SS Lytton provided a new barge service from Robson, British Columbia to West Robson to haul coal from the Crowsnest mines to Trail, British Columbia. In 1902, a bridge was built and Illecillewaet was converted into a barge for the Arrow Lakes. Her bow was reinforced to break ice.

=== Retirement ===
Later in 1902, Illecillewaet was retired and sold for CAD$500. She was dismantled and the cedar planking from her cabins were put into several nearby homes in Burton, British Columbia.
