= SS Trail =

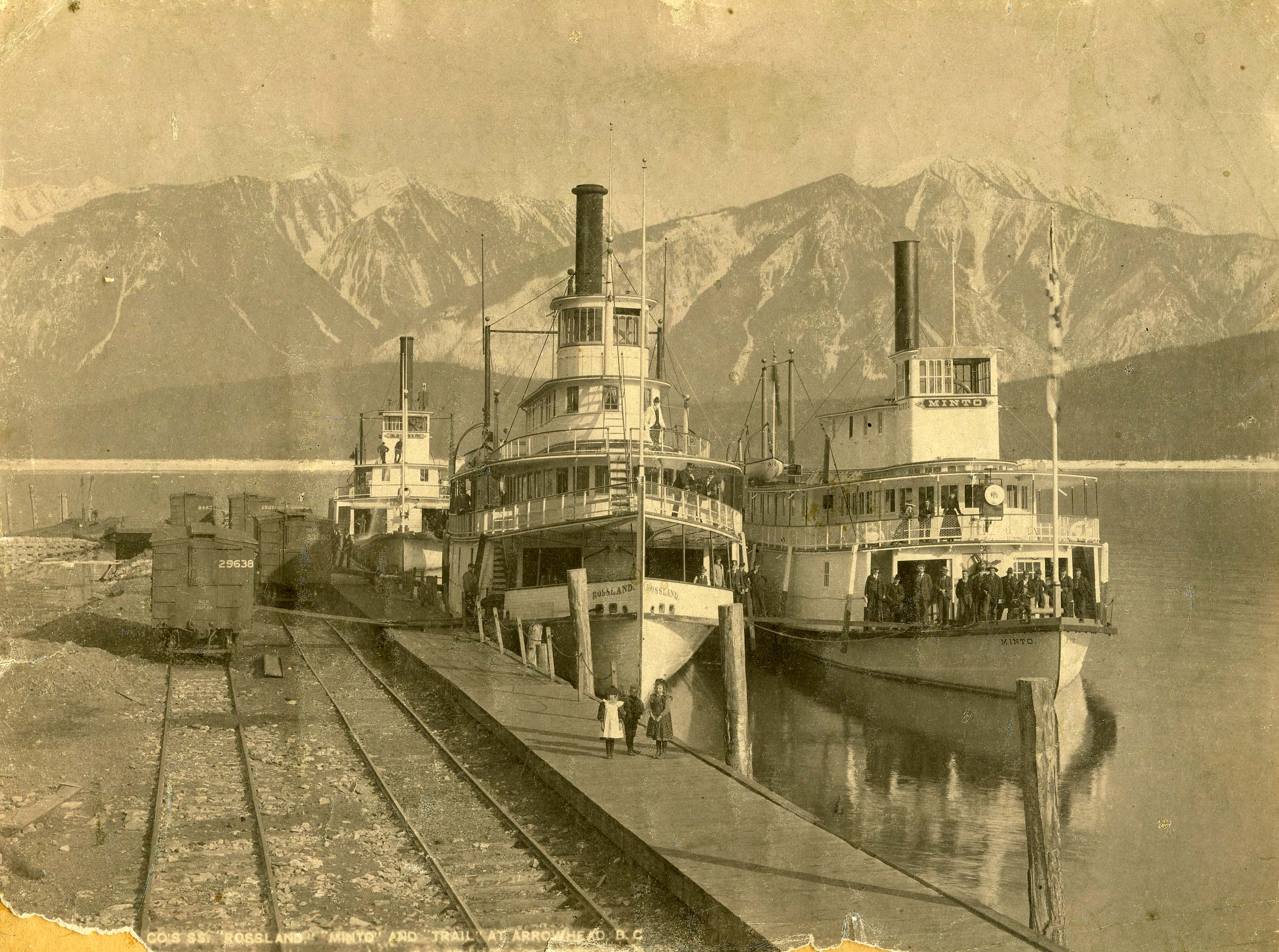
- Steamers Trail, Rossland and Minto at Arrowhead, British Columbia c.1900

History

Canada
- Name: Trail
- Owner: Canadian Pacific Railway, Columbia and Kootenay Steam Navigation Company
- Route: Columbia River
- Builder: J. McCain
- Launched: May 7, 1896
- Completed: 1896
- Maiden voyage: June 11, 1897
- In service: 1897–1900
- Out of service: 1900
- Fate: Burned

General characteristics
- Class & type: Sternwheeler
- Tonnage: 633 gross
- Length: 165 feet (50 m)
- Beam: 31 feet (9.4 m)
- Depth: 5 feet (1.5 m)

SS Trail was a sternwheeler used for freight on the Columbia River and Arrow Lakes in British Columbia, Canada. Built to replace SS Kootenai, Trail began service on June 11, 1896 and operated until 1900, when she burned down.

== Construction ==
By 1896, the earlier sternwheeler Kootenai had aged and was in need of a replacement. The new steamer was built at the shipyard in Nakusp, British Columbia by J. McCain and was named Trail. Her engines likely came from Kootenai, however her boiler was new, as the local newspaper, The Miner, reported on April 11 that SS Nakusp had brought a boiler for SS Trail from Arrowhead, British Columbia. Trail was launched on May 7, 1896, and began freight service on June 11. Trail was an important addition to the Columbia River fleet due to heavy traffic from mining and railway development. At 633 gross tons, she was the largest vessel in the fleet, alongside Nakusp. Trail was designed as a larger and improved version of Kootenai and although she was not a passenger ship, she was attractive to those who saw her at the docks.

== Service ==
Trail was used for freight service on the Columbia, which continued after Canadian Pacific Railway bought the Columbia and Kootenay Steam Navigation Company in 1897. Administrator and Captain James William Troup was soon taken by Trail's design and used it in 1898 as a basis for several future vessels on the Stikine River, including Hamlin, Schwatka, Duchesnay, and Constantine. After the launching of SS Minto in 1898, Trail and SS Illecillewaet were used to haul rail and construction materials for the extension of the Columbia and Western Railway to the Boundary region.

== Fate ==
While many Columbia River steamships of the time were dismantled or abandoned after retirement, Trail escaped such a fate by burning down at West Robson, British Columbia in June 1900. Only a charred hull, intact boiler, and still-standing funnel remained.
