= Robson/Raspberry =

Coordinates: 49.336°N 117.670°W

Robson/Raspberry is a designated place located north of Castlegar across the Columbia River combining two historical communities, Robson, formerly a steamboat landing and railway terminal, and Raspberry, formerly encompassing Sproat's Landing and later a Doukhobor colony. It has one school, Robson Community School.

== Demographics ==
- Population(2006): 464
- Population(2001): 502
- Total Dwellings: 207
- Area: 5.52 km^{2}
- Population Density: 84/km^{2}
