= Inonoaklin Valley =

Valley in British Columbia, Canada

- Location within British Columbia

Geography
- Location: West Kootenay, British Columbia, Canada
- Coordinates: 49°50′30″N 118°08′45″W
- River: Inonoaklin Creek
- Interactive map of Inonoaklin Valley

Inonoaklin Valley is a valley on the west side of Lower Arrow Lake that lies in the West Kootenay region of southeastern British Columbia.

== Name origin ==
Formerly known as Fire Valley, 1890 is the earliest newspaper reference. Although likely relating to a fire that consumed much of the valley prior to European presence, another theory claimed that red granite surrounding the valley prompted the name. In 1888, when John A Coryell headed west from the Cherry Creek area to survey a cattle trail connecting the Okanagan and Columbia River, forest fires in the area turned him back. In response to the negative connotations of wildfires, residents obtained the change to Inonoaklin Valley in 1926. Inonoaklin Creek, which formed the valley, is shown as Inonoaklin River on an 1871 map. A First Nations phrase, the meaning is unclear, but suggestions have been wandering, or winding waters.

An 1827 map shows a First Nations trail connecting to the Okanagan. In 1862, the government dispatched William George Cox to locate such a trail, but the dense forest and tangled undergrowth east of Cherry Creek proved too difficult. During 1864–1866, Charles Frederick Houghton was eventually successful. By this time, the Big Bend Gold Rush was drawing to a close, and interest in a trail waned. In 1889, Coryell had surveyed several routes, choosing Fire Valley eastward to the Killarney landing as preferable. In 1890, a 1.8-metre (6 ft) wide trail was slashed. At the eastern end in 1892, four bridges were built, and the trail widened to 2.4 metres (8 ft). In 1894, widening was to wagon road status, extending 11 kilometres (7 mi) up the valley. In 1897, near the Arrow Lake end, a branch was built across to Page's Landing, where a wharf was constructed, but later abandoned as Needles developed.

Prior to World War I, highway plans were promoted. Civilian immigrants, classified as enemy aliens, were interned at a camp at the top end of the valley from August 1915. Having limited equipment, the prisoners worked on building the highway. Despite labour disruptions, some progress was made prior to the camp's relocation to Edgewood in fall 1916. During the following years, locals slashed parts of the right-of-way. In 1922, Rawlings and La Brash were awarded the road contract, which was completed in July 1925. However, the August forest fire destroyed the wooden culverts and bridges, delaying the opening until September. During the 1930s, travel to Vernon took five hours on the rudimentary highway. Until the early 1950s, crossing the Monashee Mountains was restricted to summertime. In the early 1960s, the road was paved. When the reservoir for the Keenleyside Dam submerged the complementary lakeshore road in 1968, the highway/Edgewood road junction moved eastward. Travel time to Vernon is now less than two hours.

== Farming & orchards ==
In 1891, the first settlers were Richard R. Lowe, William Dure, John Bangs, John Glover, Alexander MacLean, and George W. Jordan, each securing Crown grants for their preemptions.

In 1901, the Edgewood Dairy Co. was established. Around 1910, realtors promoted the valley to buyers in England. Using pictures of Okanagan orchards, the publicity indicated that developed and bearing orchards occupied the land being sold. On arrival, the immigrants discovered their properties comprised a symbolic orchard and acres of uncleared forest. Most landowners persevered in establishing orchards. Logged trees were stacked by the creek, and dispatched downstream in the spring log drive for assembling into log rafts at the lake for towing by tug to sawmills.

By the mid-1920s, farms were mostly in the 160-to-640-acre (65 to 259 ha) range. Dairy farms in full production stretched from Edgewood for 16 kilometres (10 mi) up the valley. The orchards largely gone, agriculture and forestry industries have formed the economic base in recent decades.

== Community ==
Settlers disembarked from steamboats at Killarney landing. By fall 1894, 22 residents were establishing farms and orchards along the valley. That year, O.J. Vail was the inaugural postmaster. The post office closed in 1910.

As described in 1910, the valley was 19 kilometres (12 mi) long and 2 kilometres (1.5 mi) wide. The main settlement was 3 kilometres (2 mi) inland from a closer landing, which was 3 kilometres (2 mi) south of Needles by boat. Called the Old Fire Valley landing, the Canadian Pacific Railway had called this steamer stop Page's Landing. The earliest known reference to that name was in 1902. Formerly, the location was called McKallister's (or McAllister's) Landing, possibly the location of the original post office.

In 1909, George Heaton was the inaugural teacher. In 1918, a new schoolhouse was built. Ferret Road was the boundary line between the Fire Valley and Edgewood school districts. The 1946 implementation of the 1945 Cameron Report into BC school financing and administration created centralized larger districts. The establishment of School District 10 Arrow Lakes included the dissolving of such local school boards. As a consequence, the Valley school, captured all grades 6–7 in the general area, while the lower grades attended Edgewood, and the higher ones went to Needles. In 1949, The Valley school closed, and the other two schools expanded.

From the 1910s, residents in the lower valley functioned as part of the Edgewood community. In the mid-1910s, the telephone wires stretched up the valley to the main settlement, but did not extend farther northwestward until the 1960s. In 1952, the completion of the Whatshan Dam brought electricity to the valley.

== Accidents & tragedies ==
1915: An exploding box of dynamite killed a 16-year-old boy.

1951: A farmer died of accidental arsenic poisoning.

1955: A falling tree fatally crushed a logger's skull.

1968: A ski-doo accident fatally lacerated a logger's neck.

== See also ==
- "1897 Kootenay map". www.raremaps.com.
- "1899 Kootenay map". www.library.ubc.ca. p. 1.
- "1925 BC map". www.davidrumsey.com.
