= Fauquier, British Columbia =

Fauquier
- Community
- Etymology: Named for F.G. Fauquier
- Location in British Columbia
- Coordinates: 49°52′15″N 118°04′15″W
- Country: Canada
- Province: British Columbia
- Regional District: Central Kootenay
- Elevation: 480 m (1,570 ft)

Population (2016)
  - Total: 118
  - Density: 24.3/km^{2} (63/sq mi)
- Time zone: UTC-8 (Pacific Time Zone)
  - Summer (DST): UTC-7 (Pacific Time Zone)
- Postal code: V0G 1K0
- Area codes: 250, 778, 236, & 672

Fauquier (/foʊˈkɪər/) is an unincorporated place on the east shore of Lower Arrow Lake in the West Kootenay region of southeastern British Columbia. The eastern terminal for the Needles Ferry, the landing on Highway 6 is 57 kilometres (35 mi) south of Nakusp.

== Name origin ==
The community that arose in the 1910s was named for Frederick George Fauquier, who had served at times as a mining recorder, police officer, notary public, justice of the peace, government agent, stipendiary magistrate, and gold commissioner in the Kootenay region. Sentenced to two years for misappropriating public funds, he had settled at his ranch by 1905, which became known as Fauquier's Landing, or Fauquier.

== Former settlement ==
Fauquier developed one of the largest orchards on the lake, which led to the establishment of other orchards in the neighbourhood. The Canadian Pacific Railway steamers on the Arrowhead–Robson route served the landing. In the early 1930s, the post office and school served the 100 residents.

== New settlement ==
The original Fauquier townsite was submerged when the reservoir for the Keenleyside Dam flooded the area in 1968. The ferry terminals on both sides of the lake were rebuilt at the time. Relocated to higher ground, the settlement was initially called New Fauquier, but the New was soon dropped. The Tukaluk Campground accommodates visitors. The general store/gas bar/liquor outlet, and 9-hole Fauquier & District Golf Course, serve both visitors and residents.

== Climate ==
Fauquier has a humid continental climate.

Climate data for Fauquier, British Columbia
Month	Jan	Feb	Mar	Apr	May	Jun	Jul	Aug	Sep	Oct	Nov	Dec	Year
Record high °C (°F)	13.0 (55.4)	15.0 (59.0)	20.0 (68.0)	31.1 (88.0)	36.1 (97.0)	35.5 (95.9)	38.9 (102.0)	38.3 (100.9)	35.0 (95.0)	25.0 (77.0)	19.4 (66.9)	12.2 (54.0)	38.9 (102.0)
Mean daily maximum °C (°F)	0.6 (33.1)	2.7 (36.9)	8.0 (46.4)	13.9 (57.0)	18.8 (65.8)	22.5 (72.5)	26.1 (79.0)	25.6 (78.1)	19.4 (66.9)	11.4 (52.5)	4.7 (40.5)	0.5 (32.9)	12.9 (55.1)
Daily mean °C (°F)	−1.7 (28.9)	−0.6 (30.9)	3.4 (38.1)	7.8 (46.0)	12.2 (54.0)	15.8 (60.4)	18.7 (65.7)	18.2 (64.8)	13.1 (55.6)	7.2 (45.0)	2.0 (35.6)	−1.7 (28.9)	7.9 (46.2)
Mean daily minimum °C (°F)	−4.0 (24.8)	−3.8 (25.2)	−1.3 (29.7)	1.7 (35.1)	5.5 (41.9)	9.1 (48.4)	11.2 (52.2)	10.7 (51.3)	6.8 (44.2)	2.9 (37.2)	−0.6 (30.9)	−3.8 (25.2)	2.9 (37.2)
Record low °C (°F)	−31.7 (−25.1)	−27.8 (−18.0)	−21.1 (−6.0)	−11.1 (12.0)	−4.4 (24.1)	−1.1 (30.0)	1.7 (35.1)	0.6 (33.1)	−6.7 (19.9)	−12.5 (9.5)	−20.0 (−4.0)	−29.4 (−20.9)	−31.7 (−25.1)
Average precipitation mm (inches)	73.8 (2.91)	44.3 (1.74)	56.9 (2.24)	61.6 (2.43)	76.1 (3.00)	90.1 (3.55)	66.6 (2.62)	47.4 (1.87)	56.3 (2.22)	63.8 (2.51)	81.1 (3.19)	73.4 (2.89)	791.4 (31.17)
Average rainfall mm (inches)	24.9 (0.98)	24.7 (0.97)	48.5 (1.91)	61.3 (2.41)	76.1 (3.00)	90.1 (3.55)	66.6 (2.62)	47.4 (1.87)	56.3 (2.22)	63.5 (2.50)	61.7 (2.43)	26.2 (1.03)	647.3 (25.49)
Average snowfall cm (inches)	48.9 (19.3)	19.6 (7.7)	8.4 (3.3)	0.3 (0.1)	0.0 (0.0)	0.0 (0.0)	0.0 (0.0)	0.0 (0.0)	0.0 (0.0)	0.4 (0.2)	19.4 (7.6)	47.2 (18.6)	144.2 (56.8)
Average precipitation days (≥ 0.2 mm)	16.5	12.8	15.0	14.7	15.8	16.4	11.2	10.4	10.5	15.1	18.5	16.3	173.2
Average rainy days (≥ 0.2 mm)	7.7	7.8	13.5	14.7	15.8	16.4	11.2	10.4	10.5	15.0	15.0	6.7	144.7
Average snowy days (≥ 0.2 cm)	10.8	6.3	2.7	0.38	0.0	0.0	0.0	0.0	0.0	0.31	4.9	11.3	36.69
Source: 1981-2010 Environment Canada

== See also ==
- Fauquier County, Virginia, a county in Virginia, United States of America.
