= Needles Ferry =

Cable ferry in British Columbia, Canada

Coordinates: 49°52′22″N 118°05′23″W

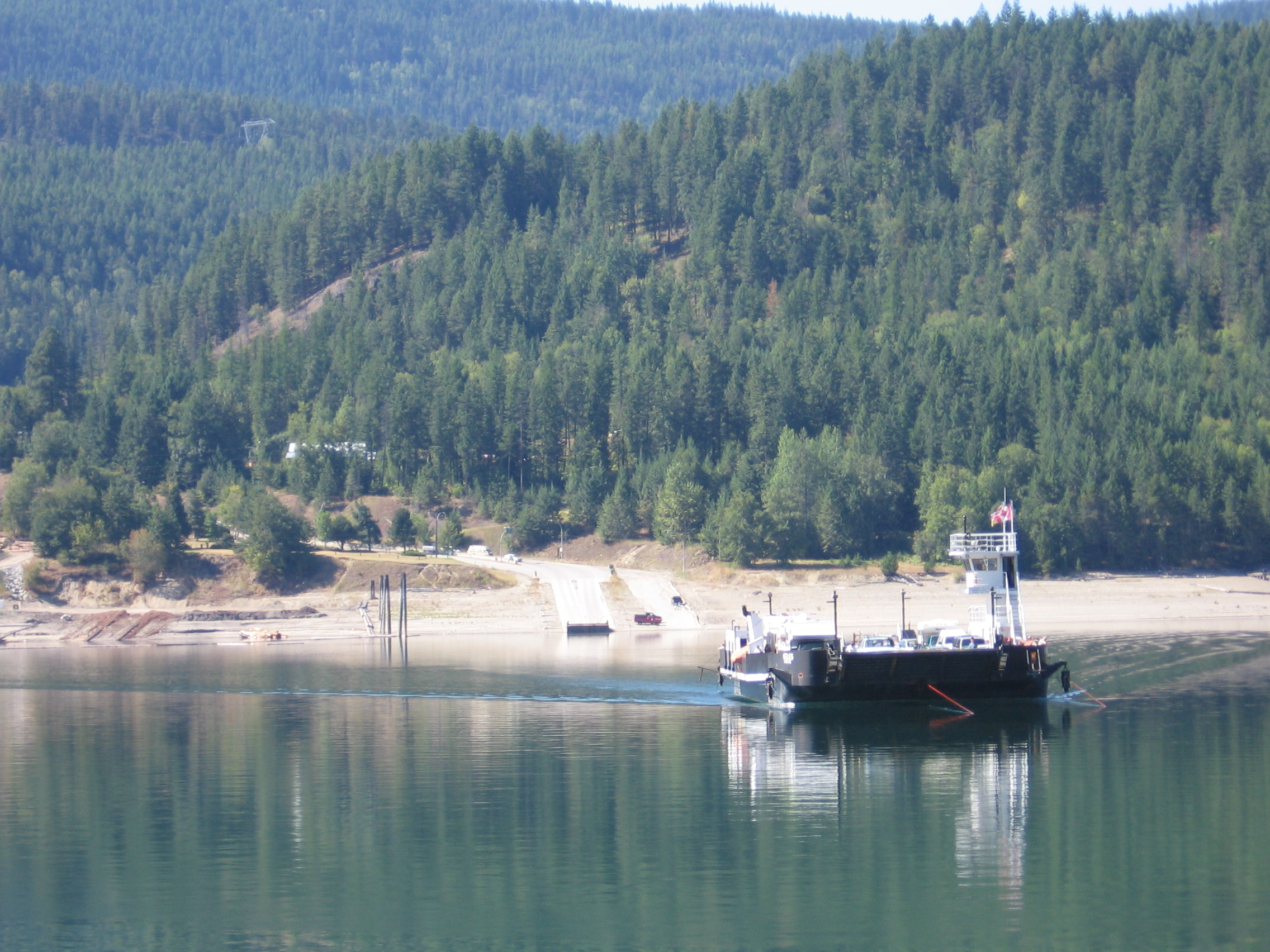
- Needles Ferry
- Locale: Needles−Fauquier
- Waterway: Lower Arrow Lake
- Transit type: Passenger and vehicle ferry
- Carries: Highway 6
- Owner: BC Ministry of Transportation and Infrastructure
- Operator: WaterBridge Ferries Inc.
- System length: 0.9 km (0.6 mi)
- No. of lines: 1
- No. of vessels: 1
- No. of terminals: 2
- Website: www2.gov.bc.ca/gov/content/transportation/passenger-travel/water-travel/inland-ferries/needles-cable-ferry

Location in British Columbia

The Needles Ferry is a cable ferry across Lower Arrow Lake in the West Kootenay region of southeastern British Columbia. Linking Needles and Fauquier, the ferry, part of BC Highway 6, is by road about 135 kilometres (84 mi) southeast of Vernon and 57 kilometres (35 mi) southwest of Nakusp.

== Timeline ==
1913: Farmers built the first vehicle ferry using Ford Model T parts. Apart from a reference to a rudimentary raft in 1922, no evidence exists of a service most years.
1924: Government ferry launched, which comprised a log raft pushed by a launch. This free service, had a one-car capacity.
1928: Larger boat introduced.
1931: Wooden hulled cable ferry installed, having three-car capacity. Crossings were hourly.
1941: Upgraded to eight-car capacity.
1952: Upgraded to 16-car capacity.
1955: Service increased from 12 to 24 hours per day.
1967: Replacement bridge confirmed, but never eventuated.
1968: Both terminals rebuilt on submerging by the reservoir for the Keenleyside Dam.
1969: Diesel-powered Needles with 28-car capacity introduced.
1990: Needles relocated to Upper Arrow Lake Ferry route. Replaced by a 40-vehicle, 150-passenger cable ferry. At 1,500 metres (5,000 ft) was longest haul cable in North America.
2002: Service reduced to 17 hours per day.
2004: Western Pacific Marine became the service contractor.
c.2013: WaterBridge Ferries became the service provider.
2019: Ferry crew observed a submerged pickup truck just off the Needles ferry landing.

== Patronage ==
Prior to 1960

Patronage (1924–1947)^{a} (Double these numbers for single trips)
Type	Year	Page	Round Trips	Motor Vehicles	Horse- drawn rigs	Passengers	Freight (tons)	Livestock	Total Vehicles
Power boat	1924–25	Q38	1,008	256	30	2,186	682	36	286
Power boat	1925–26	Q38	1,852	2,557	56	4,037	42	100	2,613
Power boat	1926–27	P46	2,264	1,604	44	6,004	46	96	1,648
Power boat	1927–28	U52	7,138	1,530	40	5,162	39	41	1,570
Power boat	1928–29	S61	2,155	2,442	38	5,972	89	86	2,480
Power boat	1929–30	T74	2,155	2,366	79	5,899	68	87	2,445
Power cable	1930–31	G50	4,102	4,790	231	11,354	340	172	5,021
Power cable	1931–32	M40	4,117	5,244	385	11,836	582	159	5,629
Power cable	1932–33	Q36	4,049	4,438	369	13,203	503	135	4,807
Power cable	1933–34	O32	4,675	4,740	510	14,827	784	259	5,250
Power cable	1934–35	T37	5,427	6,181	700	18,449	719	605	6,881
Power cable	1935–36	I44	5,637	6,882	661	18,834	820	239	7,543
Power cable	1936–37	X52	5,992	7,733	825	19,804	998	355	8,558
Power cable	1937–38	X55	6,823	9,046	911	22,305	1,292	228	9,957
Power cable	1938–39	Z56	6,580	9,188	758	20,605	1,830	262	9,946
Power cable	1939–40	P56	7,220	9,346	541	21,324	1,938	310	9,887
Power cable	1940–41	O47	7,109	10,237	359	18,403	1,181	360	10,596
Power cable	1941–42	T52	6,628	10,894	229	20,010	2,116	590	11,123
Power cable	1942–43	O52	5,764	8,318	316	14,367	3,525	441	8,634
Power cable	1943–44	Q52	4,984	7,359	225	12,679	1,730	426	7,584
Power cable	1944–45	O51	4,985	7,284	74	14,699	1,814	217	7,358
Power cable	1945–46	Q58	5,426	8,620	264	14,037	1,707	330	8,884
Power cable	1946–47	P47	7,262	11,971	88	27,079	7,416	345	12,059

^a . Extracted from the respective Ministry of Public Works annual reports.

Patronage (1947–1960)^{b} (Double these numbers for single trips)
Type	Year	Page	Round Trips	Passenger Autos	Passengers (Drivers excluded)	Trucks	Trailers & Semis	Buses	Motor- cycles	Horse- drawn rigs	Freight (tons)	Livestock	Misc. Veh.	Total Vehicles
Power cable	1947–48	N56	7,435	6,759	30,300	4,466	1,426	1,625	20	146	2,750	163		14,442
Power cable	1948–49	O60	9,953	10,558	49,803	6,427	394	1,787	29	164	6,361	170		19,359
Power cable	1949–50	Q74	12,928	15,311	60,151	9,970	433	1,737	19	71	6,798	140		27,541
Power cable	1950–51	N77	14,437	16,854	60,045	11,635	208	1,450	18	74	6,179	174		30,239
Power cable	1951–52	P83	12,868	12,758	52,322	10,200	372	1,535	10	45	4,614	99		24,920
Power cable	1952–53	O85	12,738	13,662	50,004	9,071	852	2,067	30	63	5,317	136		25,745
Power cable	1953–54	M93	16,009	19,216	60,776	11,911	544	1,997	63	18	4,560	84		33,749
Power cable	1954–55	K95	15,506	17,828	55,003	11,733	558	2,035	26	25	4,891	110		32,205
Power cable	1955–56	N88	14,601	16,783	48,373	10,947	379	1,661	11	26		67	4	29,811
Power cable	1956–57	J100	15,326	18,103	52,668	13,254	601	919	4	31		60		32,912
Power cable	1957–58	G53	15,428	20,400	56,907	13,420	528	720	10	12		71	6	35,096
Power cable	1958–59	G36	14,226	18,863	53,049	10,515	515	870	12			104		30,775
Power cable	1959–60	F41	15,226	20,939	53,077	11,450	561	718	10	8		82		33,686

^b . Extracted from the respective Ministry of Public Works or Ministry of Highways annual reports.

== Operation ==
The ferry operates under private contract with the British Columbia Ministry of Transportation and is free of tolls, as are all inland ferries in British Columbia.

Departures are every thirty minutes, from the first at 5 am until the last at 10 pm, with a crossing time of about five minutes. The ferry has capacity for 40 vehicles and 135 passengers.

== See also ==
- Steamboats of the Arrow Lakes
- List of Inland Ferries in British Columbia
