= St. Leon, British Columbia =

St. Leon
- Location of St. Leon in British Columbia
- Coordinates: 50°25′59″N 117°53′04″W
- Country: Canada
- Province: British Columbia

St. Leon, formerly known as Leon and also known as St. Leon Hot Springs because of an active mineral spring located nearby, is an unincorporated settlement and former hot springs resort and steamboat landing on the east side of Upper Arrow Lake in the Kootenay Country of British Columbia, Canada, located at the mouth of St. Leon Creek, between Nakusp (S) and Halcyon Hot Springs (N) (another spa/resort). The name of nearby Mount St. Leon is derived from that of the springs and settlement.

== Name origin ==
According to one entry in the British Columbia Geographical Names Information System, the name is thought to have been conferred by an early hunter and trapper in the area, who had relatives in "St. Pol de Leon" (actually Saint-Pol-de-Léon), Finistère, France, but another account says it was named for one of the many places named St. Leon in Quebec which also had a mineral spring.

== History ==
The springs were first discovered and land in the area claimed by Michael M. Grady of Revelstoke in 1894 who built a small hotel, then rebuilt it in 1901 and again in 1906 (Grady Lake and Mount Grady in the same area are named for M.M. Grady). The resort was popular throughout the Kootenays and thrived from being a port-of-call on the Arrow Lakes steamboat route, which connected with railway lines at Castlegar and Revelstoke.

Due to the economic downturn in the first year of World War I, Grady closed the hotel and disconnected its supply of hot water from the springs. Citizens of Revelstoke appealed to him to create a townsite out of his original alienation of 320 acres (1.3 km^{2}) so they could build campsites and cottages for their own private use, which he did in 1918, with 10 cottages being erected soon after.

The settlement was inundated, and its name rescinded, following the raising of the level of the Arrow Lakes by the Keenlyside Dam at Castlegar.

== See also ==
- List of ghost towns in British Columbia
