= Marion (sternwheeler) =

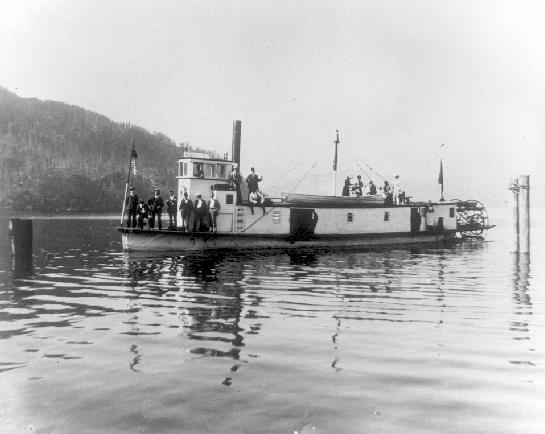
- Marion somewhere in interior British Columbia, ca 1890s

History

Canada
- Name: Marion
- Owner: Frank P. Armstrong
- Port of registry: Canada
- Route: Inland British Columbia on Columbia River, later Arrow Lakes and Kootenay Lake
- Builder: Alexander Watson
- Launched: 1888 at Golden, BC
- In service: 1888
- Out of service: 1901
- Identification: CAN #94801
- Fate: Sank January 1901 at Kaslo, BC

General characteristics
- Type: Inland passenger/freighter
- Tonnage: 15 gross tons; 9.3 registered tons
- Length: 61 ft (19 m)
- Beam: 10.3 ft (3.1 m)
- Depth: 3.6 ft (1 m) depth of hold
- Installed power: twin steam engines, horizontally mounted, 2.1 nominal horsepower, manufactured by Polson Iron Works
- Propulsion: sternwheel

Marion was a small sternwheel steamboat that operated in several waterways in inland British Columbia from 1888 to 1901.

== Design and construction ==
Marion was built at Golden, BC in 1888 for Frank P. Armstrong by Alexander Watson, a shipbuilder from Victoria, BC. Marion's engines were manufactured by Polson Iron Works of Toronto. Marion had a deckhouse and a wheelhouse but no passenger cabin. Passengers simply perched wherever they could on the boat deck.

== Operations in Columbia Valley ==
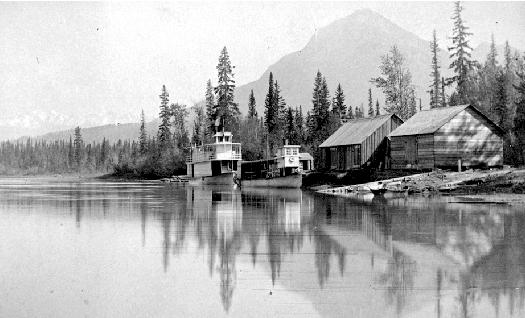
Marion (smaller vessel nearest to dock) and Duchess at the north end of Columbia Lake ca 1890

Capt. Armstrong operated Marion on the uppermost reach of the Columbia River, which ran from Golden, BC south down the Columbia Valley to the headwaters of the river at Columbia Lake. Small sternwheelers like Marion played an important role in development by allowing miners, loggers and entrepreneurs to penetrate the region. They also established the economic viability of steamboat operations in eastern British Columbia, which led to the placement of larger steamers on the routes that the small boats had pioneered.

== Transfer to Arrow Lakes ==
In 1889, Armstrong had Marion shipped by rail on two flat cars to Revelstoke, British Columbia, an important junction where the transcontinental line of the Canadian Pacific Railway made one of its two crossings of the Columbia River. From Revelstoke, a steamboat could navigate south down the Columbia River to the Arrow Lakes and on the lakes proceed far to the south, near the international border, where spectacular mining discoveries were being made in the late 1880s. Near the southern end of the lakes was a little settlement called Sproat's Landing. Armstrong put Marion on the Revelstoke-Sproat's Landing route, running in opposition to the catamaran steamer Despatch, the only other steam vessel then in operation on the Arrow Lakes.

In 1890, Armstrong sold Marion to Capt. Robert Sanderson, who worked the vessel on various routes out of Arrowhead, BC. (Other sources state it was Sanderson who purchased Marion in 1889 and had her shipped to Revelstoke.) Marion was used as a low-water vessel. This was important because at that time the Upper and Lower Arrow Lakes were separated by a shallow stretch of water known as the "narrows". During certain times of the year such as the later summer, water levels were low in the narrows and also on the Columbia River. Vessels with a shallow draft such as Marion could continue to use the water routes when vessels requiring deeper water to float in were forced to curtail operations.

== Transfer to Kootenay Lake ==
In 1897, the Kootenay and Arrowhead Railway, a subsidiary of the CPR announced plans to build a rail line along the course of the Lardeau River from Kootenay Lake to Upper Arrow Lake. The Great Northern Railway also began surveying the same route, with a view towards constructing a completing line on the opposite of the river.

In 1897 Marion was shipped to Kootenay Lake. Once on Kootenay Lake Marion was operated on the Duncan River which flows into Kootenay Lake from the north. Marion also provided service to Kootenay Flats at the southern end of Kootenay Lake.

== Sinking ==
In January 1901 Marion sank in a gale while moored at Kaslo, BC. In 1907 Captain Sanderson broke up the vessel and used her machinery to bore wood pipes at a mill in St. Leon, BC.
