= Raspberry, British Columbia =

Coordinates: 49.3355°N 117.6573°W

Raspberry is an unincorporated community in the West Kootenay region of southeastern British Columbia. On the northeast side of the Columbia River adjacent to the mouth of Norns (formerly Pass) Creek, the residential area is part of Greater Castlegar.

== Sproat's Landing ==
In 1888, Thomas Alexander Sproat preempted 320 acres, which straddled the creek mouth. Sproat's Landing was a key stopping point for sternwheelers soon passing regularly to northern points. The sheltered pond area provided a natural crossroads for the northwestward Columbia River, northward Pass Creek track, and northeastward Kootenay River. The original townsite is today's Castlegar sewage lagoons, and the landing was immediately south. Within a year, a ferry operated to the future Castlegar townsite.

Thomas appears to have acted as a front for his younger brother Gilbert Malcolm Sproat, and Arthur S. Farwell, both barred from real estate speculation as prominent public servants. At that time, Gilbert created a government funded trail up the Kootenay Valley. Meanwhile, the settlement spread up onto the downstream bench, where a saloon and Kootenay House Hotel were erected. Rails for the construction of the Columbia and Kootenay Railway (C&K) were delivered to the landing. A sawmill at the creek mouth cut ties and timber for the railway. Another general store, restaurant, drugstore, blacksmith and sheet-metal shop opened. For a year, the new station was the western terminus, until the C&K connected the benches on either side of the creek with a trestle. Bypassing the landing, the line advanced westward in 1891 to what would become Robson.

When Thomas secured his property as a Crown Grant in 1892, he sold it to Farwell's syndicate, who laid out the new town of Columbia, west of the creek. Over the next couple of years, the businesses and residents of Sproat's Landing steadily relocated to Robson. The 1894 flood washed away the final remnants on the low-lying land east of the creek, but a new railway spur connecting to steamboats at the landing provided the 1895–1897 revival. In 1902, the opening of the Canadian Pacific Railway (CP) swing-bridge over the Columbia obliterated any evidence of the landing.

In 1910 the Edgewood Lumber Company relocated its sawmill from Upper Arrow Lake to the old landing area, which became known as Mill Pond. By 1928, the mill supported an expanding community of family cottages and bunkhouses. Extensive damage from the 1948 flood shuttered the venture. Purchased by the Canadian Celanese Corporation, the 1952–1961 operations were on a smaller scale. A 1963 fire consumed all of Mill Pond.

The southern section of Raspberry contains the sewage lagoons and the Waldie Island Trail. Opened in 1996, the trail meanders through the hawthorn, wild rose, willows and dogwoods. Along the route, interpretive plaques provide a history of the area.

== Commune ==
In 1929, nearby Doukhobor communes bought, cleared, and established a commercial orchard on the northern part. The Ootischenia workshops manufactured the wooden irrigation pipes, which drew water from the creek. In 1932, a brick village was built for permanent residents to tend the orchard. The name came from a nearby raspberry plantation within the acreage. Originally called Malinovoye (Малиновое, raspberry in Russian), the name evolved into the English word. Although distinct places, the school at Brilliant, built in 1934, was called Raspberry school.

== Subdivision ==
Following a declining population for two decades, the government acquired and subdivided the land, first offering lots to existing residents. Raspberry is one of the few places in which the traditional Doukhobor communal houses (with later modifications) remain standing. Until the early 1990s, one was Raspberry Lodge, a long-term care facility. Since the dividing line between Raspberry and Robson to the west is debatable, Robson-Raspberry is the unofficial amalgamation for census and improvement district purposes.
