= Marcus, Washington =

Marcus
- Town
- Marcus, Washington
- Location of Marcus, Washington
- Coordinates: 48°39′51″N 118°03′36″W
- Country: United States
- State: Washington
- County: Stevens

Government
  - Type: Mayor–council
  - Mayor: Christopher Fox

Area
  - Total: 0.22 sq mi (0.57 km^{2})
  - Land: 0.22 sq mi (0.57 km^{2})
  - Water: 0 sq mi (0.00 km^{2})
- Elevation: 1,401 ft (427 m)

Population (2020)
  - Total: 216
  - Density: 980/sq mi (380/km^{2})
- Time zone: UTC-8 (Pacific (PST))
  - Summer (DST): UTC-7 (PDT)
- ZIP code: 99151
- Area code: 509
- FIPS code: 53-43395
- GNIS feature ID: 2412955
- Website: Town of Marcus

Marcus is a town in Stevens County, Washington, United States. The population was 216 at the 2020 census.

== History ==
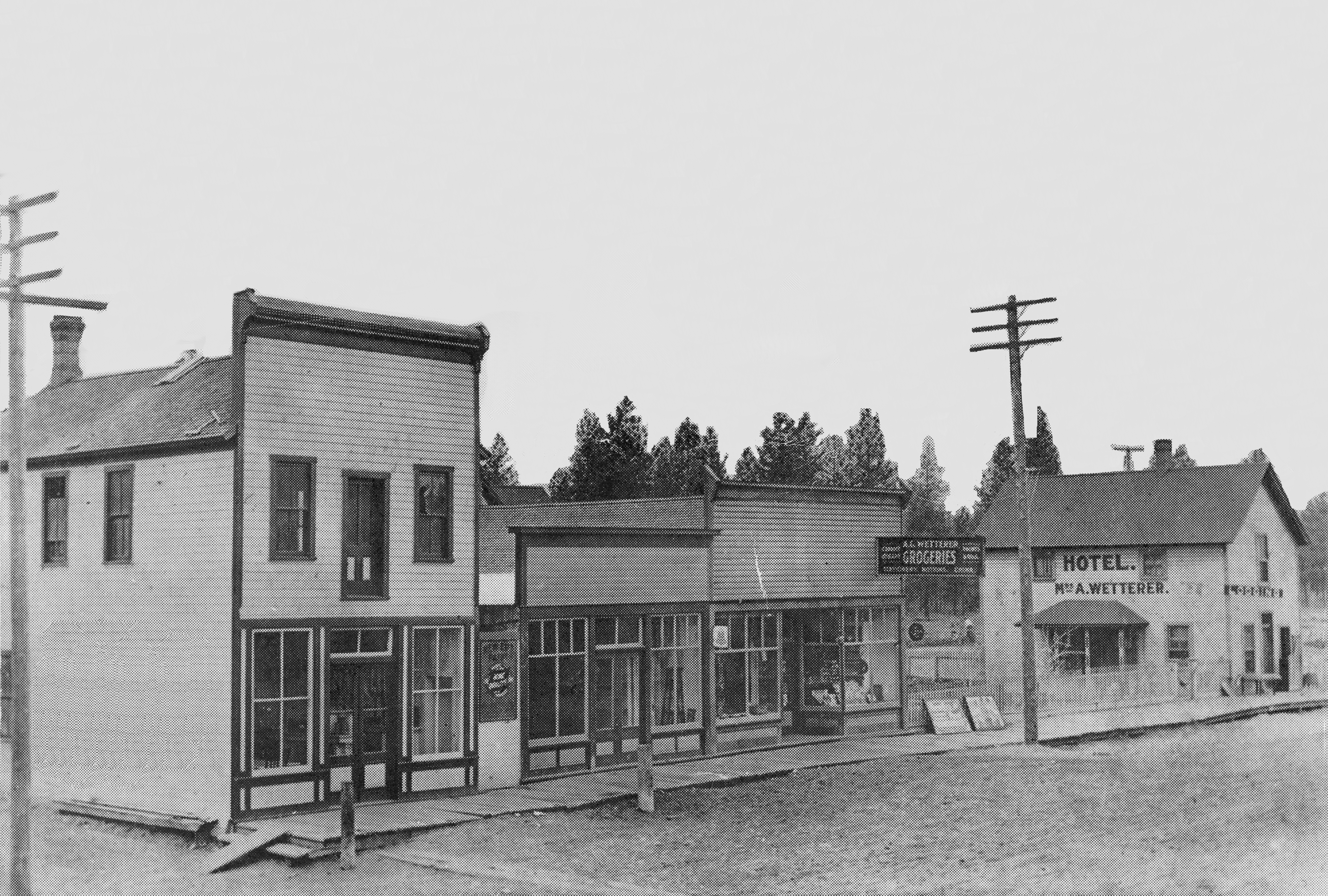
Marcus, circa 1900

Marcus was named for Marcus Oppenheimer who settled in the area in 1863.

Marcus was a supply and transportation base for northward-bound travellers during the Big Bend Gold Rush of the 1860s in the Colony of British Columbia due to its location just above Kettle Falls, a wall to river navigation. In 1865 the steamboat Forty-Nine was built at Marcus to attempt the run to the goldrush boomtown of La Porte at the foot of the infamous Dalles des Morts or "Death Rapids", which were located in the immediate vicinity of the rush and were the upper barrier to river navigation. Regular service from Marcus to La Porte did not begin until 1866 due to difficult winter conditions at the Narrows of the Arrow Lakes on the first attempt in 1865.

Marcus was officially incorporated on October 18, 1910. The original townsite was submerged beneath the waters of Franklin D. Roosevelt Lake when Grand Coulee Dam was built.

== Geography ==
According to the United States Census Bureau, the town has a total area of 0.23 square miles (0.60 km^{2}), all of it land.

=== Climate ===
This climatic region is typified by large seasonal temperature differences, with warm to hot (and often humid) summers and cold (sometimes severely cold) winters. According to the Köppen Climate Classification system, Marcus has a humid continental climate, abbreviated "Dfb" on climate maps.

== Demographics ==
Historical population
| Census | Pop. | Note | %± |
|---|---|---|---|
| 1890 | 311 | | — |
| 1910 | 481 | | — |
| 1920 | 551 | | 14.6% |
| 1930 | 583 | | 5.8% |
| 1940 | 393 | | −32.6% |
| 1950 | 149 | | −62.1% |
| 1960 | 126 | | −15.4% |
| 1970 | 142 | | 12.7% |
| 1980 | 174 | | 22.5% |
| 1990 | 135 | | −22.4% |
| 2000 | 117 | | −13.3% |
| 2010 | 183 | | 56.4% |
| 2020 | 216 | | 18.0% |
U.S. Decennial Census; 2015 Estimate

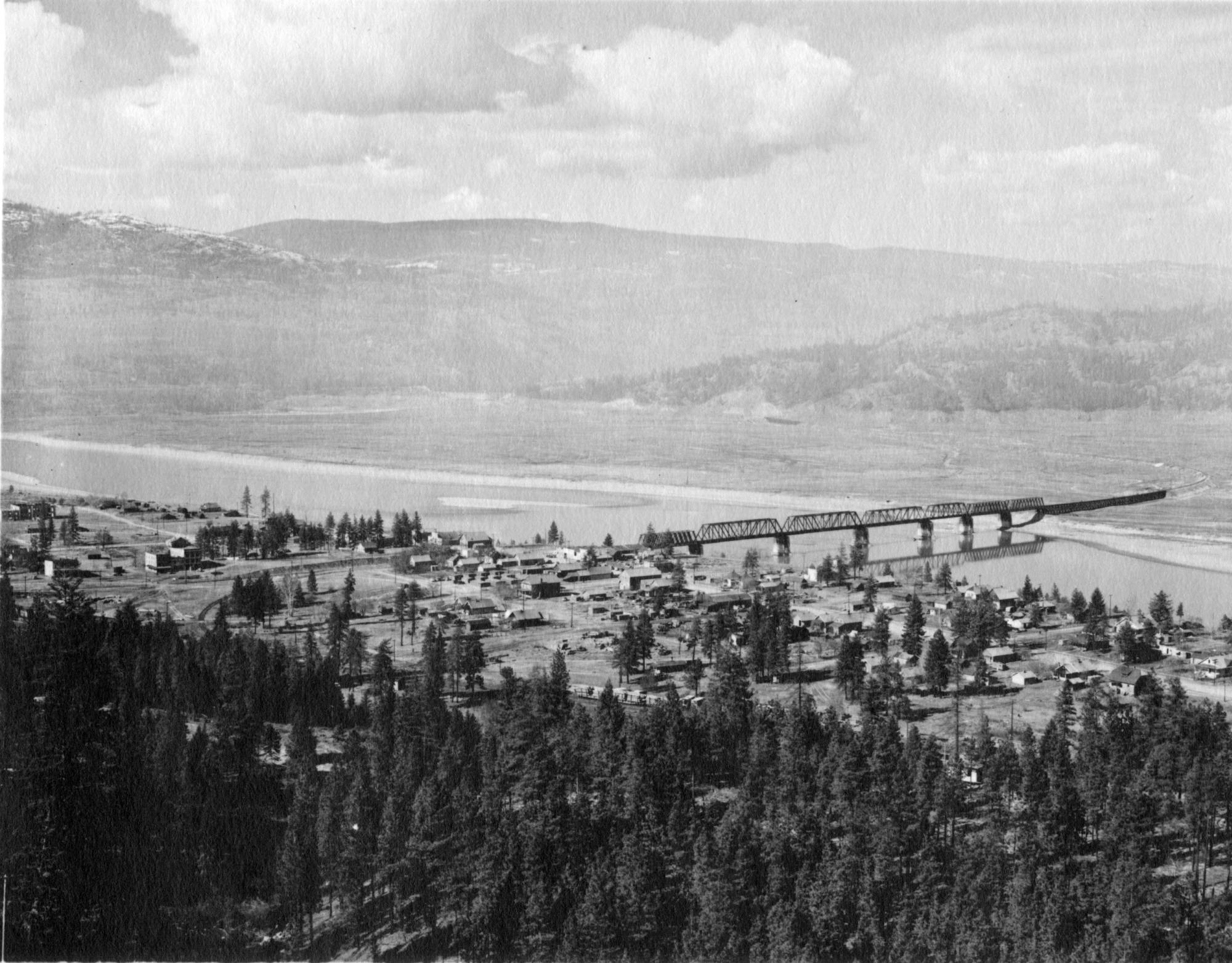
Marcus, 1941

=== 2010 census ===
As of the 2010 census, there were 183 people, 76 households, and 49 families residing in the town. The population density was 795.7 inhabitants per square mile (307.2/km^{2}). There were 82 housing units at an average density of 356.5 units per square mile (137.6 units/km^{2}). The racial makeup of the town was 94.0% White, 0.5% African American, 2.7% Native American, 0.5% Asian, and 2.2% from two or more races. Hispanic or Latino of any race were 0.5% of the population.

There were 76 households, of which 23.7% had children under the age of 18 living with them, 52.6% were married couples living together, 7.9% had a female householder with no husband present, 3.9% had a male householder with no wife present, and 35.5% were non-families. 30.3% of all households were made up of individuals, and 7.9% had someone living alone who was 65 years of age or older. The average household size was 2.41 and the average family size was 2.80.

The median age in the town was 48.8 years. 18% of residents were under the age of 18; 8.8% were between the ages of 18 and 24; 18.1% were from 25 to 44; 33.9% were from 45 to 64; and 21.3% were 65 years of age or older. The gender makeup of the town was 50.8% male and 49.2% female.

=== 2000 census ===
As of the 2000 census, there were 117 people, 48 households, and 33 families residing in the town. The population density was 495.3 people per square mile (191.2 people/km^{2}). There were 52 housing units at an average density of 220.1 units per square mile (85.0 units/km^{2}). The racial makeup of the town was 95.73% White, 0.85% Native American, 0.85% Asian, 0.85% from other races, and 1.71% from two or more races. Hispanic or Latino of any race were 2.56% of the population.

There were 48 households, out of which 29.2% had children under the age of 18 living with them, 56.3% were married couples living together, 6.3% had a female householder with no husband present, and 29.2% were non-families. 20.8% of all households were made up of individuals, and 8.3% had someone living alone who was 65 years of age or older. The average household size was 2.44 and the average family size was 2.76.

In the town, the age distribution of the population shows 26.5% under the age of 18, 9.4% from 18 to 24, 17.1% from 25 to 44, 32.5% from 45 to 64, and 14.5% who were 65 years of age or older. The median age was 44 years. For every 100 females, there were 88.7 males. For every 100 females age 18 and over, there were 95.5 males.

The median income for a household in the town was $27,500, and the median income for a family was $31,250. Males had a median income of $30,417 versus $22,500 for females. The per capita income for the town was $10,798. There were 25.0% of families and 28.4% of the population living below the poverty line, including 41.2% of under eighteens and 5.3% of those over 64.
