= Lytton (sternwheeler) =

Canadian sternwheel steamboat

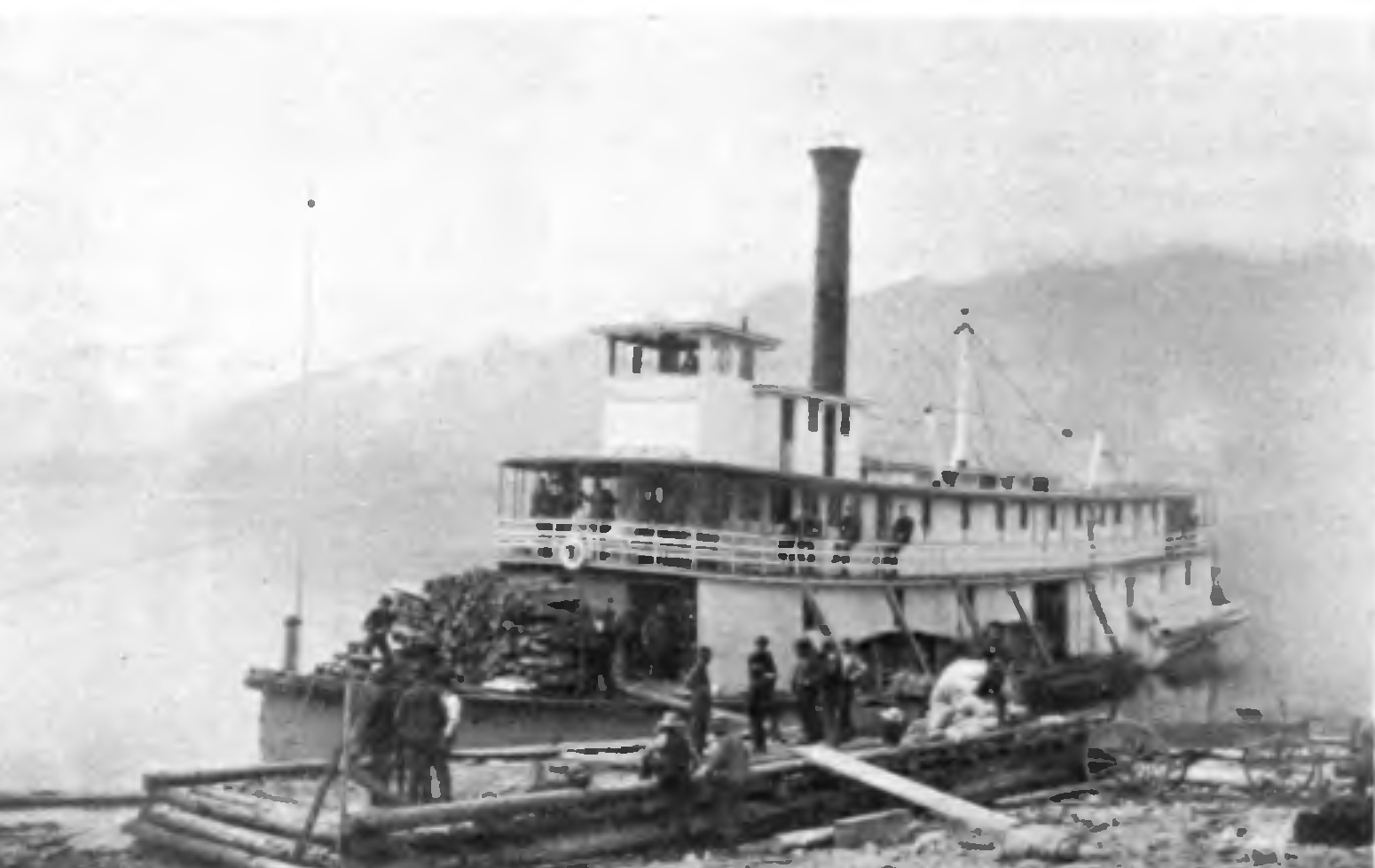
- Lytton

History

Canada
- Name: Lytton
- Owner: Columbia & Kootenay Steam Navigation Co.; Canadian Pacific Railway
- Route: Arrow Lakes
- Builder: Alexander Watson
- Cost: $38,000
- Laid down: December, 1889 at Revelstoke, BC
- Maiden voyage: July 2, 1890
- In service: 1890
- Out of service: 1904
- Identification: CAN 94905
- Fate: Scrapped

General characteristics
- Type: inland shallow-draft boat passenger/freighter
- Tonnage: 452 gross; 285 net
- Length: 131 ft (40 m)
- Beam: 25.5 ft (8 m)
- Depth: 4.8 ft (1 m) depth of hold
- Installed power: twin steam engines manufactured by Albion Iron Works of Victoria, British Columbia, twin single-cylinder, horizontally mounted, 16" bore by 54" stroke, 16 hp (12 kW) nominal
- Propulsion: sternwheel
- Speed: 12.3 miles per hour average (varied greatly depending on river currents)

Lytton was a sternwheel steamboat that ran on the Arrow Lakes and the Columbia River in southeastern British Columbia and northeastern Washington from 1890 to 1904.

== Design and construction ==
Lytton was built at Revelstoke, British Columbia. She was the first vessel constructed for the newly formed Columbia and Kootenay Steam Navigation Company. Construction began in December 1889, but winter ice conditions forced a suspension of work until April 1890. Alexander Watson, a veteran shipbuilder, supervised the construction, for which he had recruited a crew of carpenters from Victoria, British Columbia. The engines for Lytton were second-hand, coming from the steamer Gertrude which ran on the Stikine and lower Fraser rivers from 1875 to 1887.

Lytton was a typical Columbia River steamer. She had three decks, the first one being reserved for freight, machinery and crew quarters, the second for passengers, including cabins and an observation saloon. Down the center of the passenger deck was a dining room with raised clerestory windows At the front of the top deck was placed the pilot house. Just behind the pilot house was a small structure called the "texas", which contained cabins for the officers. Behind the texas was the vessel's single funnel, and on the front of the funnel was the steamer's whistle. In the case of Lytton, the funnel flared out in cone near the top, and may have been fitted with a spark arrestor. This detail was somewhat unusual and allows Lytton to be more readily identified in photographs of the period. The foredeck was open, and was often heavily loaded with cordwood fuel or cargo.

Lytton was designed to be a shallow draft vessel to allow her to negotiate rapids and other areas of low water. With no cargo on board, Lytton drew only 19 inches (480 mm) of water. When fully loaded with approximately 60 tons of cargo, the draft increased to 2 feet 6 inches (0.76 m) The flat shallow draft hull was kept in shape by "hog chains" carried on large posts which, tuned by turnbuckles, supported the hull much like a bridge truss.

== Operations ==
=== First voyage down the river and the lakes ===
Capt. Frank Odlin took Lytton out of Revelstoke for her first commercial trip in early July 1890. Lytton was not a large or luxurious vessel even compared to other steamboats of the time. However, for Revelstoke, Lytton, the first significant steam vessel built in the town, was big news. Historian Downs, relying on accounts of the day described Lytton's departure on her first voyage, leaving Revelstoke:

with 'hearty good wishes and ... waving of handkerchiefs.' At midnight ' a grand display of thunder and lightning ... greeted the steamboat, whose well-tinned and painted decks shed the water like a canvasback.

The downriver voyage began on July 2, 1890, at the dock near where the new large bridge of the Canadian Pacific Railway crossed the Columbia River. Lytton then steamed over to the Revelstoke smelter dock, where 65 tons of steel rails, fishplates and other track building supplies were loaded on board.

The destination for these rail supplies was far down the lakes at Sproats Landing, BC or modern day Castlegar, where the Kootenay River joins the Columbia. The CPR was building a portage railway from Nelson to Trail to allow it to access the mines in those towns and trans-ship ore and supplies from that train to the lake steamers enabling the freight to be moved one hundred miles north over the lake to the CPR port and dock at Arrowhead where a branch line stopped. The Kootenay River connected to the Nelson Arm of Kootenay Lake. The Kootenay river could not be navigated from the Columbia through to the Nelson Arm, as it was blocked by Bonnington Falls. In place of steamboat navigation, in the early 1890s a railroad, the Columbia and Kootenay was being built along the Kootenay River from Sproats Landing on the Columbia eastward to Nelson on Kootenay Lake.

Once the rail supplies were loaded, the trip down the Columbia and the lakes began on July 3, 1890, at 11:30 a.m., as crowds cheered on the dock and the nearby steamer Kootenai. Three of the principals of the Columbia and Kootenay Steam Navigation had supplied most of the money for the construction of the Lytton and two of them, J. A. Mara and Frank Barnard were on board for the steamer's first trip.

Revelstoke was 28 miles (45 km) up the Columbia River from the head of the upper Arrow Lake. On her first trip, Lytton took three hours to cover this distance, reaching the upper lake at 2:30 in the afternoon of July 3. This was still considered good time, as the steamer had encountered mechanical problems on the way down, forcing the vessel to stop. This was not surprising for a first run, and her actual steaming speed while underway had been 14 miles (23 km) an hour, which was helped by the swift flowing current in the river, ranging between 3 and 7 miles per hour.

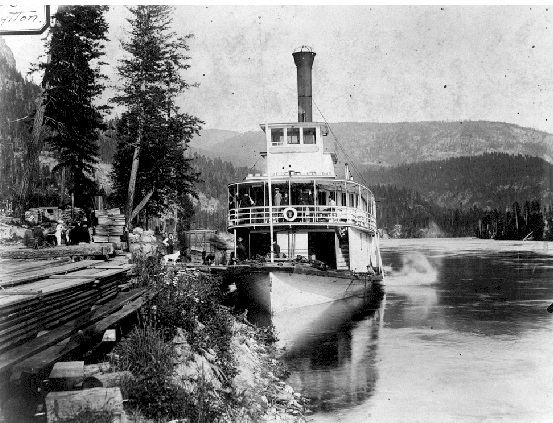
Lytton at Sproats Landing, BC, on lower Arrow Lake

Upper Arrow Lake opened up wide and deep after the Columbia River, and Lytton traversed the entire lake by 6:30 p.m. on the evening of July 3. After this point came the Narrows, a 16-mile (26 km) stretch of shallow water which lay between the upper and lower Arrow Lakes. After a stop for fuel (called "wooding up"), Lytton passed through the Narrows, reaching the head of the lower lake at 8:10 p.m. The vessel continued steaming down the lake into the night, reaching Sproat's Landing five and one-half hours later. Lytton's actual steaming time subtracting delays was 12.33 miles per hour, and was considered good speed. On the return trip up the river and the lakes, Lytton covered the entire 150 miles (240 km) back to Revelstoke in 13.75 hours, for an average speed of 11 miles per hour up river, also considered good.

=== Connection between transcontinental rail lines ===
On August 15, 1890, a railroad, the Spokane Falls and Northern been built up to Northport, then called Little Dalles (not to be confused with the other Little Dalles north of Revelstoke.) This railroad connected with the Northern Pacific and there would shortly be a link to the Great Northern at Spokane. There were however no rail links in the Kootenay region between these transcontinental lines and the Canadian Pacific Railway, and steamers on the Arrow Lakes, including the Lytton were for a time the only connections between the railhead at Northport and the C.P.R. 150 miles (240 km) north at Revelstoke. From 1890 to 1897, Lytton was operated on the Arrow Lakes route between Revelstroke and Northport, Washington, although the northern terminus changed to Wigwam, BC as the C.P.R. built an extension south down the eastern bank of the Columbia north of upper Arrow Lake.

=== Mining boom transport ===
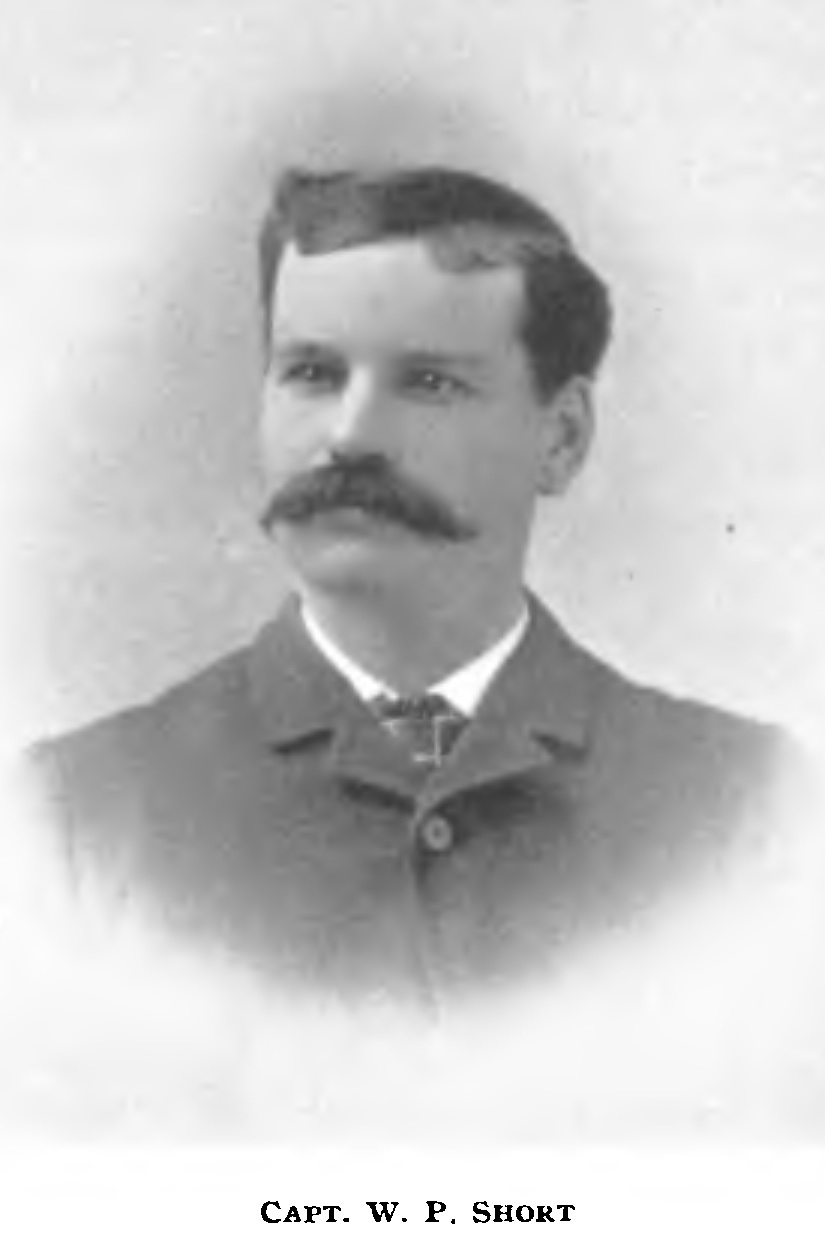
W.P. Short, an early captain of Lytton

This became especially important when in the same month that mountains that Lytton was taken on her first voyage, the fabulous Le Roi mining claim was staked at Red Mountain near Trail, B.C. Over 6 million tons of lead/zinc/tin and gold ore were taken out of the claim, worth more than $125 million. One stakeholder bought his stake for $12.50 and sold it for $30,000. The resulting ore boom created a demand for steamboat and rail transportation to the mines near Trail and other parts of the Kootenay mountains. Lytton became part of the ore boom, hauling ore barges to the smelter at Trail.

=== Runs up to Dalles des Morts (Death Rapids) on the Columbia ===
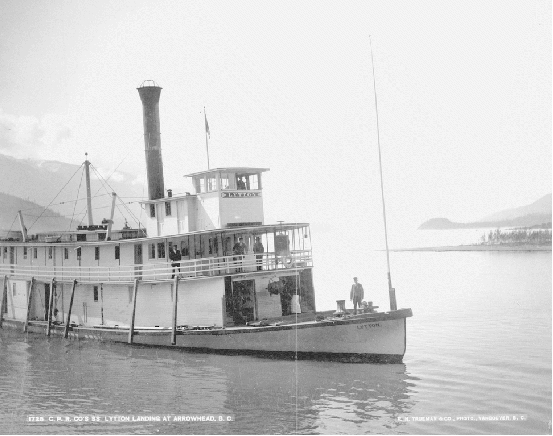
Lytton at Arrowhead, BC on upper Arrow Lake

From 1897 to 1901, when the water was high enough Lytton was worked on the Columbia above Revelstoke to La Porte, which was at a place called Dalles des Morts, or in English, Death Rapids. Lytton was the first steamboat to work the Columbia River above Revelstoke after the Forty-Nine in the 1860s and 1870s. One difficult stretch of water, called the Little Dalles, took Lytton six hours to work through upriver. Coming down, the run was timed with a stopwatch, and took only 6 minutes and 51 seconds.

=== Ferry operations on lower Arrow Lake ===
From 1898 to 1902 functioned as a ferry and towboat on the south end of lower Arrow Lake between Robson, BC and Robson West. This involved pushing barges across the lake loaded with rail cars and engines run out onto tracks mounted on the barges, and supported the work being done to extend the Columbia and Kootenay Railway westward from Castlegar, BC to Grand Forks and Midway. Lytton continued in ferry service until replaced by a bridge in March 1902.

== Dismantled ==
Historian Affleck summed up Lytton as "a very hard working, profitable vessel." Lytton lasted over ten years, which was a long time for a heavily worked wooden steamboat on frontier river. After the end of her service life, Lytton was beached above Robson. In 1904, Lytton was dismantled. Some houses in Burton, BC were constructed with materials from the vessel's hull.

== See also ==
- Canadian Pacific Railway Lake and River Service
