= Needles, British Columbia =

Needles
- Landing
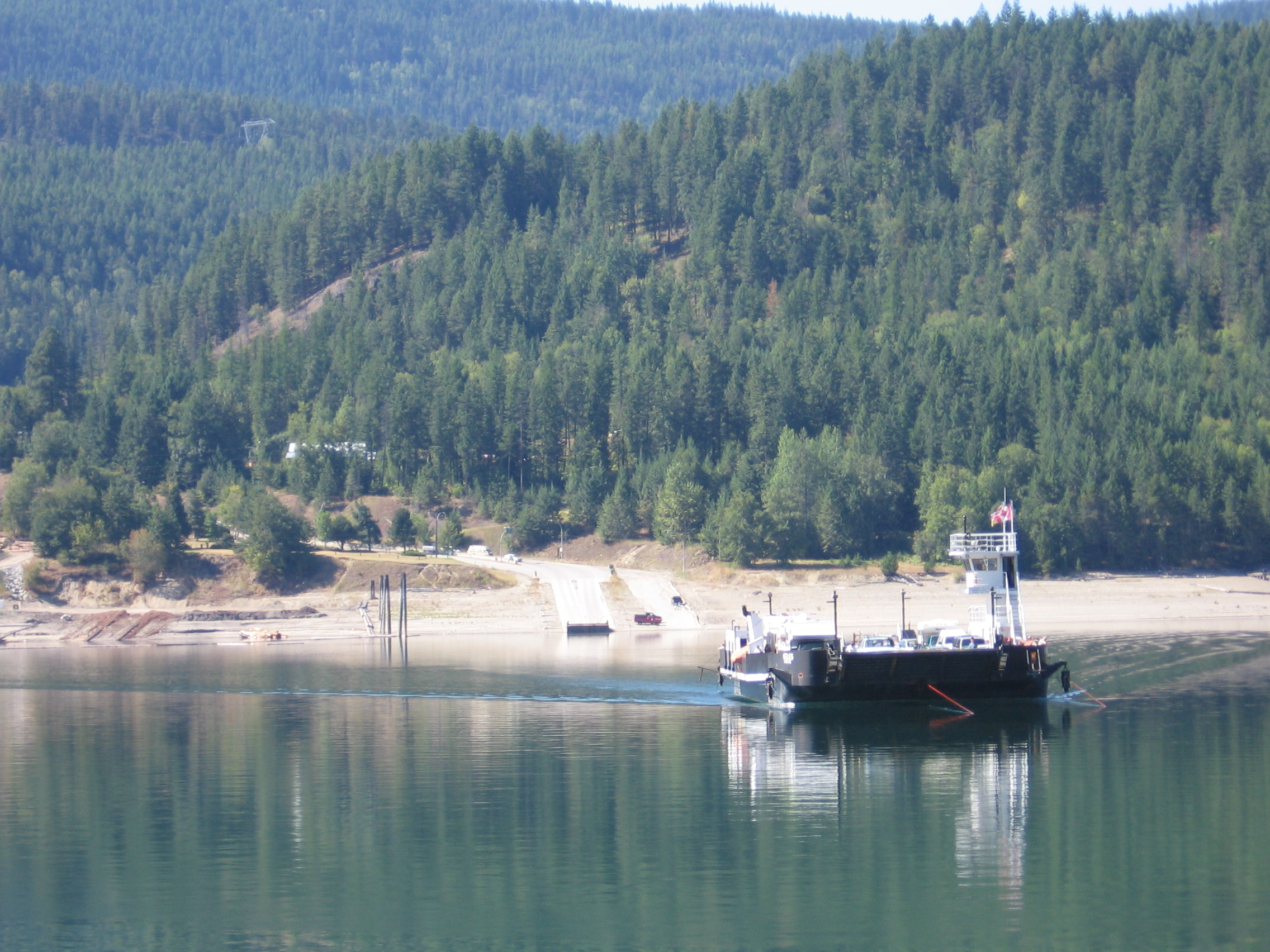

- Location of Needles in British Columbia
- Coordinates: 49°52′24″N 118°06′03″W
- Country: Canada
- Province: British Columbia
- Regional District: Central Kootenay
- Area codes: 250, 778, 236, & 672
- Highways: Highway 6

Needles is an unincorporated locality on the west shore of Lower Arrow Lake in the West Kootenay region of southeastern British Columbia. The western terminal for the Needles Ferry to Fauquier, the landing on Highway 6 is 108 kilometres (67 mi) east of Lumby, and 60 kilometres (37 mi) southwest of Nakusp.

== Name origin ==
The landing was formerly known as The Needles because of the long thin sand spits that stretch out into the lake, but Needles became more widely accepted after 1906. The former remained the official name of the narrows.

== Former settlement ==
Needles was an area of fruit trees and scrub farming, with the ferry operating since 1913. The Canadian Pacific Railway steamers on the Arrowhead–Robson route served the landing. However, the Needles Ranch was on the east side of the lake at Fauquier. In the early 1930s, a post office, general store, and school served the 200 residents of Needles.

== Flooded ==
The original Needles townsite was submerged when the reservoir for the Keenleyside Dam flooded the area in 1968. The ferry terminals on both sides of the lake were rebuilt at the time. Established on higher ground in 1932, the cemetery is all that remains.

== Accidents ==
In 2019, a ferry crew observed a submerged pickup truck just off the Needles ferry landing. Police divers recovered the body of a 60-year-old man. That year, a 35-year-old man, who abandoned his pickup truck at Fauquier, was missing for over a year, before his remains were discovered along the shoreline to the north.

== Services ==
Plum Hollow Camping is about 2 kilometres (1 mi) north on the gravel road.
