= Kootenai (sternwheeler) =

Sternwheel steamboat

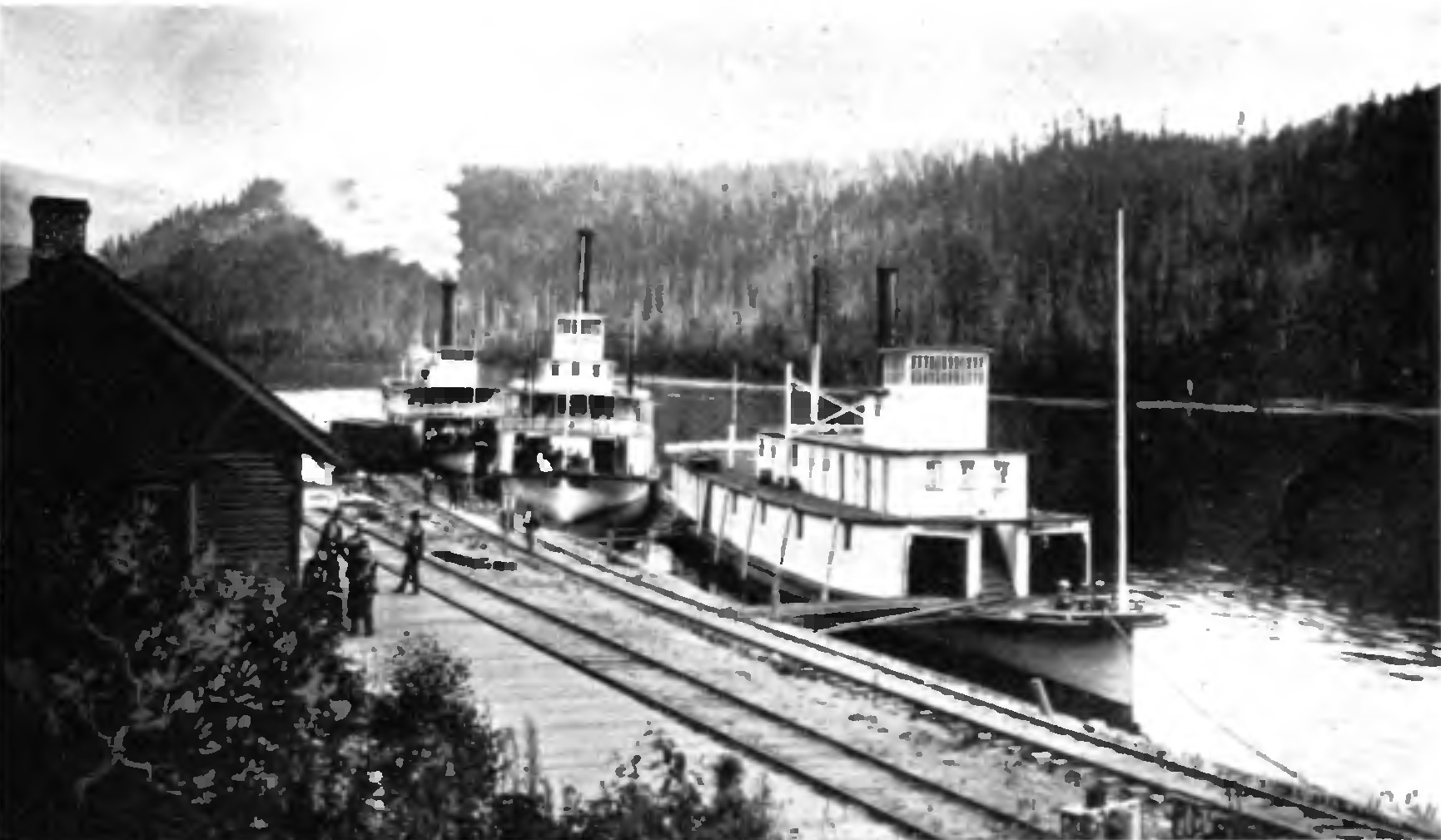
- sternwheelers Lytton (in distance), Columbia (center), and Kootenai(on right) at Robson, BC, sometime between 1890 and 1894

History

Canada
- Name: Kootenai
- Owner: Henderson & McCarthy; Columbia & Kootenay Steam Navigation Co.
- Route: Arrow Lakes
- Builder: Northport, Washington
- Launched: April 25 or 27, 1885
- Maiden voyage: May 7, 1885
- In service: 1885 (laid up 1886-1890)
- Out of service: 1895
- Identification: US 14436
- Fate: Sank near Wigwam, BC, raised and scrapped

General characteristics
- Type: inland shallow-draft boat passenger/freighter
- Tonnage: 371 gross; 269 net
- Length: 139 ft (42 m)
- Beam: 22 ft (7 m)
- Depth: 5.0 ft (2 m) depth of hold
- Installed power: steam engines manufactured 1877 by Willamette Iron Works of Portland, Oregon, twin single-cylinder, horizontally mounted, 14" bore by 60" stroke, 13 horsepower nominal
- Propulsion: sternwheel

Kootenai was a sternwheel steamboat that ran on the Arrow Lakes in British Columbia from 1885 to 1895. Kootenai was the second sternwheeler to run on the Arrow Lakes. This vessel should not be confused with the similarly named Kootenay, an 1897 sternwheeler that also ran on the Arrow Lakes.

== Design and construction ==
The firm of Paquet & Smith built the vessel's frames in Portland, Oregon of Douglas fir. The frames were then shipped to the Little Dalles (now known as Northport), in the Washington Territory on the Columbia River near the border with British Columbia. Once the frames arrived, Henderson and McCartney, contractors for the Canadian Pacific Railway and shipbuilder E.G. Thompson assembled the rest of the hull with planks and timbers sawn on site from the local pine. The steamboat's engines were third hand, having been built in 1877 by Willamette Iron Works in Portland, Oregon, and previously installed in the McMinnville, running on the lower Columbia River, and the Pend Oreille Lake steamer Katie Hallett.

== Operations on Arrow Lakes route ==
Steam navigation on the inland waters of northern inland Washington and southeastern British Columbia was seasonal and took place generally from May 15 to October 30 of each year. This was because ice or low water blocked river and lake travel at other times. Companies endeavored to launch steamboats early in the year to take advantage of the working season. The launch of Kootenai in late April 1885, and her first voyage in May was an example of this seasonally driven timing.

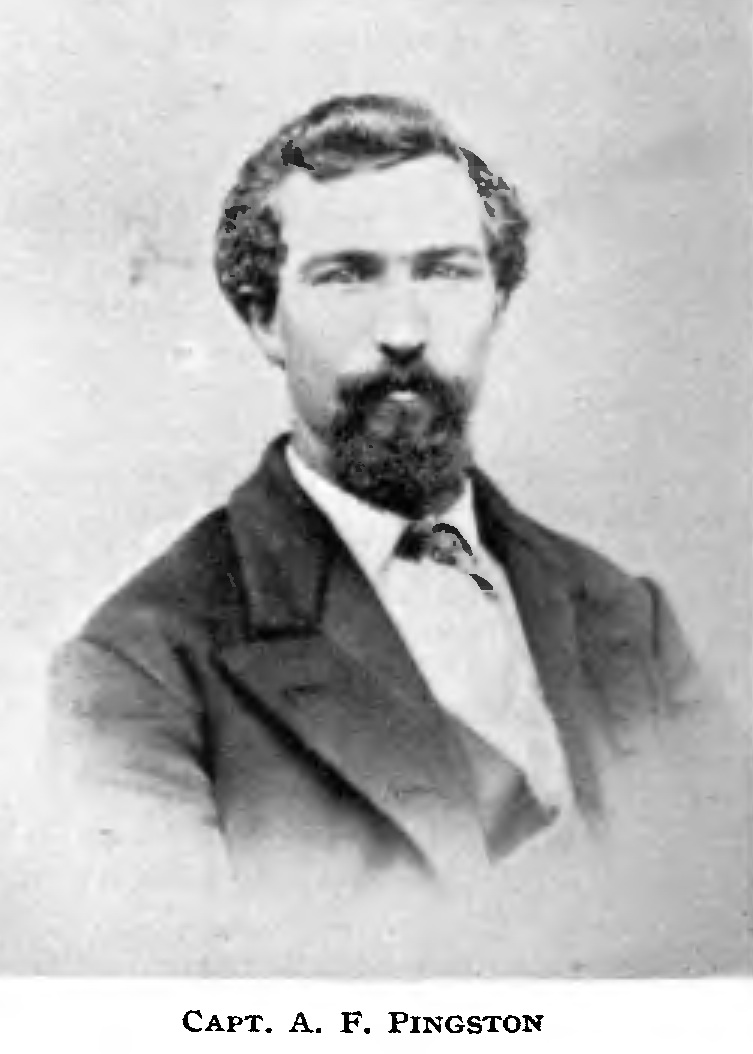
A. F. Pingston, first captain of Kootenai

On May 7, 1885, Captain A.L. Pingston (sometimes spelled "Pingstone") who had also served as captain of Forty-Nine some ten or fifteen years before, took Kootenai on her first trip north up the Columbia River into British Columbia, carrying supplies and building equipment for the construction of the Canadian Pacific Railway. This route went north through the lower and upper Arrow Lakes and then further north up the Columbia to the town of Farwell, later known as Revelstoke. Farwell was a key location on the route of the C.P.R. as the place where the transcontinental line crossed the Columbia River. The first run up the river and lakes took Kootenai thirty hours. Other than the Forty-Nine in the 1870s, and the small steam launches Midge and, possibly, Alpha in 1884 and 1885, no other steamboats had made this run. On the first run Captain Pingston had to look for the channel and negotiate work up through rapids by attaching a line to a tree or rock on the bank and cranking the steamer upstream using the capstan. Later trips took less time as the crew and captain became more accustomed to the route.

On September 4, 1885, Kootenai ran on the rocks at Little Dalles, but was salvaged. Kootenai was laid up for the winter at Little Dalles. Captain Pingston was accidentally shot and killed on April 27, 1886, and Kootenai made only one run to Revelstoke that year, under Capt. Nathaniel Lane. After that, Kootenai was laid up until 1890, when she was purchased by the Columbia and Kootenay Steam Navigation Company for $10,000 in promissory notes. The new owners worked Kootenai in the first part of the season of 1890 as a passenger and freight boat, making enough money in the first few trips to pay off the notes. When the sternwheeler Lytton came into service later in the 1890 season, Kootenai was used mostly as freight boat. Kootenai made 27 trips up and down the lakes in the 1890 season, starting on May 13 and ending on August 12.

== Sunk, raised, and dismantled ==
On December 3, 1895, Kootenai ran onto a rock near Bannock Point and Wigwam, BC on Upper Arrow Lake. Although the steamer was floated off, the vessel was not considered worth repairing. Kootenai was towed to Nakusp, BC and dismantled. The steamer's machinery and fittings were used in building the sternwheeler Trail.
