= SS Columbia (1896) =

Screw driven tug boat operated between 1896 and 1920 in British Columbia Canada

History

Canada
- Name: Columbia
- Owner: Columbia and Kootenay Steam Navigation Company, Canadian Pacific Railway
- Route: Columbia River and Arrow Lakes
- Builder: Thomas J. Bulger
- Launched: 1896
- Acquired: Canadian Pacific Railway in 1897
- Maiden voyage: 1896
- In service: 1896-1920
- Out of service: 1920
- Fate: Scrapped
- Notes: not to be confused of the 1920 tugboat of the same name

General characteristics
- Class & type: Screw-driven tug
- Tonnage: 50 GT 34 NT
- Length: 77 feet (23 m)
- Beam: 15 feet (4.6 m)
- Depth: 6 feet (1.8 m)
- Installed power: 19.5nhp compound 2-cylinder steam engine
- Speed: 11 miles per hour (18 km per hour)

SS Columbia was a large screw-driven tugboat that operated on the Arrow Lakes and Columbia River in British Columbia, Canada from 1896 to 1920.

== History ==
SS Columbia was built in 1896 at Nakusp, British Columbia for the increased freight traffic between Nakusp and Arrowhead due to the completion of the Nakusp and Slocan Railway. Her builder was Thomas J. Bulger, a prominent shipwright for the Canadian Pacific Railway Lake and River Service in British Columbia. The tug was registered number 103892 and was fit with a 19.5nhp compound 2-cylinder steam engine manufactured by John Daly of Toronto.

At the time of her launch the Columbia was the only screw-drive tugboat in the Columbia & Kootenay Steam Navigation Company fleet. In 1896, the Canadian Pacific Railway took ownership of the Columbia & Kootenay Steam Navigation Company and their entire fleet, including the Columbia tugboat. Several screw propulsion tugs would later be built by the CPR for use on Arrow Lakes.

Columbia was a valued part of the fleet because she was able to lighten the cargo burden from the sternwheelers by moving rail car barges loaded with cargo.

Despite the central role she once played, the Columbia was scrapped in 1920. Her machinery went to her replacement, a tug also called Columbia, built in 1920.
