= SS Widget =

History

Canada
- Name: Widget
- Owner: Canadian Pacific Railway
- Route: Arrow Lakes
- Builder: Ivan Horie, Vancouver
- Launched: 1948
- Acquired: 1948
- Maiden voyage: February 1, 1948
- In service: February 1 to late April 1948
- Out of service: Late April 1948

General characteristics
- Class & type: Diesel Tug
- Tonnage: 9 gross, 6 registered
- Length: 36.5 feet (11.1 m)
- Beam: 9.5 feet (2.9 m)
- Depth: 4.8 feet (1.5 m)
- Installed power: Desil

SS Widget was a diesel tugboat that operated on the Arrow Lakes in British Columbia, Canada. She was built by Ivan Horie in Vancouver, British Columbia in 1948.

She was chartered by the Canadian Pacific Railway company to fill in until a replacement for SS Columbia (1920–1947), which had a damaged hull, could be acquired. Widget was only used from February 1, 1948, to late April of that year.
