= Edgewood, British Columbia =

Edgewood
- Location of Edgewood in British Columbia
- Coordinates: 49°46′59″N 118°07′59″W
- Country: Canada
- Province: British Columbia
- Region: Arrow Lakes, West Kootenay
- Regional District: Central Kootenay
- Postal code: V0G 1J0
- Area codes: 250, 778, 236, & 672

Edgewood is a settlement on the west shore of Lower Arrow Lake in the West Kootenay region of southeastern British Columbia. The former steamboat landing is between the mouths of Inonoaklin Creek and Eagle Creek. The locality, off BC Highway 6, is by road about 136 kilometres (85 mi) southeast of Vernon and 76 kilometres (47 mi) by road and ferry southwest of Nakusp.

== Killarney becomes Edgewood ==
The first known references to Killarney as the initial steamboat stop were in 1893. Under construction that year, this government wharf served settlers heading into the Fire Valley. In 1890, a townsite was surveyed at the landing, but damage to the partially built wharf from the 1894 flooding of Eagle Creek ended plans to build a hotel and store. In 1899, Thomas McCardell preempted 320 acres (130 ha) across the creek to the north, the family being the first settlers in the immediate vicinity. When a precise name was needed for the latter on opening the post office, the Edgewood Dairy Co. in Fire Valley inspired the name. In 1902, McCardell was the inaugural postmaster, but the family left in 1905, abandoning their property. When a floating dock was hauled up river and installed at Edgewood in 1907, the nearby Killarney landing was abandoned. Over the next two years, the federal government built a new Edgewood wharf. A 1921 BC government reference to Edgewood as a relatively new town, replacing Killarney, suggests the names were used interchangeably for a period.

== Early community ==
A townsite was established in 1908, with a further subdivision in 1911 encompassing land about 3 kilometres (2 mi) westward and southward. The main settlement was about 1.6 kilometres (1 mi) north of the mouth of Inonoaklin Creek.

In 1909, Leonard Heaton was the inaugural teacher. In 1919, a new schoolhouse was built. Ferret Road was the boundary line between the Fire Valley and Edgewood school districts. The 1946 implementation of the 1945 Cameron Report into BC school financing and administration created centralized larger districts. The establishment of School District 10 Arrow Lakes included the dissolving of such local school boards. As a consequence, Edgewood school captured the lower grades in the general area, while grades 6–7 attended Inonoaklin Valley, and the higher ones went to Needles. In 1949, The Valley school closed, and the other two schools expanded.

The government wagon road to Needles, and the two-storey, 12-room Edgewood Hotel, opened in 1909. That year, William J. Banting operated a store in a tent on the beach, erected a permanent general store, and became postmaster, a role commonly performed by a storeowner in such places. He held both roles until his death in 1951. Around 1911, he built a larger store and a warehouse. The upper level of the latter comprised a hall used for church services, dances, social functions and showing movies. A 1917 fire destroyed both buildings, but he rebuilt a larger store.

In 1913, the hotel was remodelled and enlarged. In 1915, the place was renamed the Arrow Lake Hotel. By 1922, it comprised 24 bedrooms upstairs. In 1929, Arrow Inn was the rename. In 1955, fire destroyed the property.

Edgewood Pavilion, a.k.a. Naylor Hall, opened in 1915, and burned down in 1942.

J.N. Mcleod and Jack Dority opened Edgewood Cash Grocery in 1924, and a garage in the early 1930s. The partnership dissolved when Dority relocated around 1935. Oscar Forslund also operated a garage during this era. Fuel arrived by boat in drums for the store gas pumps. After his father's death, son Jack ran the store, which the new building replaced in 1967.

In 1932, a new community hall opened, but no longer existed 15 years later. In 1935, John Egloff opened a hall on his property about a mile northwest of Edgewood. The hall was used for social events and showing movies. A cheese factory occupied the basement. A 1941 fire destroyed the building.

In 1912, the Edgewood Rural Telephone Co. began local service. The next year, the Dominion Government Telegraph Service opened the line to Nakusp. The link to Castlegar opened in 1917, providing a connection to the BC Tel line to Nelson. In 1961, BCTel bought the phone company.

In 1947, a three-bed Red Cross outpost opened. In 2011, the facility became the Edgewood Health Centre.

In 1952, the completion of the Whatshan Dam brought electricity to the valley. Television came in the early 1960s.

== Donselaar Memorial Park ==
Around 1912, Dr. Basil Church bought the property, which he cleared as a cow pasture.

During World War I, the government leased the site as an internment camp for civilian immigrants, classified as enemy aliens. The closure of the Fire Valley camp triggered the fall 1916 opening.

After the war, the property was occupied intermittently. The local sports committee leased the land for ball games, which required extensive levelling. In 1958, a hall was built. In 1969–70 came a new ball diamond, grandstand, and various amenities. In 1973, the grounds were dedicated as the E.J. Donselaar Memorial Park.

In 2009, a memorial plaque commemorating Ukrainian-Canadian imprisonment was unveiled.

In the mid-2010s, a proposal to create a museum in the area, which would focus upon the internment camp operations that closed in 1917, received a lukewarm local reception.

== Cemetery ==
In 1911, Baby Hughes was the first burial at this site originally designated for a school. In 1915, a board of trustees was elected. In 1921, the Ministry of Education relinquished the land. Initially called Woodlands, the name changed to Edgewood Cemetery Company. A chain link fence surrounds the property at the west end of Cemetery Rd. Of the three Jowett brothers buried, Walter and Wilfrid were centenarians, and William Bernard reached 91.

== Accidents & tragedies ==
1913: A couple and their baby died in a house blaze.

Early 1940s: A man drowned in a boating accident on the lake.

1972: Two of the six victims fatally shot by an escapee from a psychiatric hospital were camping at Edgewood.

1979: A hiker, who became lost in dense bush on Eagle Creek, died of exposure, the remains being discovered eight months later.

2009: An apparent murder-suicide occurred.

== Later community ==
The former Edgewood townsite became a ghost town when the reservoir for the Keenleyside Dam submerged the locality and shore road to Needles in 1968. A new three-room ATCO style school catering to grades 1–7 opened on a 4.1 acres (1.7 ha) site on the edge of new Edgewood between the two creeks. Grades 8–12 were bused to Nakusp. In 1983, a new school building was opened. In 1967, the stone cenotaph (1920) was disassembled and rebuilt in the park. Reburied was a glass container holding a two cent Belgian coin and a copy of the Nelson News for 22 May 1920. Appropriate 1967 items were added. In 1968, the Royal Canadian Legion hall (1949) was moved. St. Agnes Anglican church (1913) was demolished and a new church built.

In December 2006, Inonoaklin Edgewood Broadband launched the local internet service. In 2013, BC Hydro built a new boat launch.

The Edgewood Volunteer Fire Department, formed in the mid-2010s, acquired a 1993 Volvo FE42/Superior pumper. The local legion donated land, and the Regional District of Central Kootenay gave $165,000. After fundraising efforts, the firehall neared completion at the end of 2018.

Other infrastructure comprises a general store/post office/gas bar, credit union, elementary school and legion hall. The Lower Inonoaklin Falls are at the foot of Inonoaklin Valley Road.

== See also ==
- "1899 Kootenay map". www.library.ubc.ca. p. 1.
- "1925 BC map". www.davidrumsey.com.
- "1956 BC map". www.davidrumsey.com.
- 2025 Canadian ostrich culling controversy
