= Forty-Nine (steamboat) =

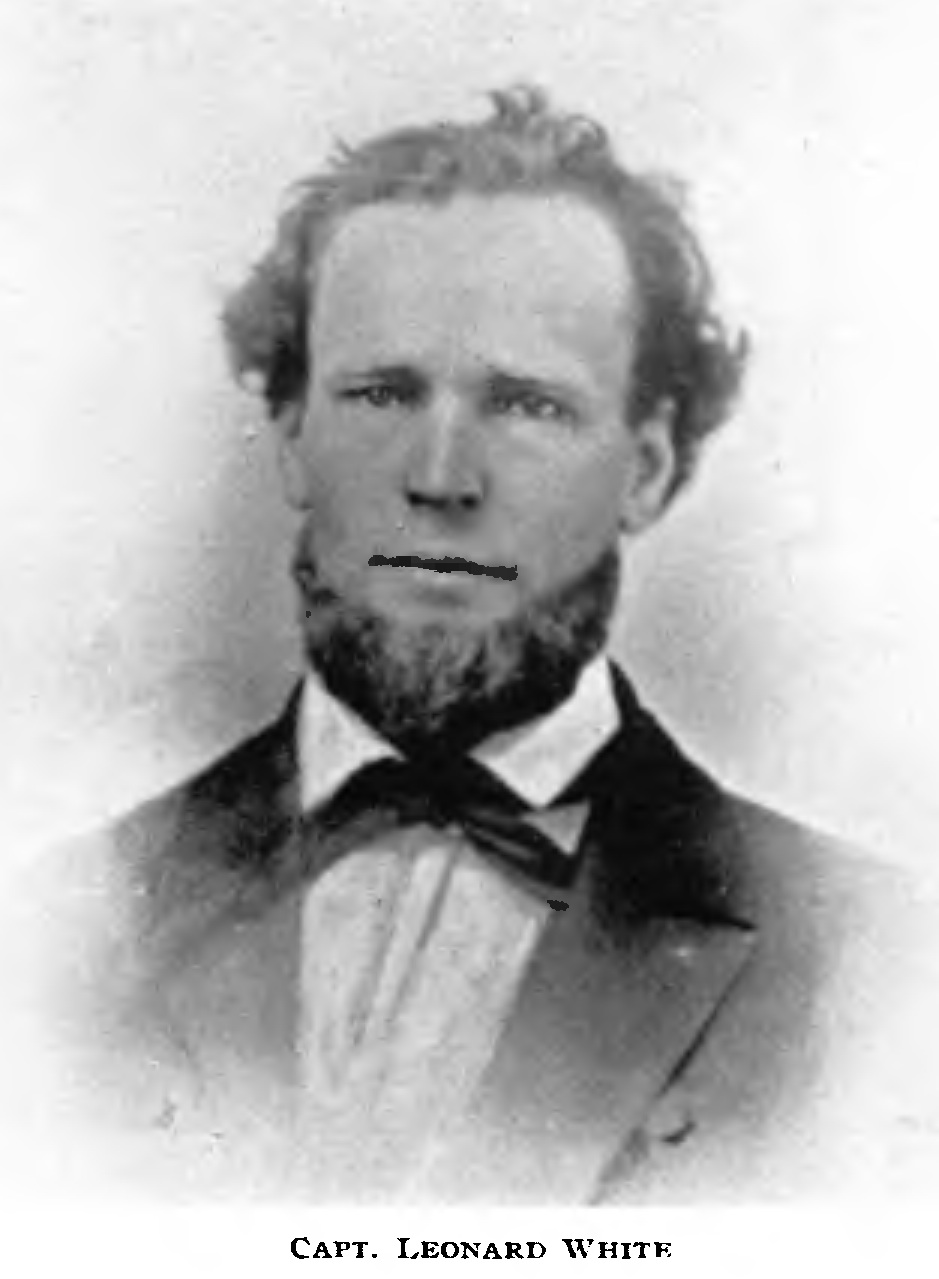
Leonard White, captain of the Forty-Nine

The Forty-Nine was a steamboat that operated from the mid-1860s to the early 1870s in today's West Kootenay region of southeastern British Columbia.

== Construction ==
Transportation to the Big Bend Gold Rush in the Colony of British Columbia was not being served by chartered vessels. To address that need, the Forty-Nine was built using the engine from the scrapped SS Jennie Clark, dating from 1855. Largely missing the mining season, the launch occurred in November, 1865.

== Name origin ==
Built about 18 miles (29 km) south of the Canada–United States border at Little Dalles, the vessel was named for the border, which is often called the "49th parallel" because it largely follows that latitude north. Equally, each voyage would cross that border en route to the boomtown of La Porte, a principal landing at the foot of the Dalles des Morts or "Death Rapids". This navigable head of river was in the immediate vicinity of the goldfields on Goldstream River and nearby creeks.

== Voyages ==
On the maiden voyage, Captain Leonard White carried passengers and freight north up the Columbia River and into the Arrow Lakes. About halfway to La Porte, typical winter ice blocked the passage. Unable to break through the heavy ice in the narrows between the two Arrow Lakes, passengers disembarked, and the boat returned south.

In April 1866, Captain White returned north carrying 73 passengers and 15 tons of freight. To break through ice on Upper Arrow Lake, boards nailed to the bow acted as an ice-breaker. Reaching clear water after five or six miles, later river ice proved less challenging. Charging passengers $25 each, and freight at $200 per ton, that first season paid for the vessel. The 265 miles (426 km) to La Porte was covered in 10 days. The gold rush ended that year, but conflicting accounts exist as to the number of trips completed from Marcus, Washington Terr. Sources mention three, four, or 37.

The final southbound run from La Porte allegedly carried only three paying passengers, but free passage was provided for miners who could not afford the fare. After striking a floating log near Little Dalles, Washington, the season ended with docking for repairs at the Colville River near Marcus, just above Kettle Falls. The one trip to the Big Bend in November 1867 returned with 90 miners. A single trip occurred the next year.

Meanwhile, voyages to different destinations followed other gold strikes, such as the one on Forty-nine Creek near Nelson. In 1869, Captain White retired in ill health, and First Mate A.F. Pingston assumed command. That fall, the steamer ran aground near Steamboat Riffle in the Big Bend area. Refloated in 1870, and returned south for repairs, she operated intermittently, such as supplying the Canadian Pacific Railway survey in the Selkirk Mountains undertaken by Walter Moberly in November 1871. A final trip to La Porte was made at that time.

No known pictures exist.
