= Robson, British Columbia =

Unincorporated community in southeastern British Columbia

Coordinates: 49°20′4″N 117°41′29″W

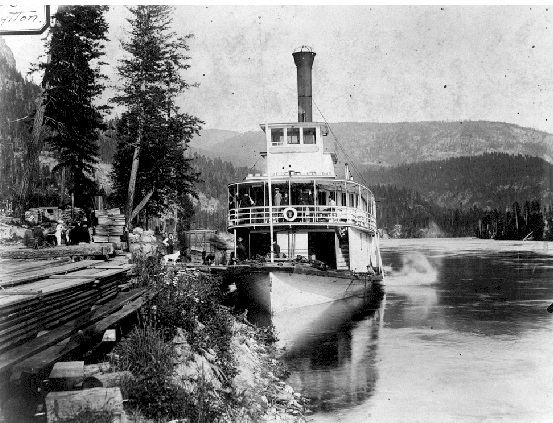

Robson is an unincorporated community in the West Kootenay region of southeastern British Columbia. The former steamboat landing and railway terminal is on the northeast side of the Columbia River. The residential area is off Broadwater Road, within the northwest part of Greater Castlegar.

== Established ==
In 1888, civil servant Gilbert Malcolm Sproat set aside a half-section of land for a government reserve. The water deeper, and high banks protecting the shore from flooding, the location was about 1.6 kilometres (1 mi) upstream from the Norns (formerly Pass) Creek delta. Bordering in 1890, the Canadian Pacific Railway (CP) acquired around 70 acres about 2 kilometres (1.2 mi) from the creek. The location was named after Premier John Robson for his support of CP endeavours. In 1891, the CP's Columbia and Kootenay Railway (C&K) reached its new western terminal. C&K opened a depot, installed a turntable, and ran tracks along the new steamboat dock.

== Flourished ==
Sproat's Landing diminished and Robson flourished. For overnight stays and mail, Louis Levesque was hotelier and postmaster. Otherwise, passengers transferred directly from train to sternwheeler. Freight cars rolled onto barges. The 206 kilometres (128 mi) upstream route to Arrowhead connected with the spur from Revelstoke. However, low water and ice on the Arrow Lakes made the water route unreliable. In 1897, the CP built a C&K branch line from South Slocan up the Slocan Valley diverting much lake traffic from Robson. That year, the Columbia and Western Railway opened to West Robson on the opposite bank. Prior to the rail bridge, steamers and barges shuttled freight and passengers between the two Robsons. On timetables, and occasionally newspapers, the former terminal was called East Robson.

== Reinvented ==
On the 1902 completion of the rail bridge across the Columbia River at Sproat's Landing, West Robson became the ferry terminal, and businesses and residents relocated. East Robson was reinvented as commercial orchard lots. The name eventually reverted to simply Robson. The railway tracks to East Robson were soon lifted. However, the CP steamers continued to call at both Robsons until the withdrawal of all Arrow Lakes services in the mid-1950s.

By 1908, a general store opened, and that year the Baptists built a church and opened a school. Poultry farming intensified. In 1921, the school moved into the old hotel, which had been renovated. The orchards did not work out, but in 1919, the establishment of the Robson–Castlegar cable-guided reaction ferry developed Robson into a bedroom community for the larger centre. Ferry service ended in 1988. The 1994 opening of the Robson–Castlegar bridge restored a direct link.

== Recent decades ==
Since the dividing line between Robson and Raspberry to the east is debatable, Robson-Raspberry is the unofficial amalgamation for census and improvement district purposes. In 2014, Robson/Raspberry opened a new water treatment plant, ending two decades of being on a boil water advisory. That year, Johnny's Groceries and Gas experienced an armed robbery. In 2016, the craft beer put the Lion's Head Pub on British Columbia Magazine's list of top ten establishments.
