= SS Kootenay =

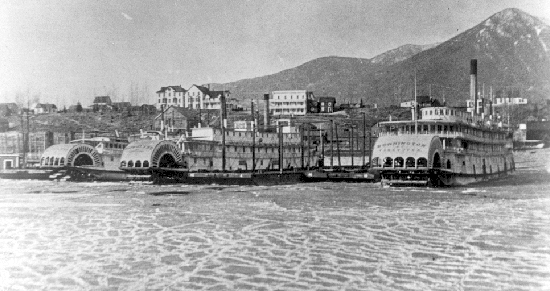
- Bonnington, Rossland, and Kootenay (sternwheelers) in ice at Nakusp ca 1911

History

Canada
- Name: Kootenay
- Namesake: Kootenay, British Columbia
- Owner: Canadian Pacific Railway
- Route: Arrowhead to Trail
- Builder: Thomas Bulger
- Launched: April 1897
- Maiden voyage: April 1897
- In service: 1897-1919
- Out of service: 1919
- Status: Abandoned at Crescent Bay, British Columbia

General characteristics
- Class & type: Sternwheeler
- Tonnage: 1117 gross, 732.5 net
- Length: 184 feet (56 m)
- Beam: 33 feet (10 m)
- Depth: 6 feet (1.8 m)
- Installed power: 21.6 horsepower

SS Kootenay was a Canadian Pacific Railway (CPR) wooden-hulled sternwheeler that serviced the Arrow Lakes in British Columbia, Canada from 1897 to 1919. She was a large freight and passenger steamship and the first in a series of CPR riverboats built for the Arrow Lakes.

== Construction ==
In the 1890s, CPR purchased the Columbia and Kootenay Steam Navigation Company (C&KSN), which had hitherto provided steam transportation services on the Arrow Lakes. Soon after the takeover, CPR commissioned a series of three new vessels to improve services on the lakes and expand traffic in the Slocan Valley during the prosperous years of the late 1800s. Kootenay was the first to be built and was a large, attractively designed riverboat almost identical to the earlier Nakusp, but slightly larger.

Kootenay was also considered a sister ship to Aberdeen, which ran on Okanagan Lake. Kootenay was built at Nakusp yard at Rosebery, near Slocan Lake, by Thomas Bulger and his workers. Kootenay was the largest steamer on the upper Columbia River until the launch of Bonnington in 1911 and had two passenger decks with large lounges and a dining saloon, a freight deck for fuel and cargo, and a wheelhouse. Her engines came from the sternwheeler William Irving, which had been wrecked on the lower Fraser River in 1894.

William Irving was considerably smaller than Kootenay, so the latter was underpowered and slow. However, she operated successfully for many years. She had an elaborate system of hog chains and cables to strengthen her wooden hull. Kootenay was launched in April, 1897 at Nakusp.

== Service years ==
With the addition of Kootenay, a large, modern vessel, to the Arrow Lakes service fleet, CPR was able to provide daily service to the surrounding communities. With the Nakusp, Kootenay traveled daily between Arrowhead and Trail. Other vessels were available for relief, freight, and to service the route from Trail south to Northport.

=== Renovation ===
During the lay-up period of the winter of 1908 to 1909, several Arrow Lake ships, including Kootenay, underwent renovations to accommodate the increased tourist traffic. On Rossland, the texas deck, or upper deck, was expanded to increase the number of staterooms, and Kootenay underwent a similar modification. The following winter, Minto was renovated as well. The cost of the work on Kootenay was $3159 CAD.

=== Winter 1916 ===
The winter of 1916 brought record low temperatures and heavy snowfalls. On January 11, Kootenay became stranded in ice near Cottonwood Island, at the head of Lower Arrow Lake. Minto brought the passengers to safety, but Kootenay remained stranded for several weeks and relied on wood cut on shore for fuel when coal ran out. Finally, she was able to break out by smashing open a channel with the paddlewheel. Although Kootenay survived, her hull was significantly damaged, which limited her future use.

=== Crew ===
Kootenay's crew in 1897 consisted of master W.E. Nesbitt, purser A.W. Shiels, chief engineer J.E. Jeffcott, pilot P. Wilson, first officer E.C. Bridgeman, second engineer J. Johnston, freight clerk Fred B. Wright, steward William Dyson, express messenger J.G. Millard, and bar manager J.S. Byron. By 1913, the captain had become G. Robertson and the chief engineer was A. Thompson.

== Retirement ==
Kootenay had a wooden hull, which proved to be a disadvantage because it required constant maintenance and easily became weak and waterlogged. New, steel-hulled steamers such as the Bonnington, launched in 1911, with improved passenger and cargo capacities, as well as an updated modern design. Kootenay was retired 1919 and sold in 1920. She was left to rot at Crescent Bay near Nakusp.

Despite the Kootenay's doomed fate, the steamships' historical significance and role in the development of the region remain evident, as Christmas cards bearing photos of the ships and crews with greetings have become valuable to collectors. In 2012, a Kootenay card from 1897 sold for US$162.50.

== See also ==
- Moyie (sternwheeler)
- Sicamous (sternwheeler)
