= Minto (sternwheeler) =

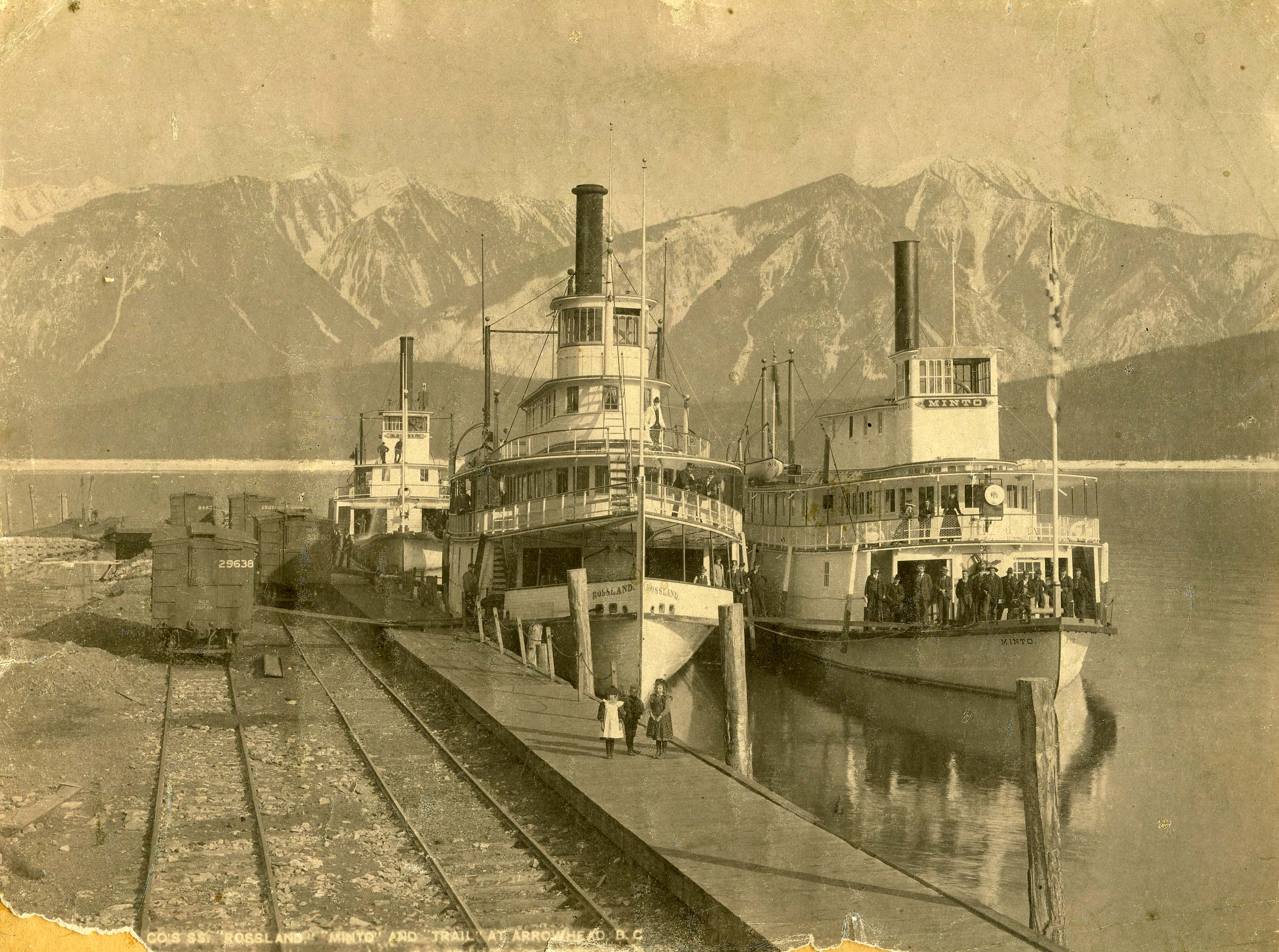
- Minto (on right), with Trail on left and Rossland in center, at Arrowhead between 1898 and 1900

History

Canada
- Name: Minto
- Owner: Canadian Pacific Railway
- Route: Arrow Lakes
- Builder: Thomas J. Bulger
- Laid down: July 28, 1898 (assembly of pre-manufactured components began)
- Launched: November 19, 1898, at Nakusp, BC
- Maiden voyage: November 19, 1898
- In service: 1898
- Out of service: 1954
- Identification: CAN 107453
- Fate: Deliberately burned August 1968 after attempts at conversion to museum failed
- Notes: near twin of Moyie

General characteristics
- Type: inland shallow-draft boat passenger/freighter
- Tonnage: 829 gross; 522 net
- Length: 161.7 ft (49 m)
- Beam: 30.1 ft (9 m)
- Depth: 5.1 ft (2 m) depth of hold
- Ice class: steel-sided hull allowed some ice navigation
- Installed power: coal-fired boiler generating steam at pressure of 175 lbs p.s.i., steam engines manufactured by Bertram Engineering Company of Toronto, Ontario, twin single-cylinder, horizontally mounted, 16" bore by 72" stroke, 17 horsepower nominal
- Propulsion: sternwheel
- Capacity: As of 1920: 13 staterooms, 400 passengers
- Crew: As of 1920, total of 33: Master, mate, pilot, nine deckhands, two engineers, three firemen, one coal passer, purser, freight clerk, chief steward, eleven assistant stewards and cooks

Minto was a sternwheel steamboat that ran on the Arrow Lakes in British Columbia from 1898 to 1954. In those years of service, Minto had steamed over 3.2 million kilometers serving the small communities on Arrow Lakes. Minto and her sister Moyie (which ran on Kootenay Lake) were the last sternwheelers to run in regularly scheduled passenger service in the Pacific Northwest. The "Minto" class of sailing dinghies is named after this vessel.

== Design and construction ==
=== Manufactured for the Stikine River service ===
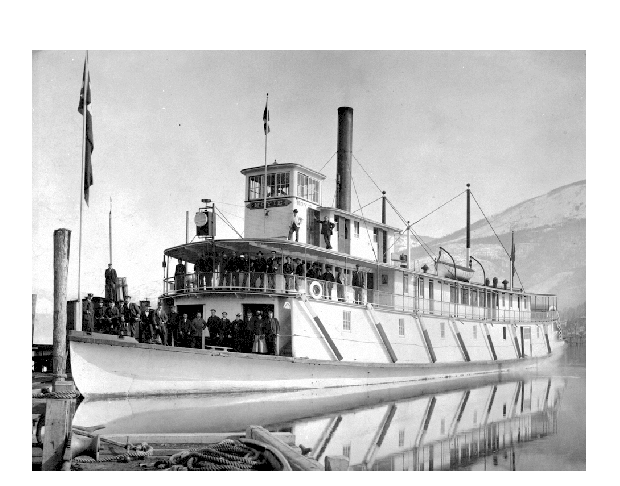
Moyie sistership of Minto, in 1898

Minto was one of three steamboats built of steel and wood that were intended for service on the Stikine River during the Klondike gold rush. The other vessels were Moyie and Tyrrell. The Canadian Pacific Railway, who commissioned the vessels, had hoped to develop an "All-Canada" route to the Yukon gold fields that bypassed the other routes, generally through Skagway, Dyea, or from St. Michael on the Bering Sea all the way up the long Yukon River. All the parts for these steamers were manufactured in Toronto, Ontario and shipped to the west coast of Canada for assembly.

=== Reassigned to Arrow Lakes ===
When the Stikine Route to the Klondike proved to be a failure in the first three months of its opening in 1898, the C.P.R. was left with a number of steamers, including Minto (then in a disassembled state) for which it needed to find routes. The C.P.R. decided to assemble Tyrrell in Vancouver, Moyie on Kootenay Lake, and Minto at the Bulger shipyard on upper Arrow Lake at Nakusp. Minto was needed on the Arrow Lakes because the C.P.R.'s big new steamer Nakusp had been destroyed by fire in 1897. It is possible that some preliminary assembly work was done on Moyie and Minto in Vancouver before they were shipped inland still in pieces. The construction program for the Stikine River service, and the eventually assembly of Minto and her sisters, was supervised by the veteran steamboat captain James W. Troup, the superintendent of C.P.R.'s Lake and River service. C.P.R. decided to assemble Moyie first, and her composite steel and wood hull was riveted together first at Nelson, BC. The assembly crew then moved over to Nakusp on upper Arrow Lake and on and then on July 26, 1898, began work on the Minto. Reportedly there were literally 1,000 pieces for each sternwheeler.

== Durable hull design ==
The hulls of Minto, Moyie and Tyrrell hull were built on steel frames, with a wood bottom and steel sheets on the side. This gave Minto some ability to handle ice conditions on the lake, better than the wooden-hulled Nakusp, thus allowing operations to continue later into the year, but even so it was the custom to push an ice-breaking barge ahead of her in wintry conditions where ice could be encountered. In addition, the composite hulls gave these vessels a much greater working life than all the other boats on both the Arrow Lakes and Kootenay Lakes. Wooden hulls quickly became waterlogged and lost their strength; Minto and Moyie did not have this weakness.

== Service on Arrow Lakes ==
When Minto was complete, C.P.R. had a total of five sternwheelers on Arrow Lakes, which besides Minto were the new express passenger lake boat Rossland, the new boat Kootenay and the older Trail and Lytton, and two steam tugs. Minto with her steel-sided hull, generally ran in the winter months, while the wooden-hulled Rossland and Kootenay ran more in the summer, when tourist traffic was greater and their vulnerable hulls were not threatened by ice.

== Additional cabins constructed ==
While Minto and Moyie were almost identical as built (Moyie was just slightly larger at 835 tons against the 829 of Minto), over the years there came to be more substantial differences, such as additional cabin space being added to Minto added in the winter off-season of 1909–1910. These involved extended the "texas" which the name for the cabin placed on the topmost or "hurricane" or "texas" deck. Similar work was done the year before on the Rossland and the Kootenay and images of all vessels can be roughly dated by comparison of the length of the Texas on each boat. In Minto's case, the additional cabins cost $2,953 to construct.

== Winter operations ==
Winter months imposed sharp restrictions on steamboat operations on the Arrow Lakes. Minto was the best of the fleet for dealing with these conditions, which could result in ice 10 inches thick across the entire upper lake. In some winters, Minto was unable to travel to lower Arrow Lake, and C.P.R. used the steam propeller passenger and tug boat Columbia to take her place. In the very cold winter of 1916, Kootenay became icebound at the southern end of the Narrows between upper and lower Arrow Lakes. Minto with her steel-sided hull, was sent down from Nakusp to take her passengers (fortunately there were not many). Minto could not reach Kootenay but was able to get close enough so the passengers could walk over the ice or on shore to get to Minto. Kootenay was eventually able to work free, but her hull was permanently damaged.

== Effect of the Great War ==
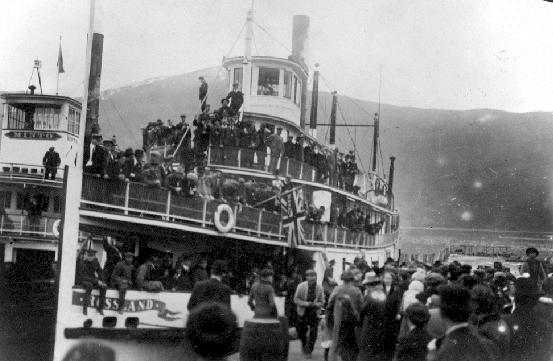
Rossland embarking troops, ca 1915, with Minto alongside.

Business on the Arrow Lakes fell off as a result of the Great War and the economic dislocations and labor shortages it caused. Improved rail access to the area diminished the importance of steamboats. Boats were taken out of service or lost by fire or sinking and not replaced.

== Decline of the steamers ==
By 1923, there were only two sternwheelers running on the Arrow Lakes, the very large Bonnington and the Minto. No more were built after 1914, although C.P.R. did effect renovations to Minto, adding 20 new staterooms in 1920 and replacing her boiler in 1929.

The Great Depression and changing travel patterns hit the Arrow Lakes hard. After the summer season of 1931, Bonnington was taken out of service and moored at Nakusp, and would never run again. This left only Minto and the tug Columbia running operations on the Arrow Lakes. During the summer, Minto made the complete run through the lakes from Arrowhead to Robson and back. During the winter, Minto worked on the upper lake, and Columbia served on the lower one.

== Survival to the 1950s ==
Both Minto and Moyie survived for a long time. She had a good crew who kept her in good condition, and some were long-term veterans on board. Walter Wright was her captain in the 1940s, and he had started out as a watchman on Minto's first voyage in 1898. While Minto and Moyie continued to function as genuine transportation links, they also became famous as a form of living history. People who loved steamboats came from all over North America to ride on them. The Saturday Evening Post published an article about Minto and the National Film Board made a motion picture about her. In 1947, summing up their later careers, Professor Mills wrote of Minto and Moyie:

That pair still survive, graying as they approach the half-century, but still doing their work, Moyie running from Proctor to Kaslo every Saturday, touching all the way landings informally, and bringing to little isolated lake settlements their mail, groceries, and visitors, stopping briefly to chat while the cargo is transferred, and going casually on. At noon everyone finds a place on deck, breaks out a lunch basket, and sets to, since the Moyie no longer has the refinement of a dining room. But Minto still has one and needs one, for her run is longer, the length of Arrow Lakes and a strip of the Columbia down to Robson, a trip lasting about two days. There were other stern-wheelers in the fleet, newer than the twins, but they did not have such powers of survival. Perhaps their names were too much for them -- Kooskanook, for example.

By 1954, of all the steamboats that had run in British Columbia, and all of Alaska and the Pacific Northwest, only two remained in regular passenger service, Moyie and Minto. The C.P.R. was losing $100,000 every year on its Arrow Lakes service, and the docks at Nakusp and Robson needed upgrading, which would have cost an additional $16,000. Minto herself would have needed an expenditure of $10,000 to pass her next inspection.

== Last run ==
On April 24, 1954, Minto made her last run on the Arrow Lakes. By then, Minto had steamed an estimated 40.2 million kilometers during her service life. That morning Minto left the dock at West Robson, BC on lower Arrow Lake, with flags and bunting flying, Captain Bob Manning in command and 150 passengers on board. All the staterooms were sold out. People came from all over British Columbia and beyond to ride with the Minto. One honored passenger was Mrs. Olivia Maitland, who had been on board the Minto fifty-six years before on the steamer's first voyage. Other officers were Reg Barlow, second engineer, his son Fred Barlow, first officer, Lawrence Exton, and Jack Edmonds, purser.

Departing from Robson, Minto stopped for the last time at all the small landings on the lake that she had always served. At Syringa Creek the retired postmaster, who had served for 50 years, handed over the mail one last time, then stood on the dock with his hat in his hand as the steamer pulled away. At Edgewood a crowd sang Auld Lang Syne while across the lake at Fullmore Point Jock Ford played a mournful song on the bagpipes. Captain Manning stopped the engines briefly so passengers could hear the pipes. At Burton the citizens placed a large cedar wreath on her bow. At Arrowhead, farmer John Nelson had posted an enormous sign that read "Let us honor the brave pioneers of navigation on the scenic Arrow Lakes by making it possible to continue the very efficient services of the S.S. Minto. Similar scenes occurred on other places along the route until Minto came back to Nakusp for the last time.

== Attempts at preservation fail ==
Minto, abandoned at Galena Bay, probably in the summer of 1968.

C.P.R. had no use for Minto, and sold her to the city of Nakusp for $1, with the original objective of converting her into a museum. This plan never materialized, and in April 1956, she was sold to a Nelson junk dealer for $750. The junker stripped everything out of Minto, furniture, boilers, engines and even the paddlewheel. There was nothing left except the hull and the empty cabins and pilot house. John Nelson, who had not much money, still wanted to do what he could to save Minto, so he bought what was left of her for $800 and had her towed to his farm up on the lake by Galena Bay. He had her beached, and did what he could to restore her, but because of his age and limited funds, he could not make much headway towards restoration of the vessel.

== Final destruction ==
Minto on fire, 1 August 1968.

On November 26, 1967, John Nelson died at the age of 88 years. Minto did not long survive him. Far down the lakes, the enormous Keenleyside Dam was being built that would rise 170 feet, and when complete, would raise all the lake levels, drowning the Narrows between the upper and lower Arrow Lakes, and submerging all the landings and many of the towns along the shore under water as much as 40 feet deep. BC Hydro which was building the dam, offered to move and restore Minto, but only if someone else paid the cost which was estimated at $100,000. John Nelson's son Walter didn't have the money and Minto's deteriorated condition after over ten years out of service did not seem to warrant any further effort to preserve her. On August 1, 1968, she was towed out into the lake to be deliberately burned. Walter Nelson, son of her last owner, lit the match to set fire to the boat, and in a few minutes, the vessel's upper works were consumed in the flames. The hull was later sunk.

== Sailing dinghy class Minto ==
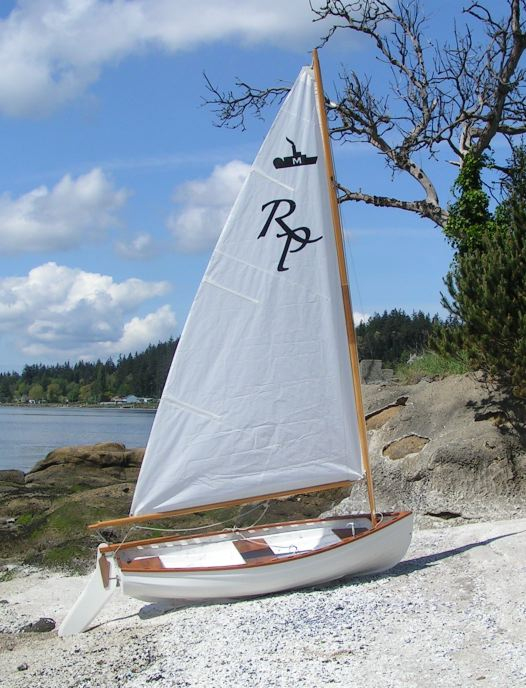
A Minto-class sailing dinghy, showing the steamboat emblem on the sail

Although the sternwheeler was gone, the name "Minto" was continued by the "Minto" class of sailing dinghies, which were built in the 1950s and 1960s. The shape of these small boats was supposedly inspired by a lifeboat carried on board the steamer Minto, and to memorialize this, the class symbol shown on the sail is a sternwheel steamboat.

== See also ==
- Canadian Pacific Railway Lake and River Service

== See also ==
- Moyie
