= Columbia (Arrow Lakes sternwheeler) =

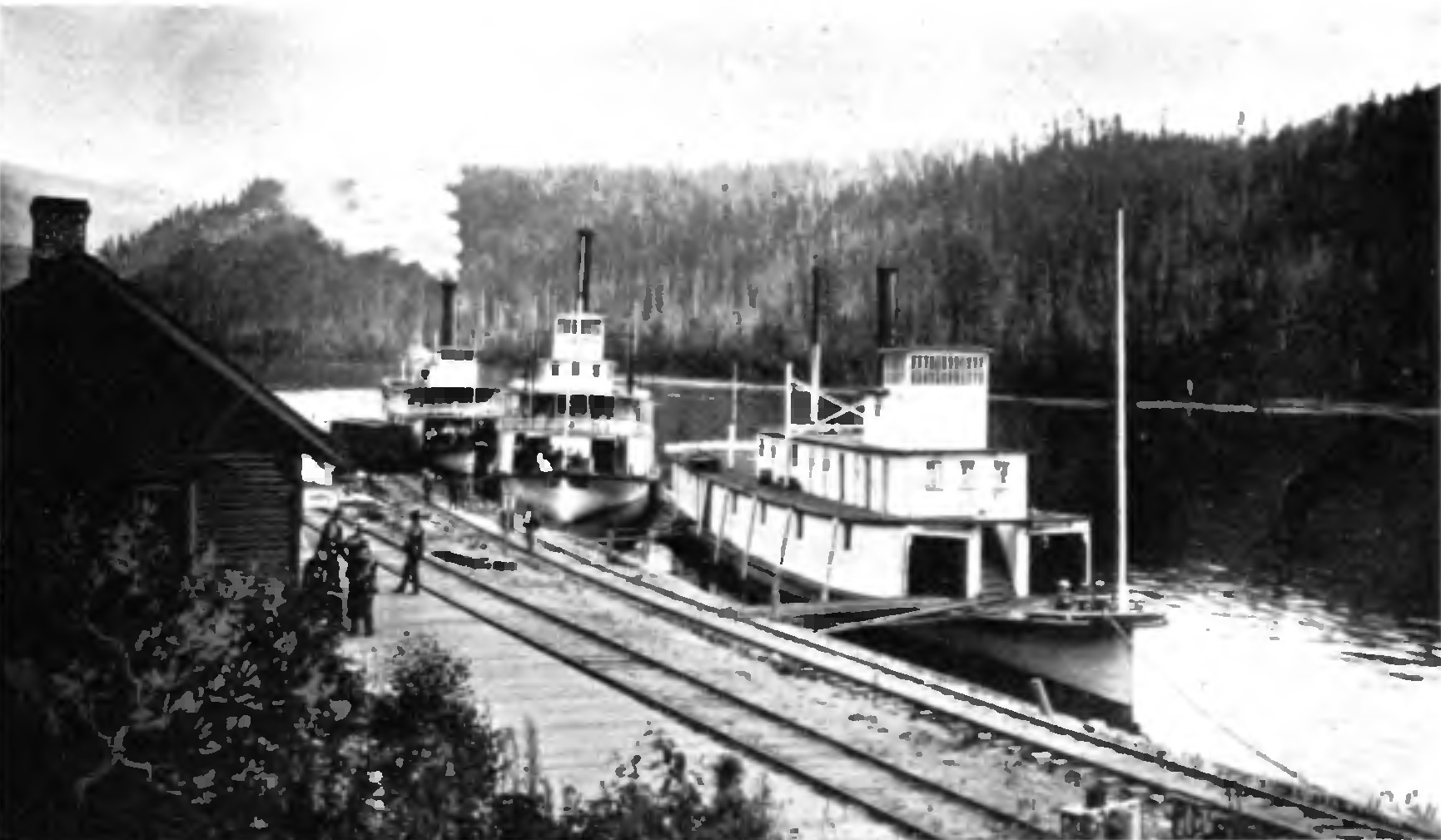
- Sternwheelers Lytton (in distance), Columbia (center vessel with high pilot house), and Kootenai (on right) at Robson, BC, sometime between 1890 and 1894

History

Canada
- Name: Columbia
- Owner: Columbia and Kootenay Steam Navigation Company
- Route: Arrow Lakes
- Builder: Joseph Paquet or Alexander Watson
- Cost: $75,000
- Launched: 1891, at Northport, Washington, also known as Little Dalles, Washington
- Maiden voyage: August 20, 1891
- In service: 1891
- Out of service: 1894
- Identification: CAN 126880
- Fate: Destroyed by fire

General characteristics
- Type: inland shallow-draft boat passenger/freighter
- Tonnage: 534 gross; 378 net
- Length: 152.6 ft (46.5 m)
- Beam: 28 ft (8.5 m)
- Depth: 6.3 ft (1.9 m) depth of hold
- Installed power: steam engines manufactured by Harlan & Hollingsworth of Wilmington, Delaware, twin single-cylinder, horizontally mounted, 17" bore by 72" stroke, 19 hp (14 kW) nominal
- Propulsion: sternwheel

Columbia was a steam-powered sternwheeler that ran on the Arrow Lakes in British Columbia from 1891 to 1894. Columbia should be distinguished from the many other vessels with the same or similar names, including in particular the propeller-driven steamboat Columbia that also ran on the Arrow Lakes for many years.

== The Arrow Lakes route ==
Columbia was the fourth largest sternwheeler to run on the 130-mile (210 km) long Arrow Lakes and adjacent stretches of the Columbia River.

Before the construction of the Keenleyside Dam in the 1960s, there were two Arrow Lakes, called the upper and lower, which were separated by a stretch of shallow water known as the "Narrows." The lakes are part of the Columbia River, which flows into upper Arrow Lake at Arrowhead, British Columbia, and begins again at the southern end of the lower lake near the towns of Robson and Castlegar. Steamers running on Arrow Lakes typically started from the railheads. In the early 1890s, the northern railhead was Revelstoke about 25 miles (40 km) up the Columbia River from Arrowhead, where the transcontinental line of the Canadian Pacific Railway crossed the Columbia. In the south, the Great Northern Railway had reached Little Dalles, Washington by the 1890s. Rail construction was ongoing however. The Canadian Pacific Railway was building an extension south from Revelstoke along the east side of the Columbia River, which would eventually reach Arrowhead. By 1894, the extension had only gone as far as the town of Wigwam, about halfway between Revelstoke and Arrowhead, which became the northernmost point on the route for Columbia.

== Design and construction ==
Columbia was built in the United States at Little Dalles, now known as Northport, for the Columbia and Kootenay Steam Navigation Company. The vessel's hull had been built at Portland, Oregon then disassembled into sections and shipped by rail to Northport for reassembly and launch. On the Arrow Lakes, Columbia was the fifth and largest sternwheeler ever built at that time.

== Operations on Arrow Lakes ==
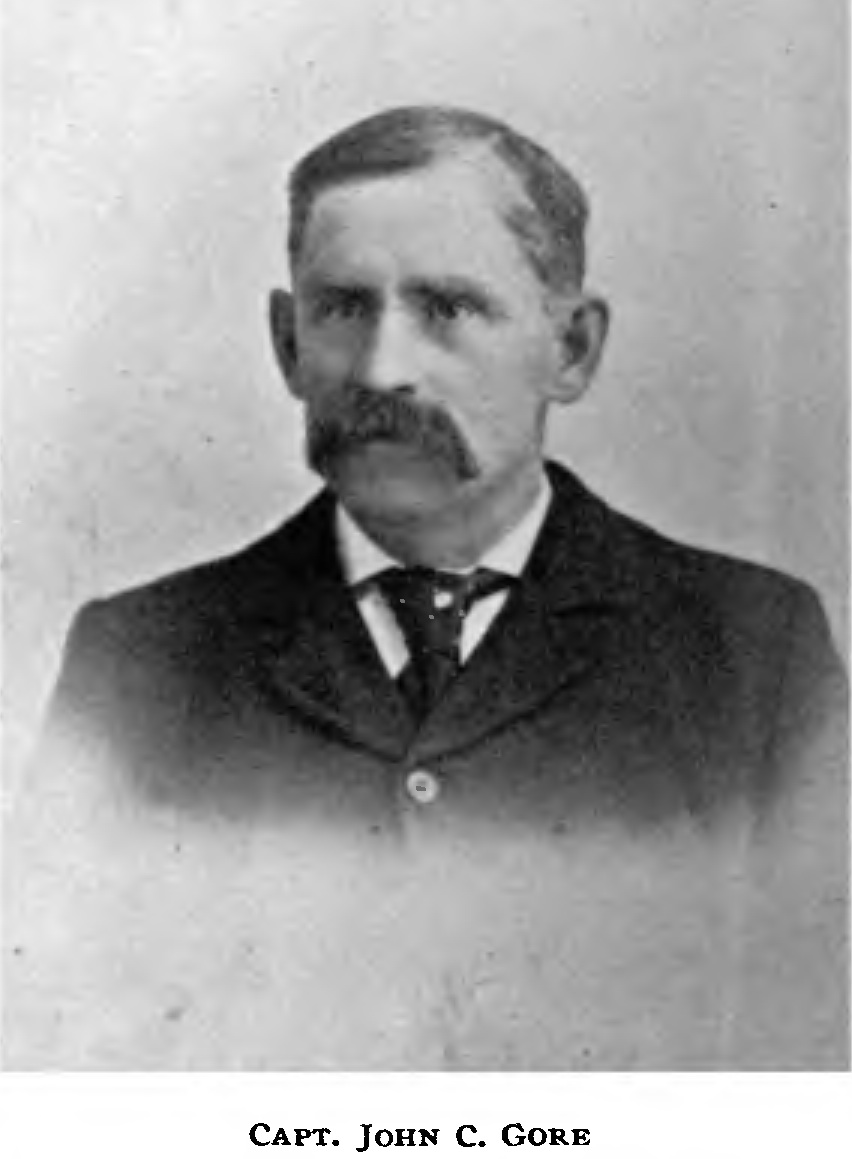
John C. Gore, captain of Columbia

Under Captain John C. Gore, she made her first trip north from Little Dalles to Robson, British Columbia, on August 20, 1891, leaving at 1:00 p.m. and arriving at Robson between 7:00 and 8:00 p.m. She left for Revelstoke on August 22, 1891. The addition of Columbia to the C.K.S.N.'s fleet allowed the company to maintain twice weekly trips from Revelstoke to Little Dalles, with the help of sidewheeler Lytton.

On one trip north, Columbia's hogchains (the steel cables that keep the lightly built hull of an inland steamboat in shape) parted, causing the ship to become hogged, that is the hull sagged at the bow and the stern. This would have made the vessel unsafe to use until the hog chains could be repaired and the hull returned to proper shape.

== Construction completed ==
Navigation on the Arrow Lakes and other parts of the Columbia River system was restricted by ice, low water and other winter conditions, affecting a ship's winter operations. In order to make a profit before winter, Columbia had entered operations in the summer of 1891, before she was fully complete.

During the post-season lay up at Revelstoke in the fall of 1891, Alexander Watson completed Columbia's construction. He built a new upper row of cabins, called a "Texas" deck and placed the pilot house on top. Electric lighting was also installed. These changes made the Columbia the premier vessel operating on the Upper Columbia. Columbia can be readily distinguished in photographs of the period by her high pilot house.

== Loss by fire ==
On August 2, 1894 Columbia caught fire at a wood yard just north of the international border, at a point about six miles (10 km) south of Trail, British Columbia. It was believed that the fire was caused by a crewman falling asleep without extinguishing his pipe. No one was hurt, but Columbia was destroyed. Insurance paid for $15,000 in damages but the economic cost to the company was still severe, losing a full working vessel during the height of mining and rail construction in the area.

== Salvage and replacement ==
In a typical pattern of salvage, Columbia's engines were retrieved from the wreck and installed in the Kootenay Lake steamer Kokanee. On the Arrow Lakes, the Columbia and Kootenay Steam Navigation Company replaced Columbia with the Nakusp.
