= List of tributaries of the Columbia River =

Tributaries and sub-tributaries are hierarchically listed in order from the mouth of the Columbia River upstream. Major dams and reservoir lakes are also noted.

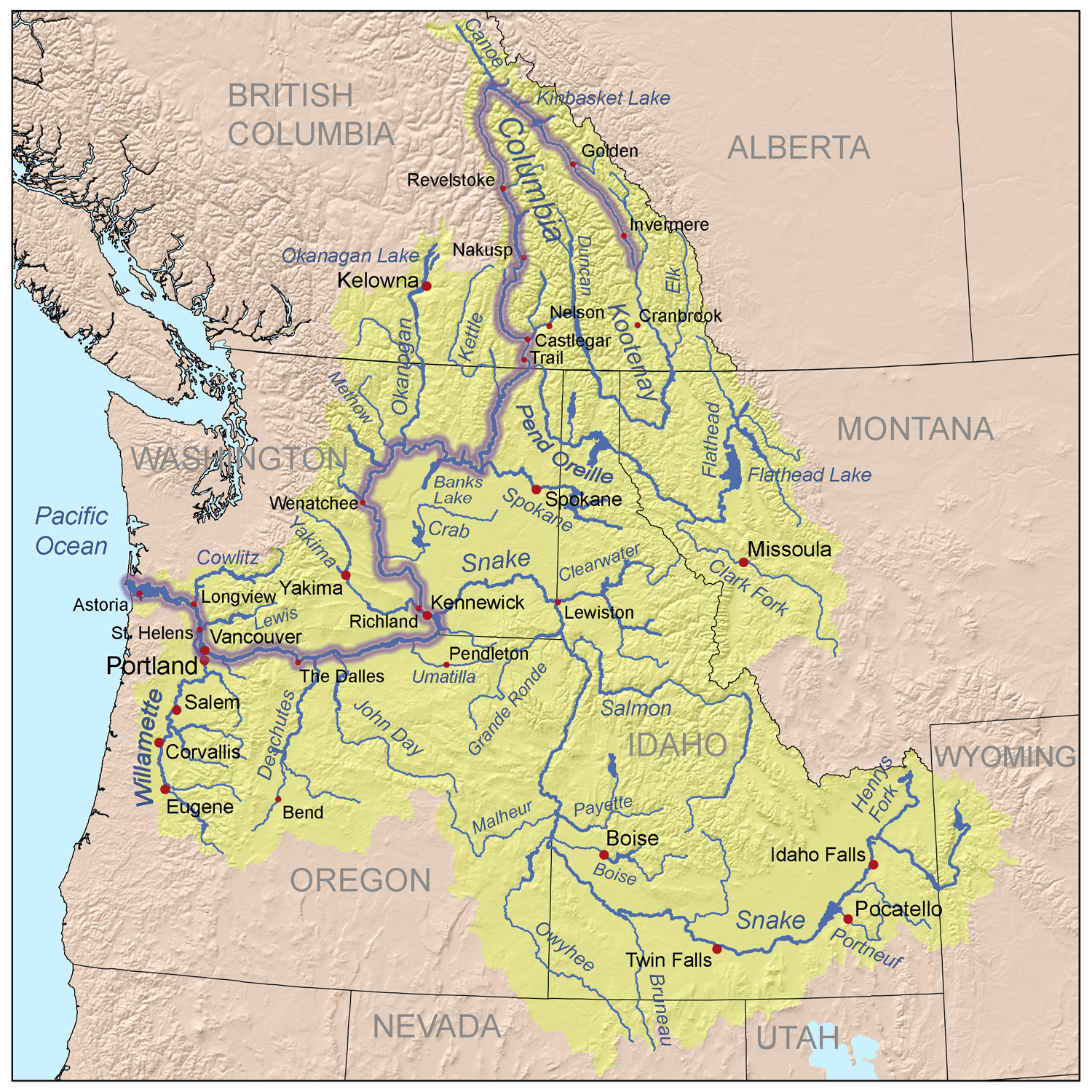
Map of the Columbia drainage Basin with the Columbia River highlighted and showing the major tributaries

List of major tributaries

The main river and tributaries are (sorted in order from the mouth heading upstream):

Left tributary	Right tributary	Length (km)	Basin size (km^{2})	Average discharge (m^{3}/s)
Lower Columbia Mouth to Bonneville Dam
Youngs		43	257.6	14.7
	Grays	48	320	15.9
	Elochoman	24	490	10.8
Clatskanie		40	269.2	10.6
	Cowlitz	169	6,698	286.6
	Kalama	72	530	34.5
	Lewis	153	2,709	173.4
	Lake	18	260	
Willamette		301	28,949	1,098.7
	Washougal	53	550	24.7
Sandy		92	1,316	65
Middle Columbia Bonneville Dam to McNary Dam
	Wind	48	580	34.2
	Little White Salmon	31	350	
	White Salmon	71.3	1,000	30.4
Hood		40	720	27.6
	Klickitat	154.3	3,496	44.5
Fifteenmile Creek		87	970	5.6
Deschutes		406	27,549.6	215.7
John Day		457	20,521.3	80.4
Willow Creek		127	2,300	0.9
Umatilla		143	6,345	14
Upper Columbia McNary Dam to Columbia Lake
Walla Walla		98	4,553	34.3
Snake		1,735	260,938.7	1,755.6
	Yakima	344	15,930.4	100.3
Crab Creek		262	13,200	40.4
	Wenatchee	85	3,473.1	103.7
	Entiat	92	1,210	20.2
	Chelan	6.6	2,390	57.8
	Methow	129	4,727	44.4
	Okanogan	185	21,385.7	99
	Nespelem		580.8	2.5
	Sanpoil	95	2,540	11.4
Spokane		179	17,353.4	228.6
Colville		97	2,646.8	16.4
	Kettle	282	10,877	82.3
Pend Oreille		771	67,055.5	850.2
Kootenay		780	50,298	868
	Whatshan		581.4	12
	Mosquito Creek		435	10.2
Kuskanax Creek			350.9	10.6
Halfway			447.4	14.2
Incomappleux			1,020	55.8
Akolkolex			388.7	16.5
Illecillewaet		62	1,213.3	61.4
	Jordan		345.6	11.1
Downie Creek			655.8	27.9
Goldstream			954.4	39.5
Big Mouth Creek			591.2	22.9
	Canoe		712.6	15.2
	Wood		841.7	18.1
	Cummins		262.6	8.5
	Kinbasket		261.3	7.6
Windy			252.3	10.2
	Sullivan		632.5	18.9
	Bush		1,100.1	25.5
Gold			566.4	27.9
Beaver			1,163	54.3
	Bluewater		392.5	12.5
	Waitabit Creek		352.2	9.6
	Blaeberry	60	745.6	17.8
	Kicking Horse		1,815.4	40.9
Canyon Creek			161.7	4.9
Spillimacheen		118	1,456.2	38
Bugaboo Creek			368.4	7.3
Forster Creek			592.4	8.8
Horsethief Creek			630.5	10
Toby Creek			673.5	9
Dutch Creek			676.5	7.9

- Wallacut River (Washington)
- Chinook River (Washington)
- Alder Creek (Oregon)
  - Tansy Creek (Oregon)
- Skipanon River (Oregon)
- Youngs River (Oregon)
  - Lewis and Clark River (Oregon)
  - Wallooskee River (Oregon)
  - Klaskanine River (Oregon)
- Frank Born Creek (Washington)
- Sisson Creek (Washington)
- Deep River (Washington)
- Grays River (Washington)
- Crooked Creek (Washington)
- Harlow's Creek (Washington): Formerly "Jim Crow Creek"
- Elochoman River (Washington)
- John Day River (Oregon)
- Eskeline Creek (Oregon)
- Hillcrest Creek (Oregon)
- Big Creek (Oregon)
  - Little Creek (Oregon)
- Gnat Creek (Oregon)
- Kelly Creek (Oregon)
  - Spear Creek (Oregon)
- Hunt Creek (Oregon)
- Driscoll Slough (Oregon)
- Westport Slough (Oregon)
  - Plympton Creek (Oregon)
  - West Creek (Oregon)
  - Ross Creek (Oregon)
  - Olsen Creek (Oregon)
  - Eilertsen Creek (Oregon)
  - OK Creek (Oregon)
    - Favorite Creek (Oregon)
  - Tandy Creek (Oregon)
  - Graham Creek (Oregon)
- Clatskanie River (Oregon)
  - Fall Creek (Oregon)
  - Merril Creek (Oregon)
  - Perkins Creek (Oregon)
- Coal Creek Slough (Washington)
- Cougar Creek (Washington)
- Abe Creek (Washington)
- Mill Creek (Washington)
- Abernathy Creek (Washington)
- Germany Creek (Washington)
- Coal Creek Slough (Washington)
- Cowlitz River (Washington)
  - Coweeman River (Washington)
  - Toutle River (Washington)
  - Mayfield Dam and Lake Mayfield (Washington)
  - Tilton River (Washington)
  - Mossyrock Dam and Riffe Lake (Washington)
  - Cowlitz Falls Dam and Lake Scanewa (Washington)
  - Cispus River (Washington)
  - Muddy Fork (Washington)
  - Clear Fork (Washington)
    - Ohanapecosh River (Washington)
- Kalama River (Washington)
- Lewis River (Washington)
  - East Fork Lewis River (Washington)
  - Merwin Dam and Lake Merwin (Washington)
  - Yale Dam and Yale Lake (Washington)
  - Swift Dam and Swift Reservoir (Washington)
- Lake River (Washington)
  - Buckmire Slough (Washington)
  - Salmon Creek (Washington)
  - Whipple Creek (Washington)
  - Flume Creek (Washington)
  - Bachelor Island Slough (Washington)
- Willamette River (Oregon; see below for sub-tributaries)
- Washougal River (Washington)
- Sandy River (Oregon)
  - Bull Run River
    - Little Sandy River
  - Salmon River (Oregon)
  - Zigzag River (Oregon)
- Gibbons Creek (Washington)
- Crusher Creek (Oregon)
- Rainbow Creek (Oregon)
- Lawton Creek (Washington)
- Latourell Creek (Oregon)
- Young Creek (Oregon)
- Bridal Veil Creek (Oregon)
- Coopey Creek (Oregon)
- Dalton Creek (Oregon)
- Mist Creek (Oregon)
- Wahkeena Creek (Oregon)
- Multnomah Creek (Oregon)
  - Shady Creek
  - Big John Creek
- Good Bear Creek (Washington)
- Archer Creek (Washington)
- Indian Mary Creek (Washington)
- Oneonta Creek (Oregon)
  - Bell Creek
- Horsetail Creek (Oregon)
- Duncan Creek (Washington)
- Tumalt Creek (Oregon)
- Woodard Creek (Washington)
- Hardy Creek (Washington)
- McCord Creek (Oregon)
- Hamilton Creek (Washington)
- Metasequoia Creek (Oregon)
- Moffett Creek (Oregon)
- Tanner Creek (Oregon)
- Bonneville Dam and Lake Bonneville (Washington, Oregon)
- Eagle Creek (Oregon)
  - Sorenson Creek
  - Tish Creek
  - Opal Creek (Oregon)
- Ruckel Creek (Oregon)
- Rudolph Creek (Oregon)
- Dry Creek (Oregon)
- Rock Creek (Washington)
- Kanaka Creek (Washington)
- Herman Creek (Oregon)
  - Little Herman Creek
  - Camp Creek
  - Casey Creek
  - Hazel Creek
  - Slide Creek
  - Mullinix Creek
  - Whisky Creek
- Nelson Creek (Washington)
- Carson Creek (Washington)
- Grays Creek (Oregon)
- Wind River (Washington)
- Gorton Creek (Oregon)
- Harphan Creek (Oregon)
- Summit Creek (Oregon)
- Collins Creek (Washington)
- Lindsey Creek (Oregon)
- Wonder Creek (Oregon)
- Warren Creek (Oregon)
- Cabin Creek (Oregon)
- Starvation Creek (Oregon)
- Dog Creek (Washington)
- Viento Creek (Oregon)
- Perham Creek (Oregon)
- Little White Salmon River (Washington)
- Phelps Creek (Oregon)
  - Flume Creek
- White Salmon River (Washington)
- Henderson Creek (Oregon)
- Hood River (Oregon)
- Dry Creek (Washington)
- Jewett Creek (Washington)
- Mosier Creek (Oregon)
- Catherine Creek (Washington)
- Major Creek (Washington)
- Rowena Creek (Oregon)
- Klickitat River (Washington)
- Gooseberry Creek (Oregon)
- Chenoweth Creek (Oregon)
- Mill Creek (Oregon)
- Fifteenmile Creek (Oregon)
  - Eightmile Creek
  - Ramsey Creek
- The Dalles Dam and Lake Celilo (Washington, Oregon)
- Deschutes River (Oregon)
  - White River (Oregon)
  - Warm Springs River (Oregon)
  - Round Butte Dam and Lake Billy Chinook (Oregon)
  - Crooked River (Oregon)
    - Arthur R. Bowman Dam and Prineville Reservoir (Oregon)
  - Metolius River (Oregon)
  - Whychus Creek (Oregon)
  - Tumalo Creek (Oregon)
  - Spring River (Oregon)
  - Little Deschutes River (Oregon)
  - Fall River (Oregon)
  - Cultus River (Oregon)
  - Snow Creek (Oregon)
- John Day Dam and Lake Umatilla (Washington, Oregon)
- John Day River (Oregon)
- Willow Creek (Oregon)
  - Rhea Creek
  - Hinton Creek
- Umatilla River (Oregon)
- McNary Dam and Lake Wallula (Washington, Oregon)
- Walla Walla River (Washington, Oregon)
  - Touchet River (Washington)
- Snake River (Washington, Oregon, Idaho, Wyoming; see below for sub-tributaries)
- Yakima River (Washington; see below for sub-tributaries)
- Priest Rapids Dam (Washington) and Priest Rapids Lake (Washington)
- Crab Creek (Washington)
- Wanapum Dam (Washington) and Lake Wanapum (Washington)
- Rock Island Dam (Washington) and Rock Island Pool (Washington)
- Wenatchee River (Washington)
  - Chiwawa River (Washington)
  - Lake Wenatchee
    - Little Wenatchee River
    - White River
      - Napeequa River
- Rocky Reach Dam and Lake Entiat (Washington)
- Entiat River (Washington)
  - Mad River (Washington)
- Chelan River (and Lake Chelan) (Washington)
  - Stehekin River (Washington)
- Wells Dam and Lake Pateros (Washington)
- Methow River (Washington)
  - Twisp River (Washington)
- Okanogan River (Washington, British Columbia)
  - Similkameen River (British Columbia, Washington)
    - Tulameen River (British Columbia)
    - Pasayten River (British Columbia, Washington)
  - Okanagan Lake (British Columbia)
- Chief Joseph Dam and Rufus Woods Lake (Washington)
- Nespelem River (Washington)
- Grand Coulee Dam and Franklin D. Roosevelt Lake (Washington)
- Sanpoil River (Washington)
- Spokane River (Washington, Idaho)
  - Spokane Falls (Washington)
  - Little Spokane River (Washington)
  - Latah Creek (Washington and Idaho)
  - Lake Coeur d'Alene (Idaho)
    - Coeur d'Alene River (Idaho)
    - Saint Joe River (Idaho)
    - Saint Maries River (Idaho)
- Colville River (Washington)
- Martin Creek (Washington)
- South Fork Roper Creek (Washington)
- Sherman Creek (Washington)
- Nancy Creek (Washington)
- Katy Creek (Washington)
- Kettle River (Washington, British Columbia)
  - Granby River (British Columbia)
  - West Kettle River (British Columbia)
- Pend Oreille River (British Columbia, Washington, Idaho; see below for sub-tributaries)
- Kootenay River (British Columbia, Idaho, Montana; see below for sub-tributaries)
- Hugh Keenleyside Dam and Arrow Lakes (British Columbia)
- Whatshan River (British Columbia)
  - Whatshan Dam (British Columbia)
- Beaton Creek (British Columbia)
- Incomappleux River (British Columbia)
- Illecillewaet River (British Columbia)
- Revelstoke Dam and Revelstoke Lake (British Columbia)
- Goldstream River (British Columbia)
- Mica Dam and Kinbasket Lake (British Columbia)
- Canoe River (British Columbia)
- Wood River (British Columbia)
- Bush River (British Columbia)
  - Valenciennes River (British Columbia)
- Blaeberry River (British Columbia)
- Beaver River (British Columbia)
- Kicking Horse River (British Columbia)
  - Yoho River (British Columbia)
- Spillimacheen River (British Columbia)
- Templeton River
- Columbia Lake (British Columbia)

== Willamette River system ==
- Columbia Slough
- Multnomah Channel
  - Milton Creek
- Stephens Creek
- Johnson Creek
  - Crystal Springs Creek
- Kellogg Creek
- Tryon Creek
- Oswego Creek and Oswego Lake
- Clackamas River
  - Collawash River
- Tualatin River
  - Fanno Creek
- Molalla River
  - Pudding River
- Yamhill River
  - North Yamhill River
  - South Yamhill River
- Luckiamute River
- Santiam River
  - North Santiam River
  - Detroit Dam and Detroit Lake
    - Breitenbush River
  - South Santiam River
    - Middle Santiam River
- Calapooia River
- Marys River
- Long Tom River
- McKenzie River
  - Mohawk River
  - Cougar Dam and Cougar Reservoir
- Coast Fork Willamette River
  - Big River
- Middle Fork Willamette River
  - Lookout Point Dam and Lookout Point Lake
  - North Fork Middle Fork Willamette River

== Snake River system ==
- Ice Harbor Dam and Lake Sacajawea (Washington)
- Lower Monumental Dam and Lake Herbert G. West (Washington)
- Palouse River (Washington, Idaho)
- Tucannon River (Washington)
- Little Goose Dam and Lake Bryan (Washington)
- Lower Granite Dam (Washington)
- Clearwater River (Idaho)
  - Potlatch River (Idaho)
  - North Fork Clearwater River (Idaho)
  - Middle Fork Clearwater River (Idaho)
  - South Fork Clearwater River (Idaho)
- Grande Ronde River (Washington, Oregon)
  - Wallowa River (Oregon)
    - Lostine River (Oregon)
    - Minam River (Oregon)
- Salmon River (Idaho)
- Imnaha River (Oregon)
- Hells Canyon Dam (Idaho, Oregon)
- Oxbow Dam (Idaho, Oregon)
- Brownlee Dam (Idaho, Oregon)
- Powder River (Oregon)
- Weiser River (Idaho)
- Burnt River (Oregon)
- Payette River (Idaho)
- Malheur River (Oregon)
- Owyhee River (Oregon, Idaho, Nevada)
  - Owyhee Dam and Owyhee Reservoir (Oregon)
- Boise River (Idaho)
  - Lucky Peak Dam and Lucky Peak Lake (Idaho)
  - Arrowrock Dam and Arrowrock Reservoir (Idaho)
  - Anderson Ranch Dam and Anderson Ranch Reservoir (Idaho)
- Swan Falls Dam (Idaho)
- C. J. Strike Dam (Idaho)
- Bruneau River (Idaho)
- Bliss Dam (Idaho)
- Malad River (Idaho)
- Lower Salmon Dam (Idaho)
- Upper Salmon Dam (Idaho)
- Salmon Falls Creek (Idaho and Nevada)
- Shoshone Falls (Idaho)
- Milner Dam (Idaho)
- Minidoka Dam and Lake Walcott (Idaho)
- Raft River (Idaho, Utah)
- American Falls Dam (Idaho)
- Portneuf River (Idaho)
- Blackfoot River (Idaho)
- Gem State Dam (Idaho)
- Henrys Fork (Idaho)
  - Teton River (Idaho)
- Palisades Dam (Idaho)
- Salt River (Wyoming)
- Greys River (Wyoming)
- Gros Ventre River (Wyoming)
- Jackson Lake Dam and Jackson Lake (Wyoming)
- "Closed basin" rivers that drain to the Snake underground:
- Big Lost River (Idaho)
- Little Lost River (Idaho)

== Yakima River system ==
- Amon Creek (Washington)
- Naches River (Washington)
  - Tieton River (Washington)
    - Tieton Dam and Rimrock Lake (Washington)
  - Bumping River (Washington)
    - American River (Washington)
- Wenas Creek (Washington)
- Selah Creek (Washington)
- Teanaway River (Washington)
- Cle Elum River (Washington)
- Kachess River (Washington)
  - Kachess Lake (Washington)
- Keechelus Lake (Washington)

== Pend Oreille River system ==
- Waneta Dam (British Columbia)
- Seven Mile Dam (British Columbia)
- Salmo River (British Columbia)
- Boundary Dam (Washington)
- Box Canyon Dam (Washington) (Washington)
- Albeni Falls Dam (Idaho)
- Priest River (Idaho)
- Lake Pend Oreille (Idaho)
  - Pack River (Idaho)
  - Clark Fork (Idaho, Montana)
    - Cabinet Gorge Dam (Idaho)
    - Noxon Rapids Dam (Montana)
    - Thompson River (Montana)
      - Little Thompson River (Montana)
    - Vermilion River (Montana)
    - Flathead River (Montana, British Columbia)
      - Jocko River (Montana)
      - SKQ Dam (Montana)
      - Flathead Lake (Montana)
      - Swan River (Montana)
      - Whitefish River (Montana)
        - Stillwater River (Montana)
      - South Fork Flathead River (Montana)
        - Hungry Horse Dam (Montana)
      - North Fork Flathead River (Montana, British Columbia)
    - Bitterroot River (Montana)
    - Blackfoot River (Montana)
    - Little Blackfoot River (Montana)

== Kootenay River system ==
- Brilliant Dam (British Columbia)
- Slocan River (British Columbia)
  - Little Slocan River
  - Slocan Lake
- Corra Linn Dam (British Columbia)
- Kootenay Lake (British Columbia)
- Duncan River (British Columbia)
  - Duncan Dam (British Columbia)
- Goat River (British Columbia)
- Moyie River (Idaho, British Columbia)
- Yaak River (Montana, Yahk River in British Columbia)
- Fisher River (Montana)
- Libby Dam (Montana) and Lake Koocanusa (Montana, British Columbia)
- Elk River (British Columbia)
  - Wigwam River (British Columbia, Montana)
  - Coal Creek (British Columbia)
  - Fording River (British Columbia)
- Bull River (British Columbia)
- Wild Horse River (British Columbia)
- St. Mary River (British Columbia)
- Lussier River (British Columbia)
- Palliser River (British Columbia)
- Cross River (British Columbia)
- Vermilion River (British Columbia)

== See also ==
- List of rivers of British Columbia
- List of rivers of Idaho
- List of rivers of Montana
- List of rivers of Oregon
- List of rivers of Washington (state)
- List of rivers of the Americas
