= Rossland (sternwheeler) =

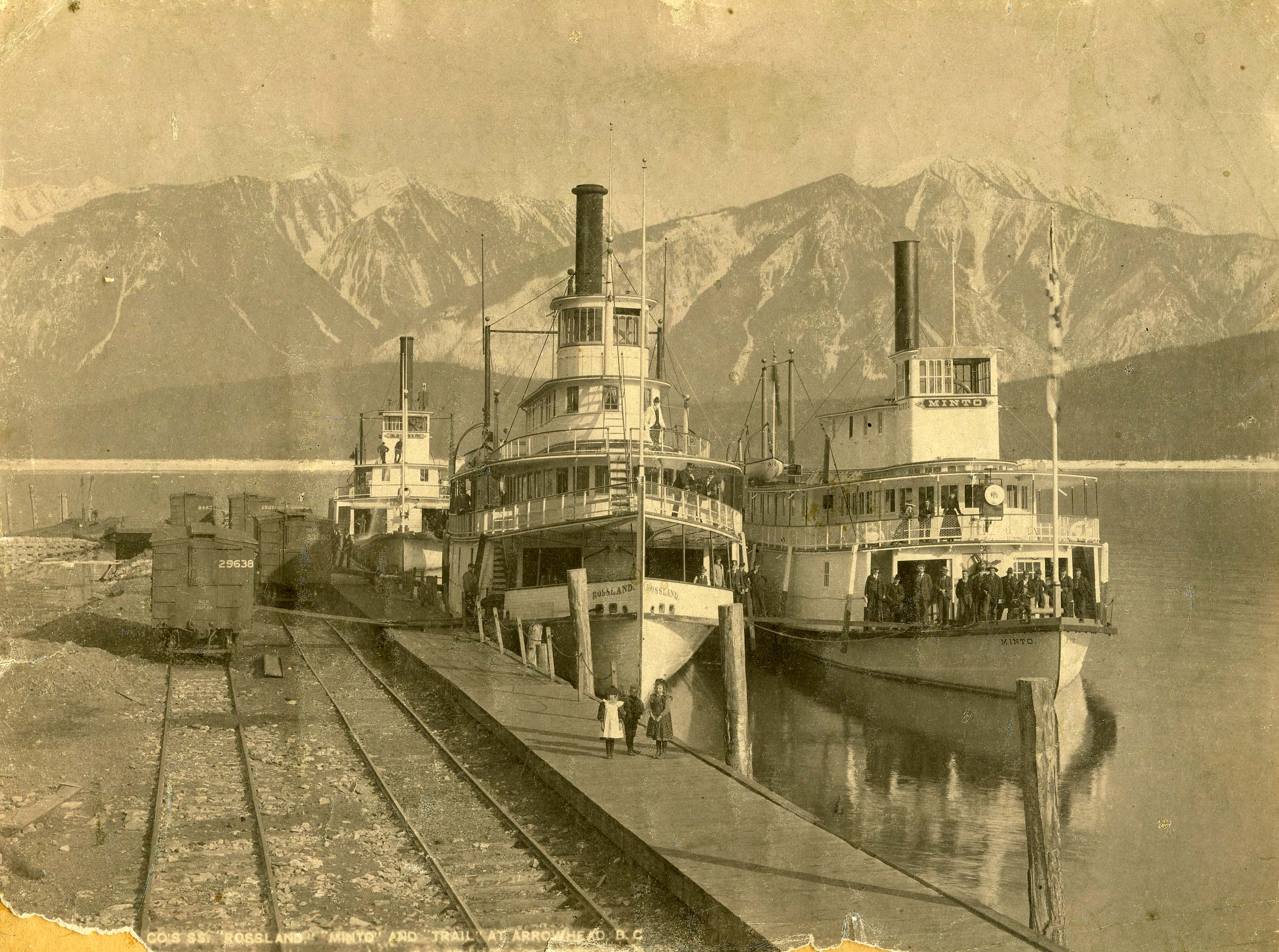
- Rossland (in center), with Trail on left and Minto on right, between 1898 and 1900

History

Canada
- Name: Rossland
- Owner: Canadian Pacific Railway
- Route: Arrow Lakes
- Builder: Thomas J. Bulger
- Cost: $86,000
- Launched: November 18, 1897, at Nakusp, British Columbia
- In service: 1898
- Out of service: 1916
- Identification: CAN 107142
- Fate: Sunk at dock while out of service, January 25, 1917

General characteristics
- Type: Inland lake boat, express passenger/tourism/general purpose
- Tonnage: 884 GRT; 531.5 NRT
- Length: 183.5 ft (55.9 m)
- Beam: 29.1 ft (8.9 m)
- Depth: 7.0 ft (2.1 m) depth of hold
- Installed power: Coal-fired boiler, steam engines, twin horizontally mounted, 22 in (560 mm) bore by 96 in (2,400 mm) stroke, 32.2 nhp
- Propulsion: sternwheel
- Speed: 22 mph (35 km/h) (maximum)
- Capacity: 300 passengers

Rossland was a sternwheel steamboat that ran on the Arrow Lakes in British Columbia. The vessel was named after Rossland, British Columbia, once a prosperous mining town in the region.

== Design and construction ==
Rossland was the third steamboat built by the Canadian Pacific Railway (CPR) for its steamboat lines running in the lakes of the Kootenays. She was designed by the superintendent of the CPR's Lake Service, the accomplished steamboat man James W. Troup, to be an express passenger and tourism boat, intended to make the 256-mile (412 km) round trip from Arrowhead to Robson and back in one day.

Rossland was built at Nakusp at the shipyard owned by the master builder Thomas J. Bulger and his sons James M. and David T. Bulger. Most inland steamers of the Pacific Northwest were built with a flat bottom with as shallow a draft as possible so that they could move as far up the many shallow rivers to reach gold fields, farms or other areas where transportation was needed and roads or railroads were absent or inadequate. Rossland was an exception to this rule. She was intended to operate as a "lake boat" where depth of water was normally not a problem, and therefore she had a rounder and deeper bottom than the normal sternwheeler design. Her lake boat design would make Rossland faster and more efficient on the deep water of the Arrow Lakes. Her powerful engines were built by B.C. Iron Works, in Vancouver

== Service on Arrow Lakes ==
Following her launch, Rossland was towed to a nearby wharf by the vessel Nakusp for completion. Before passenger accommodations were installed, Rossland was worked towing barges while Lytton was being overhauled. Passenger service for Rossland began in early 1898. At her maximum speed, 22 miles per hour (35 km/h), Rossland was easily the fastest vessel on the lakes. However, she burned too much coal at this pace, and normally did not run so fast. Steamboats were prone to damage and even destruction by fire, as Nakusp had been in 1897. In 1899 Rossland caught fire below the town of Nakusp. Captain Forslund was able to beach the vessel and extinguish the flames. Steamboat operation on the Arrow Lakes was seasonal, as they were generally frozen over during winter. The boats were moored in as safe a place as could be found during the freeze up, and sometimes work would be done on them to prepare them for the next season. Often work would be done on the boats to prepare them for the next season, and this occurred in Rossland's case.

== Reconstruction ==
During the winter of 1908 to 1909, at a cost of $2,290, her texas deck (the highest cabin on the ship except for the pilot house) was extended all the way back to the stern to allow additional passenger accommodations. Rossland's hull, built entirely of wood, wore out quickly under heavy use, and became waterlogged. This was typical for wooden steamboats. If repair of the hull was impractical, sometimes a new hull would be built and the boat's cabins (called the "house") and machinery would be transferred to the new hull. In the winter of 1909–1910, this was done with the Rossland. She was brought into the shipyard at Nakusp, where builder James Bulger hauled her out of the water, unfastened her house and machinery, and jacked them up on timbers. Bulger and his workmen then launched the old hull back onto the lake and built a new hull under the old house and machinery. The supports were removed, and the vessel was relaunched. With a new hull, Rossland was practically a new steamboat. The Texas was also extended a bit during the 1909–10 reconstruction.

== Effects of the Great War ==
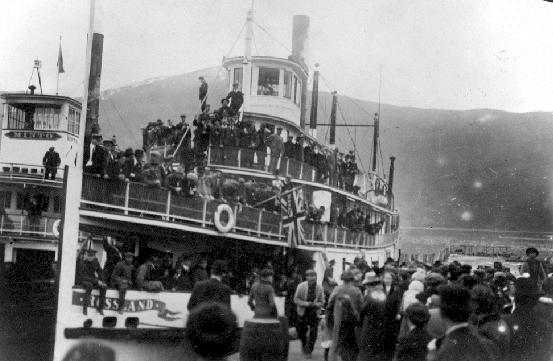
Rossland embarking troops, c. 1915, with Minto alongside

When Canada entered the Great War in 1914, the young men of British Columbia were mobilized and many CPR employees volunteered for Canada's armed services. Engineers, deck and engine room hands were especially wanted by the Royal Canadian Navy. As the young men left, the local farms and businesses declined, and there was a fall-off in tourism as well. In her last years, Rossland like other CPR inland steamers, transported troops. The economic downturn caused by mobilization forced CPR to take a number of its steamers out of operation. Rossland had been having boiler troubles, and rather than repairing them, CPR took her out of service.

== Foundered at dock ==
On January 25, 1917, Rossland, moored at Nakusp, sank at the dock. Either her hull seams had opened or the weight of ice and snow on her decks and house had pressed her down so far that water poured in through ports that had been left open. She sank quickly, heeled over sharply on her port side, with the water up to the pilot house. Rossland was raised in March 1917. Her long-time master, Captain Forslund, bought her hull and used it as a wharf boat for his place south of Needles.

== See also ==
- List of historical ships in British Columbia
