= Nakusp (sternwheeler) =

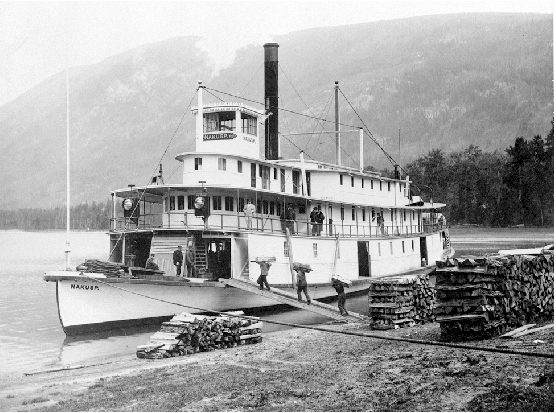
- Nakusp

History

Canada
- Owner: Columbia and Kootenay Steam Navigation Company
- Builder: Thomas J. Bulger
- Launched: July 1, 1895
- Maiden voyage: late August 1895
- In service: 1895
- Out of service: 1897
- Identification: CAN 103302
- Fate: Destroyed by fire, December 23, 1897 at Arrowhead, BC

General characteristics
- Type: Inland shallow draft passenger/freighter
- Tonnage: 1083 gross; 832 registered
- Length: 171 ft (52 m)
- Beam: 33.5 ft (10 m)
- Depth: 6.3 ft (2 m) depth of hold
- Installed power: twin steam engines, single-cylinder, horizontally mounting, 20" bore by 72" stroke, 26.6 horsepower nominal, manufactured by Iowa Iron Works, Dubuque, Iowa
- Propulsion: sternwheeler
- Notes: near sistership to Kootenay

The Nakusp was a steam-powered sternwheeler that operated on the Arrow Lakes of British Columbia from 1895 to 1897.

== Design and construction ==
Nakusp was commissioned by the Columbia and Kootenay Steam Navigation Company to replace the sternwheeler Columbia which had burned in 1894. Capt. James W. Troup, the company's superintendent, designed Nakusp.

When launched on July 1, 1895, Nakusp was the largest steamboat that had been built on Arrow Lakes. There were two other sternwheelers operating on the Arrow Lakes when Nakusp was launched, Lytton and Kootenai. Nakusp could carry more freight than both of them combined. At 1083 gross tons, Nakusp was over twice as large as the Columbia she was replacing. Nakusp was also considered a luxury vessel for the time, as described by historian Downs:

She was the finest sternwheeler in the province, complete with hot and cold running water, steam heat and electric lights. Her dining room, richly decorated in white and gold, arched to a dome two decks high. Glittering chandeliers swung from the ornate ceiling while plants and flowers added additional splashes of color.

Nakusp had three decks, the main or freight deck, the saloon or passenger deck, and the Texas or hurricane deck. The freight deck could accommodate approximately 15 railroad car loads of freight, or about 300 tons. Mechanically the vessel had a steam-driven capstan and a dynamo to generate electricity for the 130 electric lights on board. Nakusp also had two searchlights and a boom light to allow night operations.

There were 17 staterooms on the saloon deck. The saloon deck also include a parlour, 18 ft (5 m) wide and 44 ft (13 m) long, a dining room 17 ft (5 m) by 38 ft (12 m), and a smoking room 17 ft (5 m) wide and 34 ft (10 m) long. There were additional cabins on the Texas deck. The inside of the Texas deck included an open balcony or gallery running around and above the dining room on the saloon deck. The dining room ceiling was 17 ft (5 m) high, and light came into the room through colored windows in the clerestory.

== Operations on Arrow Lakes ==
By the time Nakusp was placed in operations, the Canadian Pacific Railway had completed its transcontinental line, which crossed the Columbia River at Revelstoke, BC, about 28 miles up the Columbia River from Arrowhead, which was the main town at the northern end of upper Arrow Lakes. The stretch of the Columbia from Arrowhead to Revelstoke was difficult for steamboats to navigate, as the current was rapid and the water was often shallow. For this reason, C.P.R. built an extension southwards towards Arrowhead, but this was placed closed to the river, and was subject to washouts during high water on the Columbia.When rail line was washed out, the northernmost departure point for Nakusp and other steamers running on the lakes reverted to Revelstoke.

Most of the passenger traffic was generated by the mines in the Kootenay region, as a contemporary source reports:

The boat was crowded with passengers and it was amusing to see them, note book in hand, comparing experiences with each other. All seemed to have but one idea -- mining -- and the number of samples of rock that were produced from side pockets, valises, etc., and passed around for inspection was amazing. Prospectors in their rough garbs, miners, speculators and tourists, all hobnobbed together and the subject was confined to one theme -- mining. From the shore we were frequently hailed by the prospectors on the tramp and on several occasions the boat stopped and took one or more of these hardy pioneers aboard.

By March 1897, the Canadian Pacific Railway had repaired its extension south from the mainline at Revelstoke to Arrowhead, BC, at the northern end of the upper Arrow Lake. At 7:00 p.m. on Mondays, Wednesdays, and Fridays, Nakusp left Arrowhead, B.C. steaming south down the lakes to Nakusp and then to Robson at the southern end of lower Arrow Lake. Again, the correspondent of the British Columbia Mining Journal described making the connection with Nakusp on the rail extension down to Arrowhead:

About 5 p.m. after the arrival and departure of the express from the East we made a start for Arrowhead, which we reached in about two hours time. Here again we had another wait until a number of freight cars were shunted to allow the passenger coach to run alongside the steamer ... In due time, however, we reached the steamer Nakusp and the air of comfort which her well-lighted saloons presented was a pleasant change from the dingy railway carriage. The Nakusp is really a most comfortable boat and her staterooms and general appointments excellent. She was packed full of freight when we boarded her, amongst which was a large blower for the Nelson smelter, and everything being ready for a start no time was lost in getting on the trip down the river. The air was sharp and there was a good deal of floating ice which, however, did not seem to interfere with the speed of the boat, but inside, the saloons were warm and comfortable.

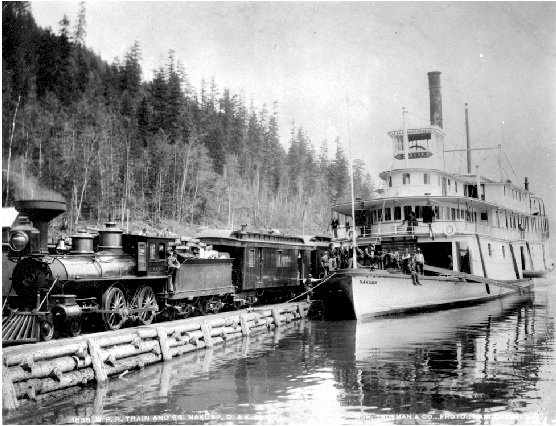
Nakusp meeting train of the Columbia and Kootenay Railway on the inclined wharf at Robson

Once at Robson, travelers could either ride the Columbia and Kootenay Railway up the Kootenay River to Nelson, BC and Kootenay Lake, or transfer to the smaller steamer Lytton to proceed further south down the Columbia River to Trail, BC and Northport, Washington. (During the 1896 season, Nakusp seems to have made the run all the way to Northport as the southern terminus of her route.) A rail line had reached Northport by this time, and traffic could proceed from there to Spokane or other points in the Pacific Northwest and the United States.

At 8:30 p.m. on Tuesdays, Thursdays, and Saturdays, Nakusp departed Robson for Nakusp and Arrowhead. Once at Arrowhead, a traveler could transfer to the Canadian Pacific Railway, ride up the extension to Revelstoke, then board trains bound either west or east on the C.P.R.'s transcontinental line. On each trip, Nakusp also stopped at way points on the Arrow Lakes. Nakusp was also used to push freight barges.

== Grounding on Kootenay bar ==
Before the area was flooded by rising water behind the Keenleyside Dam, the Kootenay River flowed into the Columbia river about 2 miles south of Robson. The Kootenay flowed very fast and had washed a lot of sand and sediment into the Columbia, forming a shallow area called the Kootenay Bar. On September 8, 1897, the strong current swung Nakusp out of control and on to the Kootenay Bar, where the vessel grounded. The passengers were disembarked and the mail was ferried ashore. The crew tried to refloat the steamboat, but these efforts failed. The sternwheeler Kootenay arrived on the scene and picked up the passengers and the mail and took them to Robson. Kootenay then returned to the Nakusp and tried to tow her off, but falling water in the river frustrated this also. Special equipment was sent down from Revelstoke, but it was not until November 1897 that vessel was refloated. The salvage cost $7,000.

== Loss by fire ==
On December 23, 1897, Nakusp caught fire while moored at the dock at Arrowhead. The fire spread quickly and the vessel was a total loss. No one was hurt, but four freight car loads of freight were already on board, and these were also destroyed. The cause of the fire was not determined. The sternwheeler Minto was built as a replacement for the Nakusp, although Minto was smaller and of somewhat different design, this was made up for by her sturdy steel-framed hull which allowed better operation in the winter months when ice would be on the lakes and rivers.
