= Beaton =

Beaton may refer to:

== Places ==
- Beaton, British Columbia, locality in Canada
- Beaton Creek, tributary of Columbia River, Canada

== People ==
=== Surname ===
- Beaton (surname), a surname with multiple origins, list of people with the name

=== Given name ===
- Beaton Abbott (1903–1992), Canadian educator and politician from Newfoundland
- Beaton Squires (1881–?), Newfoundland football player and lawyer
- Beaton Tulk (1944–2019), Canadian politician from Newfoundland

== See also ==
- Mrs Beeton
- Beeton (disambiguation)
