= Goldstream River (Columbia River tributary) =

Location
- Country: Canada
- Province: British Columbia
- District: Kootenay Land District

Physical characteristics
- Source: Selkirk Mountains
- Mouth: Columbia River
  - location: Lake Revelstoke
  - coordinates: 51°39′N 118°37′W
- Discharge
  - location: Above Palmer Creek
  - average: 18.3 m^{3}/s (650 cu ft/s)
  - minimum: 0.7 m^{3}/s (25 cu ft/s)
  - maximum: 122 m^{3}/s (4,300 cu ft/s)

The Goldstream River is a tributary of the Columbia River, joining that stream via the Lake Revelstoke reservoir after running largely west from the heart of the northern Selkirk Mountains. The river's name derives from the Big Bend Gold Rush of 1865, during which it was the scene of busy prospecting and mining activities and as one of the centres of the rush.

== See also ==
- Tributaries of the Columbia River
- List of rivers of British Columbia
