= Nespelem River =

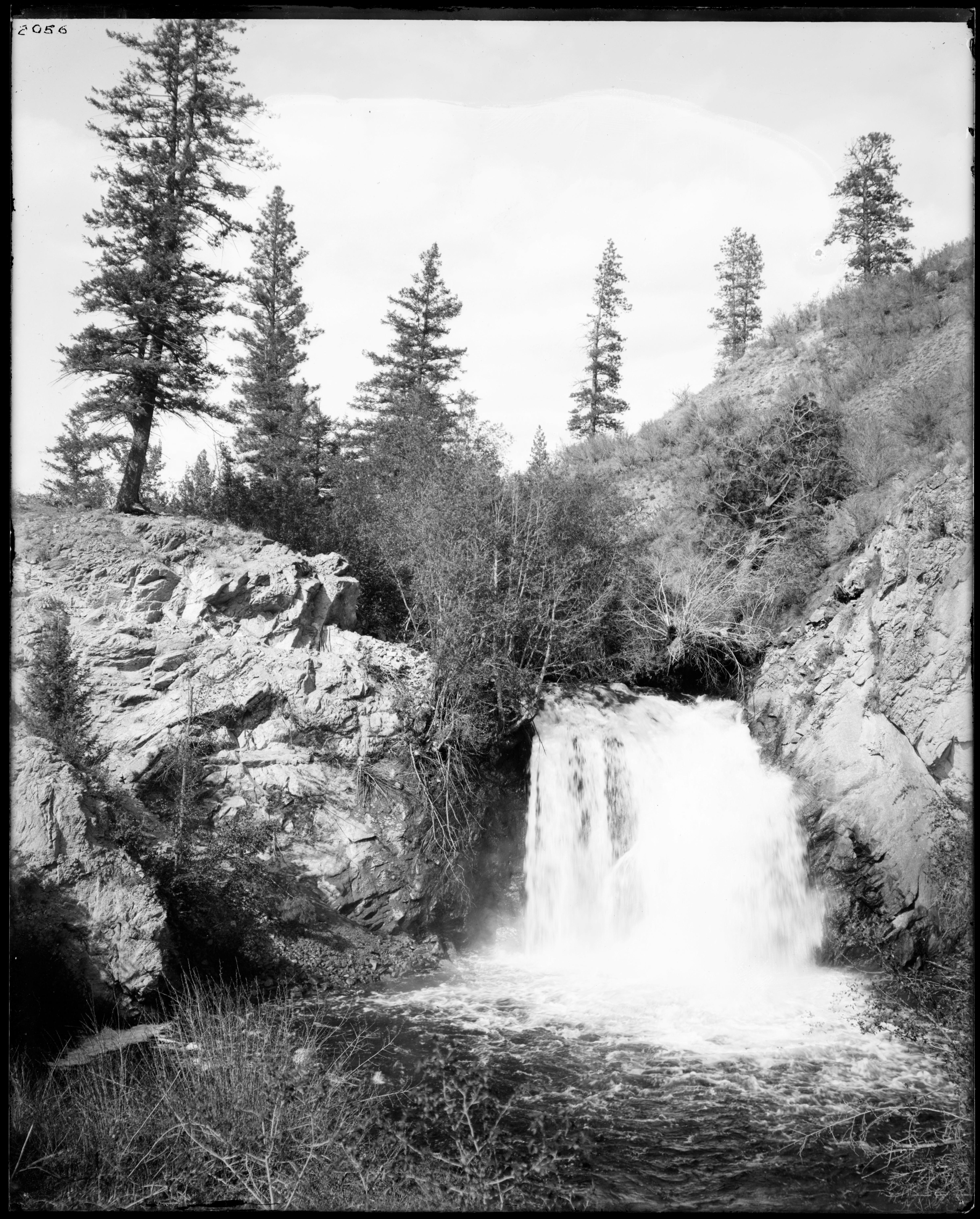

Location
- Country: United States
- State: Washington
- City: Nespelem

Physical characteristics
- Source
  - coordinates: 48°21′5″N 118°55′48″W
  - elevation: 3,850 ft (1,170 m)
- Mouth: Columbia River
  - coordinates: 48°7′40″N 119°2′34″W
  - elevation: 961 ft (293 m)
- Basin size: 224 mi^{2} (580 km^{2})

Basin features
- Tributaries
  - left: Little Nespelem River

The Nespelem River is a northern tributary of the Columbia River, in the U.S. state of Washington. It is completely contained within Okanogan County and the Colville Indian Reservation.

The name "Nespelem" is said to come from the Indian word nesilim, meaning "flat land".

== Course ==
The Nespelem River originates in eastern Okanogan County and flows south. It collects several minor tributaries including Stepstone Creek, North Star Creek, and Armstrong Creek, before passing by the town of Nespelem, Washington, the headquarters of the Colville Indian Reservation.

Below the town, the Nespelem River turns west. The Little Nespelem River joins just before the river empties into the Columbia River. This reach of the Columbia River is several miles below Grand Coulee Dam and many miles above Chief Joseph Dam. The impounded Columbia River behind Chief Joseph Dam, into which the Nespelem River flows, is called Rufus Woods Lake.

== See also ==
- List of rivers in Washington
- Tributaries of the Columbia River
