= Nespelem, Washington =

Nespelem
- Town
- Nespelem, Washington
- Location of Nespelem, Washington
- Coordinates: 48°10′09″N 118°58′20″W
- Country: United States
- State: Washington
- County: Okanogan

Government
  - Type: Mayor–council

Area
  - Total: 0.19 sq mi (0.50 km^{2})
  - Land: 0.19 sq mi (0.50 km^{2})
  - Water: 0 sq mi (0.00 km^{2})
- Elevation: 1,864 ft (568 m)

Population (2020)
  - Total: 180
  - Density: 930/sq mi (360/km^{2})
- Time zone: UTC-8 (Pacific (PST))
  - Summer (DST): UTC-7 (PDT)
- ZIP code: 99155
- Area code: 509
- FIPS code: 53-48540
- GNIS feature ID: 2413040

Nespelem is a town in Okanogan County, Washington, United States. The population was 180 at the 2020 census. The town is located on the Colville Indian Reservation. The name Nespelem is derived from a local Native American term meaning "large flat meadow".

== History ==
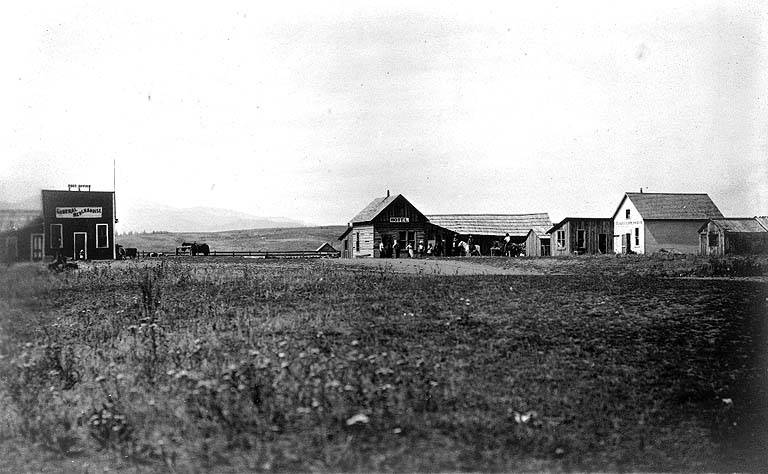
Nespelem in 1900

Nespelem was founded by the Yakama leader Chief Kamiakin and officially incorporated on April 15, 1935. It is the site of a historic Nez Perce cemetery, which was the original burial ground of Chief Joseph.

== Geography ==
Nespelem is located on the Nespelem River.

According to the United States Census Bureau, the town has a total area of 0.19 square miles (0.49 km^{2}), all of it land.

=== Climate ===
This climatic region is typified by large seasonal temperature differences, with warm to hot (and often humid) summers and cold (sometimes severely cold) winters. According to the Köppen Climate Classification system, Nespelem has a dry-summer humid continental climate, abbreviated "Dsb" on climate maps.

Climate data for Nespelem
Month	Jan	Feb	Mar	Apr	May	Jun	Jul	Aug	Sep	Oct	Nov	Dec	Year
Record high °F (°C)	60 (16)	66 (19)	79 (26)	93 (34)	97 (36)	101 (38)	107 (42)	110 (43)	102 (39)	88 (31)	70 (21)	58 (14)	110 (43)
Mean daily maximum °F (°C)	31 (−1)	39.2 (4.0)	50.8 (10.4)	61.9 (16.6)	70.9 (21.6)	78.7 (25.9)	87.3 (30.7)	86.2 (30.1)	76.5 (24.7)	62.7 (17.1)	44 (7)	34.5 (1.4)	60.3 (15.7)
Mean daily minimum °F (°C)	14.8 (−9.6)	19.9 (−6.7)	27.2 (−2.7)	33.2 (0.7)	39.6 (4.2)	45.9 (7.7)	50.3 (10.2)	49.3 (9.6)	41.5 (5.3)	33.5 (0.8)	26.1 (−3.3)	19.8 (−6.8)	33.4 (0.8)
Record low °F (°C)	−33 (−36)	−30 (−34)	−8 (−22)	−12 (−24)	17 (−8)	28 (−2)	30 (−1)	29 (−2)	17 (−8)	6 (−14)	−18 (−28)	−23 (−31)	−33 (−36)
Average precipitation inches (mm)	1.33 (34)	1.12 (28)	0.97 (25)	1.02 (26)	1.16 (29)	1.14 (29)	0.52 (13)	0.58 (15)	0.77 (20)	0.99 (25)	1.73 (44)	1.68 (43)	13.01 (330)
Average snowfall inches (cm)	8.6 (22)	4.8 (12)	1.4 (3.6)	0.2 (0.51)	0 (0)	0 (0)	0 (0)	0 (0)	0 (0)	0.2 (0.51)	3 (7.6)	9 (23)	27.3 (69)
Average precipitation days	9	7	6	6	7	6	3	3	5	6	9	9	76

== Demographics ==
Historical population
Census	Pop.	Note	%±
1940	300		—
1950	425		41.7%
1960	358		−15.8%
1970	323		−9.8%
1980	284		−12.1%
1990	187		−34.2%
2000	212		13.4%
2010	236		11.3%
2020	180		−23.7%
U.S. Decennial Census; 2020 Census

=== 2010 census ===
As of the 2010 census, there were 236 people, 75 households, and 53 families residing in the town. The population density was 1,242.1 inhabitants per square mile (479.6/km^{2}). There were 77 housing units at an average density of 405.3 per square mile (156.5/km^{2}). The racial makeup of the town was 10.6% White, 0.4% African American, 80.1% Native American, 0.4% Asian, 1.3% from other races, and 7.2% from two or more races. Hispanic or Latino of any race were 6.8% of the population.

There were 75 households, of which 42.7% had children under the age of 18 living with them, 24.0% were married couples living together, 29.3% had a female householder with no husband present, 17.3% had a male householder with no wife present, and 29.3% were non-families. 17.3% of all households were made up of individuals, and 6.7% had someone living alone who was 65 years of age or older. The average household size was 3.15 and the average family size was 3.55.

The median age in the town was 30 years. 29.2% of residents were under the age of 18; 15.7% were between the ages of 18 and 24; 24.6% were from 25 to 44; 21.6% were from 45 to 64; and 8.9% were 65 years of age or older. The gender makeup of the town was 52.5% male and 47.5% female.

=== 2000 census ===
As of the 2000 census, there were 212 people, 71 households, and 48 families residing in the town. The population density was 1,130.9 people per square mile (430.8/km^{2}). There were 84 housing units at an average density of 448.1 per square mile (170.7/km^{2}). The racial makeup of the town was 13.68% White, 82.08% Native American, 0.47% Asian, 0.47% Pacific Islander, 1.42% from other races, and 1.89% from two or more races. Hispanic or Latino of any race were 3.30% of the population.

There were 71 households, out of which 35.2% had children under the age of 18 living with them, 35.2% were married couples living together, 22.5% had a female householder with no husband present, and 31.0% were non-families. 23.9% of all households were made up of individuals, and 9.9% had someone living alone who was 65 years of age or older. The average household size was 2.99 and the average family size was 3.57.

In the town, the population was spread out, with 32.5% under the age of 18, 13.2% from 18 to 24, 17.5% from 25 to 44, 29.2% from 45 to 64, and 7.5% who were 65 years of age or older. The median age was 28 years. For every 100 females, there were 105.8 males. For every 100 females age 18 and over, there were 120.0 males.

The median income for a household in the town was $30,000, and the median income for a family was $27,500. Males had a median income of $43,250 versus $27,500 for females. The per capita income for the town was $12,836. About 15.9% of families and 16.9% of the population were below the poverty line, including 28.3% of those under the age of eighteen and 4.8% of those 65 or over.

== Education ==
The town is served by the Nespelem School District.
