= Beaton Creek =

Location
- Country: Canada
- Province: British Columbia
- District: Kootenay Land District

Physical characteristics
- Source: Selkirk Mountains
- Mouth: Columbia River
  - location: Upper Arrow Lake
  - coordinates: 50°44′N 117°44′W
- Discharge
  - location: Near Beaton
  - average: 2.74 m^{3}/s (97 cu ft/s)
  - minimum: 0.498 m^{3}/s (17.6 cu ft/s)
  - maximum: 24.4 m^{3}/s (860 cu ft/s)

Beaton Creek is a tributary of the Columbia River in the Canadian province of British Columbia.

== Course ==
Beaton Creek flows generally northwest into Beaton Arm and Upper Arrow Lake, part of the Columbia River.

== See also ==
- List of rivers of British Columbia
- Tributaries of the Columbia River
