= Whatshan Dam =

- Coordinates: 49.9164°N 118.1175°W
- Opening date: 1951
- Operator(s): BC Hydro (Operator)

Dam and spillways
- Impounds: Whatshan River
- Height: 12 metres (39 ft)

Reservoir
- Creates: Whatshan Lake

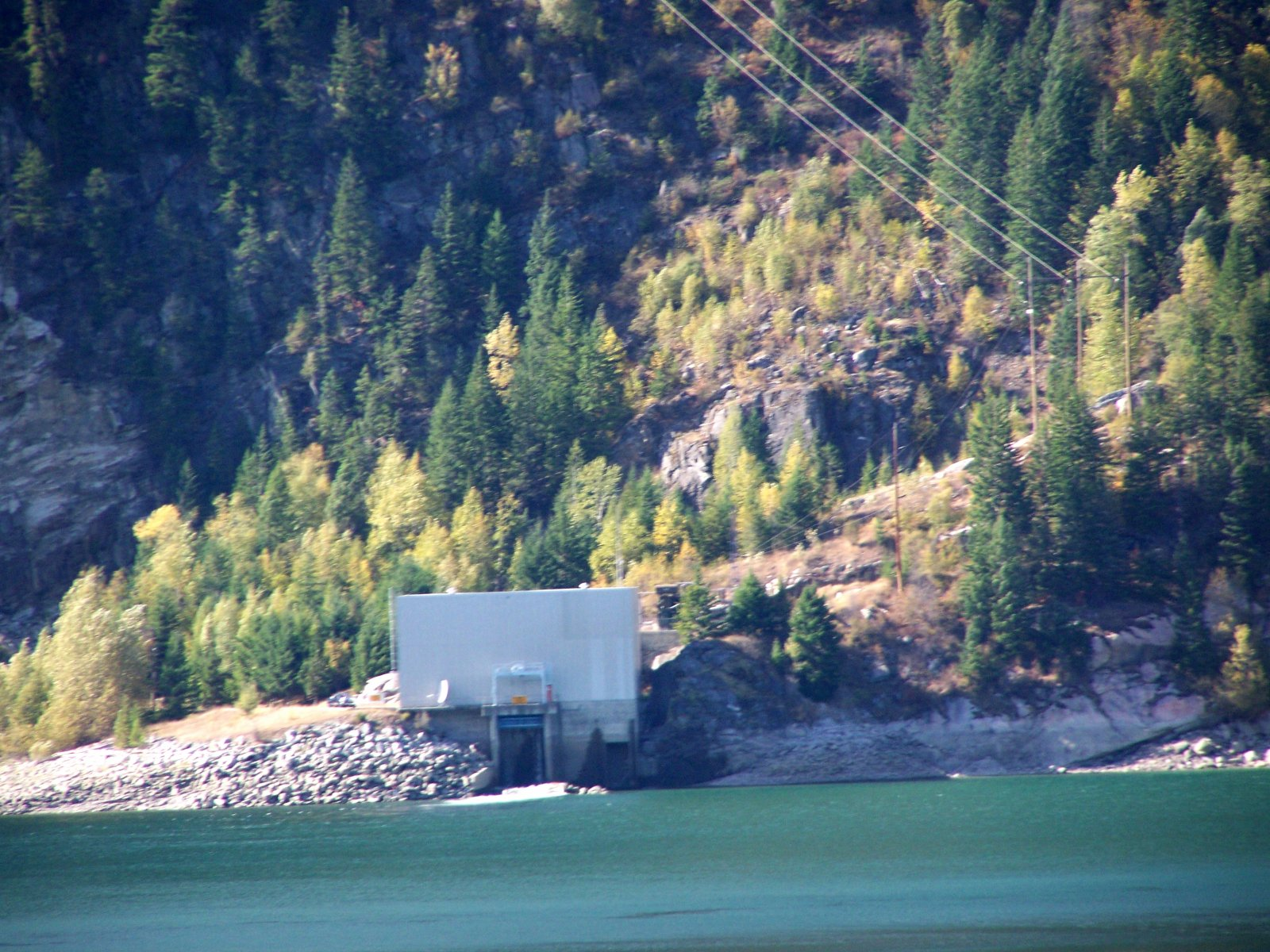
Whatshan Dam Powerhouse 49.910398°N 118.071750°W

Whatshan Dam was built by the B.C. Power Commission and completed in 1952. It is a concrete hydroelectric dam on the Whatshan River in the Canadian province of British Columbia. The Whatshan powerhouse has undergone three major transformations since 1951 when it was first built by the British Columbia Power Commission to provide electricity to the Okanagan and the Upper Arrow Lakes in 1951. In 1953 the powerhouse was destroyed after a rock and mud slide roared down the mountainside. The powerhouse was rebuilt soon after only to have to be rebuilt again a few metres higher to avoid being flooded after the completion of the Hugh Keenleyside Dam in 1968. The replacement 54MW powerhouse completed in 1972 is at the end of a 3.4 kilometre long tunnel and is located on the western side of Upper Arrow Lake in the Monashee Mountains. It is owned and operated by BC Hydro.

== See also ==
- List of generating stations in British Columbia
