= Elochoman River =

- Location of the mouth of the Elochoman River in Washington
- Etymology: Name of a Cathlamet village

Location
- Country: United States
- State: Washington
- County: Wahkiakum, Cowlitz, Pacific

Physical characteristics
- Source: Elochoman Lake
  - location: Willapa Hills, Cowlitz County, Washington
  - coordinates: 46°20′20″N 123°12′43″W
  - elevation: 1,654 ft (504 m)
- Mouth: Columbia River
  - location: Elochoman Slough, Wahkiakum County, Washington
  - coordinates: 46°13′35″N 123°24′2″W
  - elevation: 0 ft (0 m)
- Length: 15 mi (24 km)
- Basin size: 73 sq mi (190 km^{2})
- Discharge
  - location: For Mouth
  - average: 381 cuft/s

The Elochoman River is a tributary of the Columbia River, in the U.S. state of Washington. It is about 15 miles (24 km) long.

The river's name comes from the name of a Cathlamet (Chinookan) village.

== Course ==
The Elochoman River's headwater's start from Elochoman Lake, in Cowlitz County, from which it flows west for several miles. Joined by the tributary East Fork and North Fork, the main river turns south. After a few miles, the West Fork tributary joins. From there the main Elochoman River flows south and southwest. Its river valley widens into a broad flat bottomland called the Upper Elochoman Valley. Then the river passes through a short but narrow gorge, after which it meanders through the Lower Elochoman Valley.

In its final reach the Elochoman River flows through the sloughs and wetlands of the Columbia River's estuary. The mouth of the river is on Elochoman Slough, a 3-mile (4.8 km) long side-channel of the Columbia River located east of Hunting Islands, northwest of Cathlamet. Much of the lower Elochoman River, Elochoman Slough, and Hunting Island are part of the Columbian White-tailed Deer National Wildlife Refuge.

== Natural history ==
The Elochoman River supports populations of Chinook, Coho, and Chum salmon, as well winter-run steelhead trout. The steelhead, which routinely number over 1,000 annually, are a draw for sport fishing. The largest salmon (Chinook) ever caught in freshwater in Washington State was caught here by Mark Salmon on Oct 5, 1992, his catch weighed 68 lbs. and 4 ounces.

== See also ==
- List of rivers of Washington (state)
- Tributaries of the Columbia River
