= Beeton (disambiguation) =

Beeton is a town in Ontario, Canada.

Beeton may also refer to:

- Boyce Beeton (playing in 1960s), Australian rugby player
- Lucy Beeton (1829–1886), Australian Aboriginal schoolteacher and trader
- Mrs Beeton (1836–1865), Isabella Beeton, English cookery writer
- Sam Beeton (born 1988), British musician
- Samuel Orchart Beeton (1831–1877), British publisher and husband of Mrs Beeton

== See also ==
- Beaton (disambiguation), similar word
