= Whatshan River =

Coordinates: 49°52′N 118°7′W

The Whatshan River is a tributary of the Columbia River in the West Kootenay region of southeastern British Columbia. The river's drainage basin is approximately 390 square kilometres (150 sq mi) in area.

== Course ==
The Whatshan River flows generally south, passing through Whatshan Lake before joining the Columbia River in Lower Arrow Lake near the Needles Ferry.

== Name origin ==
In 1865, explorer James Turnbull noted in his diary that his party was camping at the mouth of the What-shaan River. Walter Moberly's 1866 map labelled the lake and river as Waatshaan. In 1884, Gilbert Malcolm Sproat referred to the Whatch-shan stream. The present spelling first appears in George Dawson's 1889 report. The actual indigenous term these explorers were attempting to transcribe, and consequently its meaning, is unclear. A lake, river, peak, and mountain range have received the name.

== See also ==
- List of rivers of British Columbia
- Tributaries of the Columbia River
