= Minto Sailing Dinghy =

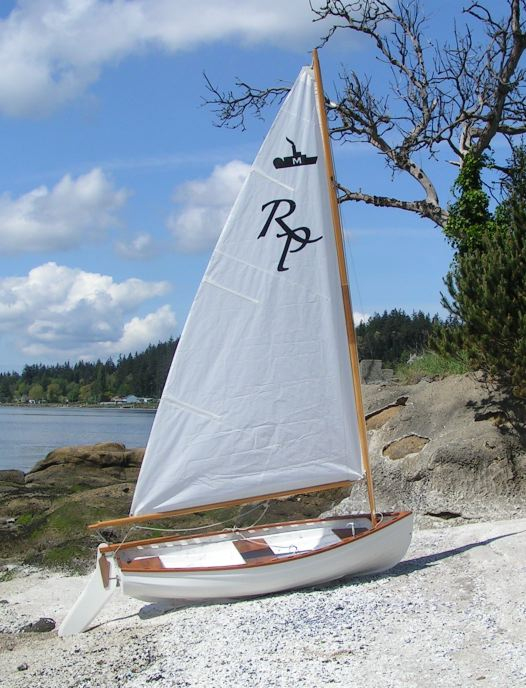
- A Minto Sailing Dinghy on the beach

Development
- Name: Minto Sailing Dinghy

Boat
- Crew: 2

Hull
- Type: Monohull
- Construction: Fibreglass
- Hull weight: 120 lb (54 kg)
- LOA: 9 ft (2.7 m)
- Beam: 51 in (1.3 m)

Rig
- Mast height: 5 ft 6 in (1.68 m)

Sails
- Total sail area: 54 sq ft (5.0 m^{2})

The Minto Sailing Dinghy is a sailing dinghy first produced commercially in the early 1960 and still in production.

== Initial version ==
The Minto Sailing Dinghy began its life as a skiff for a 24-foot sloop built by Hugh Rodd at Canoe Cove on Vancouver Island. The sloop was commissioned by a Vancouver Island printer who had made some money from an investment in the Minto Mine in British Columbia, and hence he named the sloop "Minto". After returning from World War II in 1946 Rob Wittlesey purchased the Minto and shortly thereafter traded the skiff, with "MINTO RVYC" carved into its transom, to Bob Schoen of Orcas Island for a smaller dinghy.

== First commercial fiberglass version ==
The Minto skiff eventually got stored in Bob's barn, where his friend Heine Dole, a NW marine architect, saw it and convinced Bob it would make a great dinghy reproduced in fiberglass. Heine took the skiff to Ed Hoppen, the Gig Harbor boat builder who was the original builder of the popular Thunderbird sailboats. After cutting out about two feet and reshaping the hull, Dole and Hoppen used the old Minto skiff as the plug for the first fiberglass Minto mold. Initially the objective was to only build five boats for themselves, Bob Schoen, and some friends. Hull number one was destroyed in trying to remove it from the mold, but hulls two through six did survive and are still in use today. As interest in the attractive little boats grew Hoppen was prompted by numerous requests to put the Minto into regular production. Ed Hoppen produced a couple hundred EDDON Boat Yard Mintos in the early 1960s, and then in the mid-1960s licensed Howard Smith, the owner of Ranger Boats in Kent, Washington, to add the Minto to his increasing line of small rowing and sailing craft. Until Ranger was sold in 1999, "Smitty" produced about 1000 Ranger Mintos, becoming one of the most popular and recognized yacht tenders in the NW.

Although the little steamship graphic displayed on the sails of the EDDON, Ranger and Rich Passage Boats Minto dinghies implies a direct link to the SS Minto steamship that operated on Arrow Lake in British Columbia for over 50 years, the association was created by Ed and Heine. They were looking for a way to make the new little fiberglass dinghy distinctive and they thought there was a similarity to the life boats used on the SS Minto and so chose the steamship graphic for the Minto.

== 2005 Revival ==
In 2005 Rich Passage Boats, LLC of Port Orchard WA put the Minto back into production as the Rich Passage Minto, using one of the two former Ranger Minto molds. The Three Tree Point Yacht Club of Des Moines, WA has been hosting the Minto Mingle for 29 years.
