= Arrowhead, British Columbia =

Arrowhead
- Location of Arrowhead in British Columbia
- Coordinates: 50°41′37″N 117°55′20″W
- Country: Canada
- Province: British Columbia

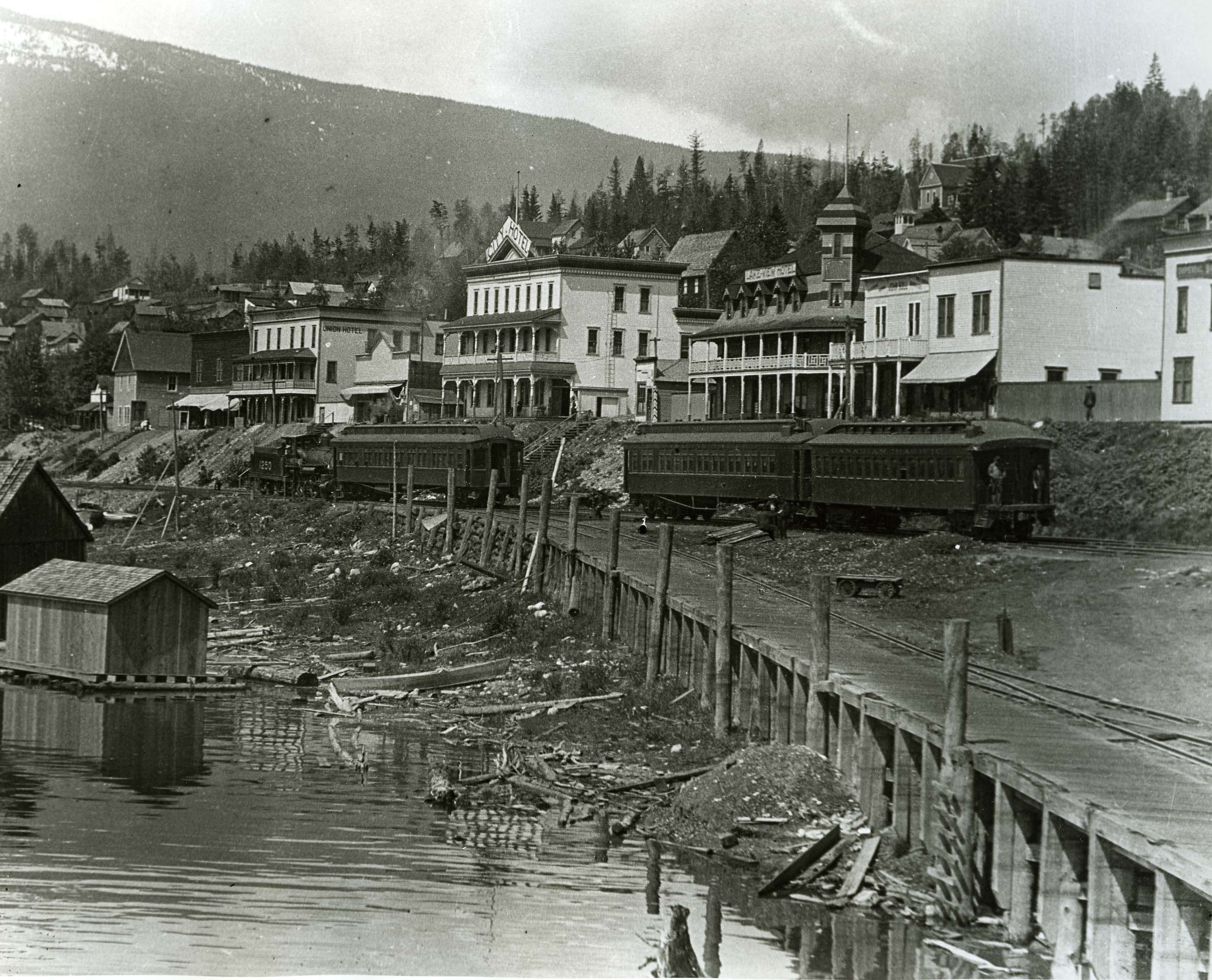
Arrowhead c. 1910

Arrowhead is a former steamboat port and town at the head of Upper Arrow Lake in British Columbia, Canada. A railway branch line connected Arrowhead with Revelstoke and destinations beyond until 1968, when Canadian Pacific Railway abandoned the site in preparation for the filling of Hugh Keenleyside Dam.

Apart from the cemetery, the initial site has been submerged beneath the waters of the lake, which is now part of the reservoir formed by the dam at Castlegar. However, the name still identifies the locality, and sometimes the local region.

== Name origin ==
Although the likely name origin is Arrowhead being at the head of the Arrow Lakes, another version indicates the finding of arrowheads in the ground during the construction of town buildings, evidencing an ancient battle between First Nations tribes. A further version identifies the arrowhead-shaped appearance of the lake from higher ground. The name of the Arrow Lakes is credited to "Arrow Rock", a large cliffside pictograph shot through with clusters of arrows, again relating to an ancient battle (in this case known to be between the Sinixt and the Ktunaxa), which stood above "the Narrows", a stretch of fast-flowing channel connecting Upper Arrow to Lower Arrow Lake.

== See also ==
- List of ghost towns in British Columbia
- Steamboats of the Arrow Lakes
- Comaplix, British Columbia
- Beaton, British Columbia
