= Arrow Lakes =

Lakes in British Columbia, Canada

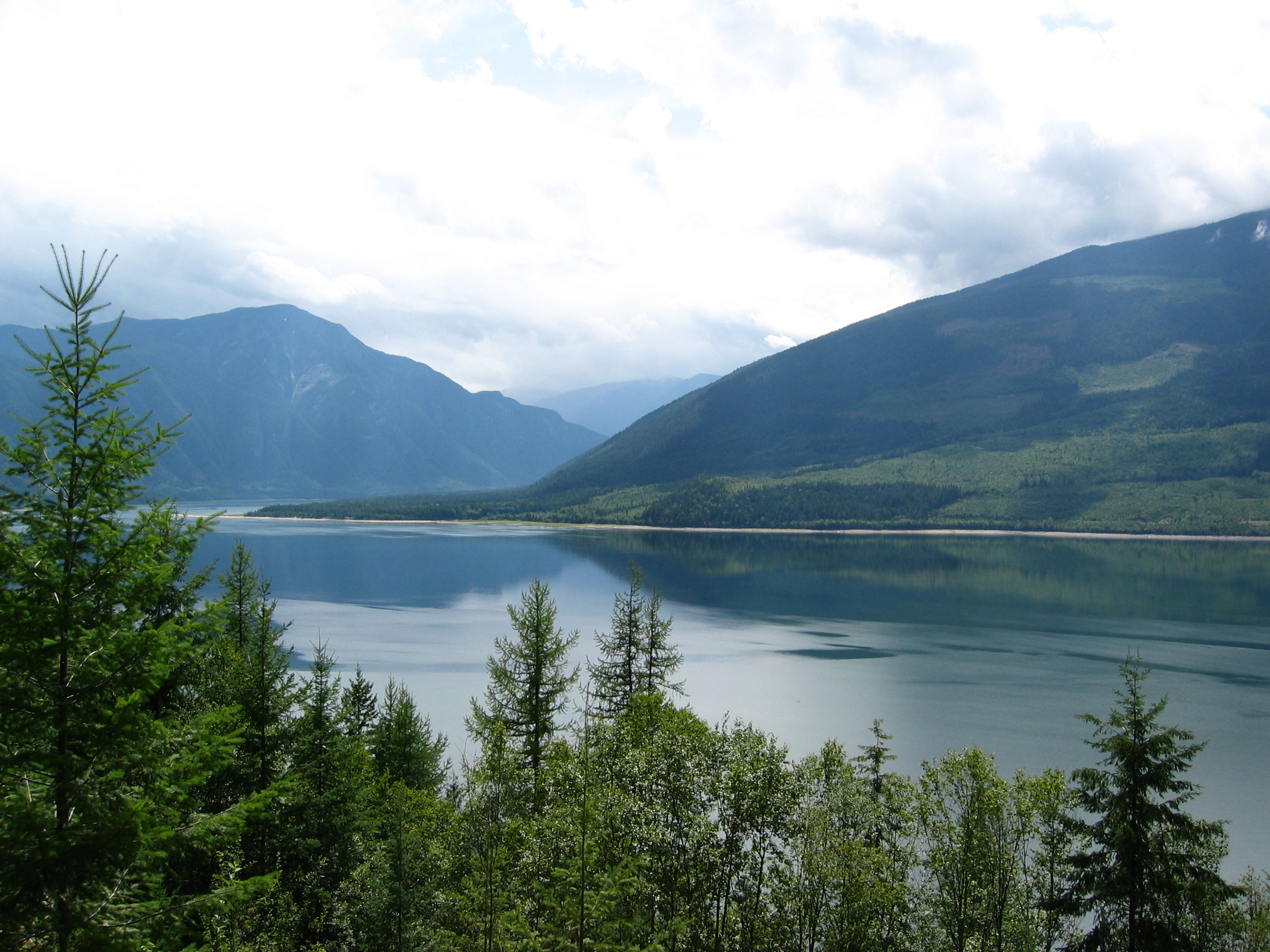
- Upper Arrow Lake, south of Nakusp

- Location within British Columbia Location within Canada Location within North America

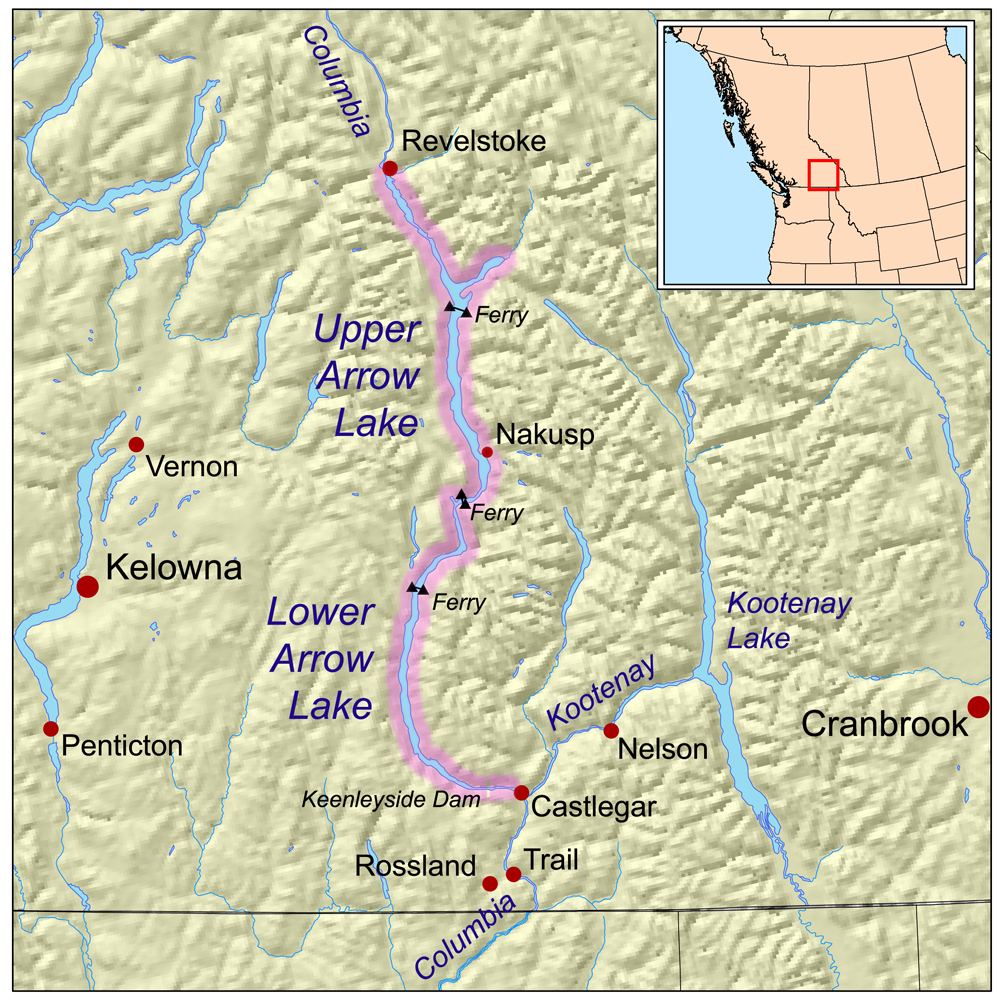
- Map highlighting the Arrow Lakes
- Coordinates: 50°00′00″N 118°00′00″W
- Surface elevation: 429 m (1,407 ft)

The Arrow Lakes in British Columbia, Canada, divided into Upper Arrow Lake and Lower Arrow Lake, are widenings of the Columbia River. The lakes are situated between the Selkirk Mountains to the east and the Monashee Mountains to the west. Beachland is fairly rare and is interspersed with rocky headlands and steep cliffs. Mountain sides are heavily forested, and rise sharply to elevations around 2,600 metres (8,500 ft).

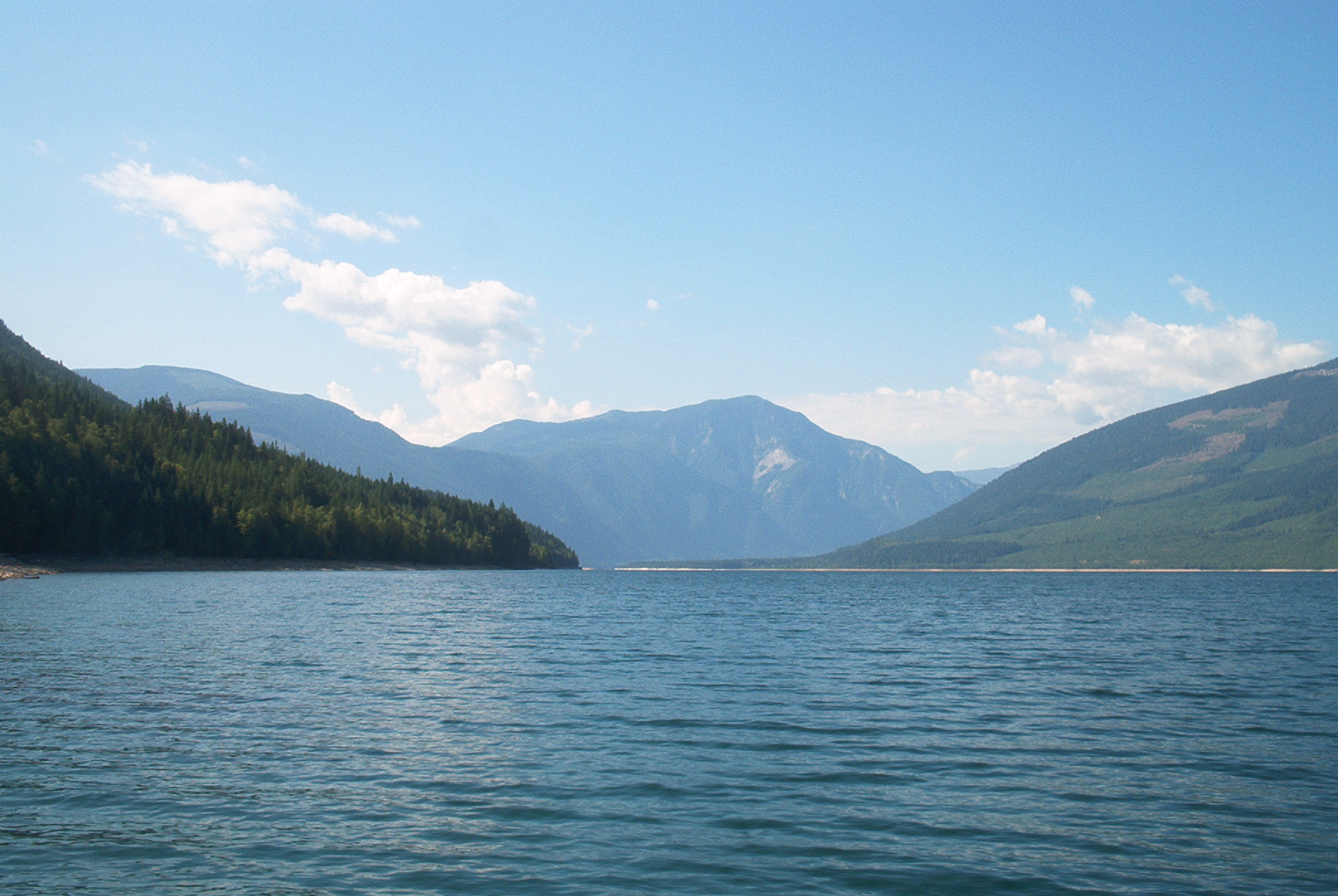
Upper Arrow Lake, British Columbia

Originally two lakes 23 kilometres (14 mi) apart, the Arrow Lakes became one 230-kilometre-long (140 mi) lake due to the reservoir created by the 1960s construction of the Keenleyside Dam; at low water the two lakes remain distinct, connected by a fast-moving section known as the Narrows. Damming the Lower Arrow Lake resulted in water rising 12 metres (39 ft) above natural levels. As a result of higher water, the valley lost two-thirds of its arable land. Approximately two thousand people were relocated. The Arrow Lakes stretches from just north of Castlegar in the south to Revelstoke in the north. Another hydroelectric development Whatshan Dam, diverted Whatshan Lake from the Whatshan River directly into the Arrow Lakes, just north of the Needles-Fauquier Ferry.

The Arrow Lakes are part of the traditional territory claims of the Sinixt, Okanagan and Ktunaxa peoples, though at the time of contact and during colonization only Sinixt lived along its shores.

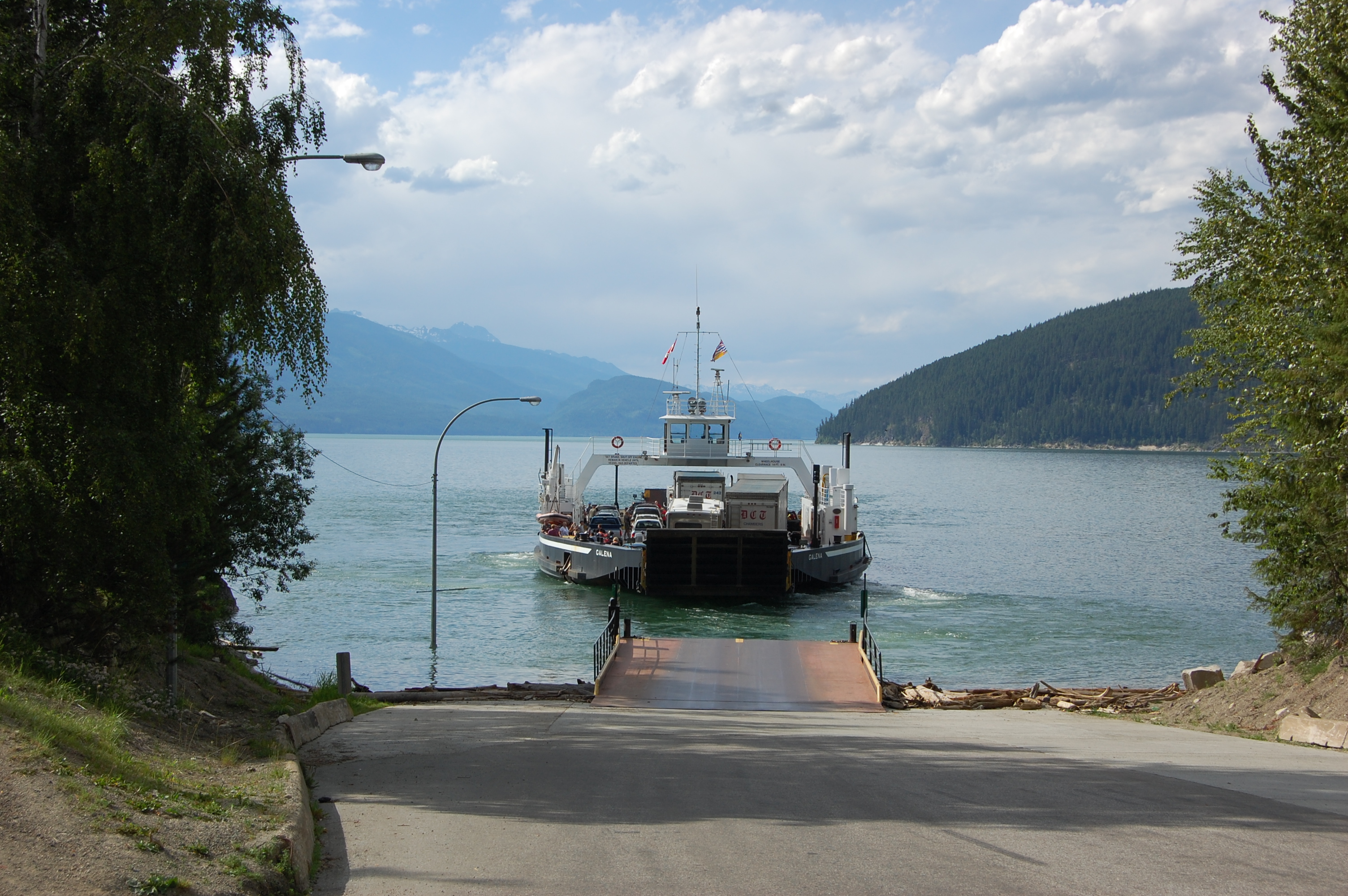
Free Ferry departs Galena Bay for Shelter Bay

== Crossings ==
There are three ferries:

- Upper Arrow Lake Ferry between Shelter Bay and Galena Bay at the northern end of Upper Arrow Lake, on BC Hwy 23.
- Needles Cable Ferry further south, linking Needles and Fauquier on BC Hwy 6 between Nakusp to the east and Vernon to the west.
- Arrow Park Ferry, a cable ferry across the junction of Upper and Lower Arrow Lakes at Arrow Park about 22 km south of Nakusp. Since 2020, the crossing has been serviced by an electric vessel.

The nearest bridges are upstream of the lakes at Revelstoke and downstream of the lakes at Castlegar.

== Name origin ==
The name Arrow Lakes, though in wide use, is unofficial; the gazetted names are for Upper Arrow Lake and Lower Arrow Lake, and BC Hydro refers to them together as the Arrow Lakes Reservoir. The origin of the name was a cultural feature known as Arrow Rock on the east shore of Lower Arrow Lake, about 35 km upstream from Castlegar, opposite the community of Renata, a large rock outcrop or overhang above the water, in the face of which was a hole filled with arrows. Different stories surround the meaning of the arrows, said to be shot there by the Lakes people (Sinixt) for good luck, either before or after war:

On October 19, 1826, while travelling south between Upper and Lower Arrow Lakes, Simpson passed "...The Arrow Rock, so named on account of a round hole in the face full of Arrows, said to have been fired at it by the Indians when practicing the Bow and Arrow before a war excursion." (Journal of Emilius Simpson; HBC Archives' accession B223/a/3 1826 Folio 39D-41) Source: included with note

"On our passage up the Columbia to the Boat Encampment, the Brigade had a spell and a smoke at this place. I recollect the boats were right under a high & perpendicular wall of rock, and the arrows were embedded in holes or hollows some 30 or 40 feet above us in the boat. Mr. Duncan Finlayson asked me in chinook if I wanted the arrows. I told him yes; he took up his shot gun & fired, bringing a number of them down broken. [The arrows] were picked up by the men and given to me but before doing so I remember they were closely examined.....being old voyageurs and men of Experience in Indian Arrows, they took great interest to Endeavor to solve the question by what tribe or nation were those arrows made. They examined the kind of wood, the cut of the feathers & even the denew, the number of turns it took to secure the feathers, but experts as they were they had to give it up — they could not solve it satisfactorily. I recollect there was something said of a large war party of Lake Indians or Upper Columbia River Indians invading the Kutanays or Mountaneirs. They had defeated the Mountaneirs and had captured a large quantity of arrows & having no further need of them expended them in those holes to commemorate the action. I am sure the spot is at the Lower Lake. I have made several enquiries of miners, boat-men and others, and strange to say not one of them ever saw...[the arrows]. I then began to think that I was mistaken, however questioned Big head Edward the chief of the Lake Indians. He told me there was such a place, but not speaking [his] language I could get no further information." (letter from Ranald Macdonald to Malcolm McLeod, 29 December 1890, held in Provincial Archives [accession details not cited on BC name card] ) Source: included with note

In the days before Columbus was born, the 'Indians' of the west and east Kootenay were at continual strife. It was customary for the west Kootenay Indians to winter along the southern Columbia and to ascend the stream every summer, to the lakes where hunting was good. As the tribes in the Slocan were always on the alert for war, they had their scouts out on the Arrow Lakes to note when their enemies came up the river. One summer the scouts returned from the [Arrow] Lakes with news that a particularly large force of warriors were going up the river. So the Slocan tribes prepared for war and crossed the mountains in force to Nakusp. On embarking from their canoes at Nakusp (the bay behind the long point) they noticed signs of a great storm having passed. On proceeding up the lake for some distance they came upon the force of the enemy. But alas ! There were none to resist them, for the great storm had apparently come suddenly upon them and there was nothing left but a heaving mass of canoe wreckage and dead bodies. The Slocan Indians took this as a great favour from the great 'Manatoo', and in token of respect they fired all their arrows at the high rock off which they lay, and wrote inscriptions on the face of the rock. Because of the vast wealth of arrow heads that fell to the bottom of the lake that day, the Indians named it Arrow Lake. (Relayed by Richard Blyth, as told to him by Chief Louis Joseph, Burton.) Source: BC place name cards, or correspondence to/from BC's Chief Geographer or BC Geographical Names Office.

== Gallery ==
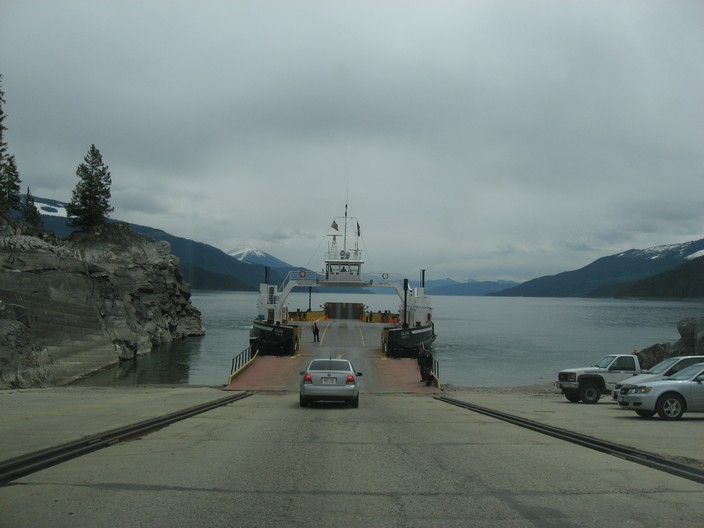

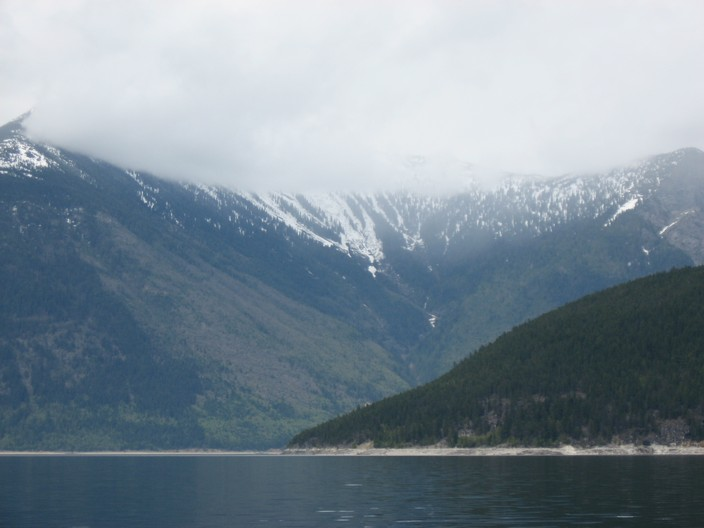

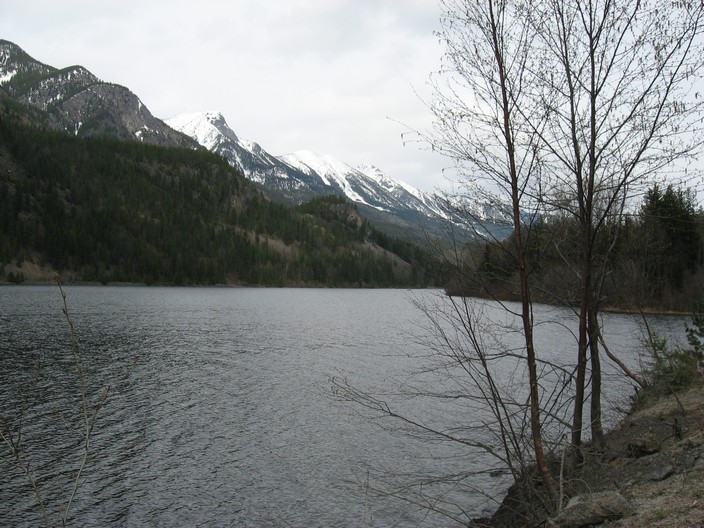

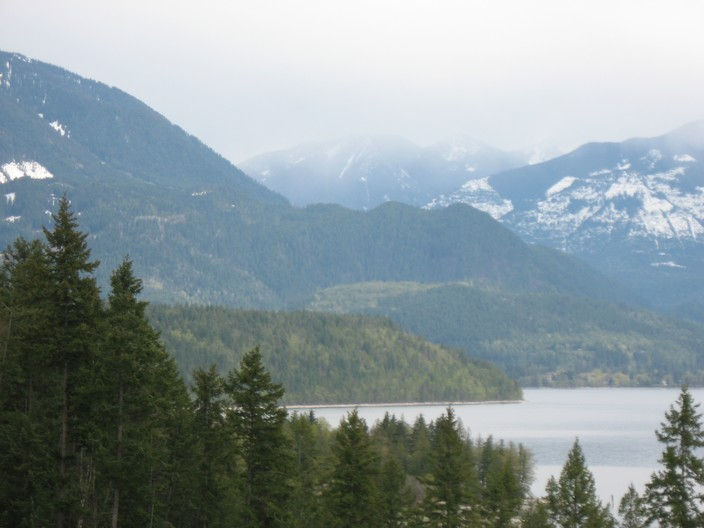

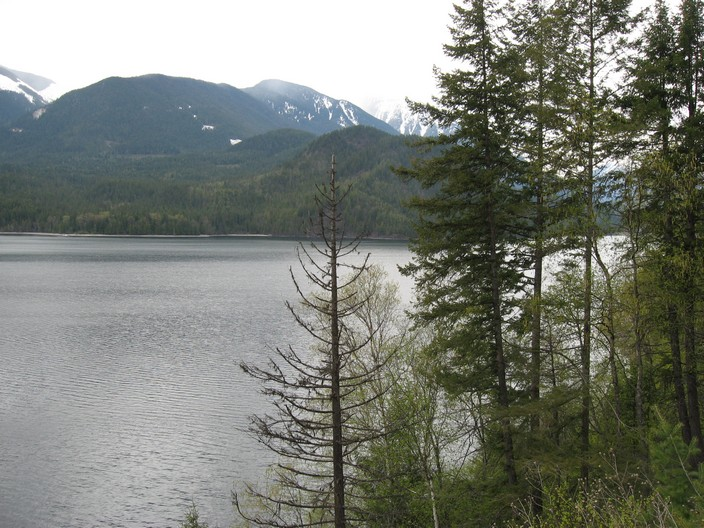

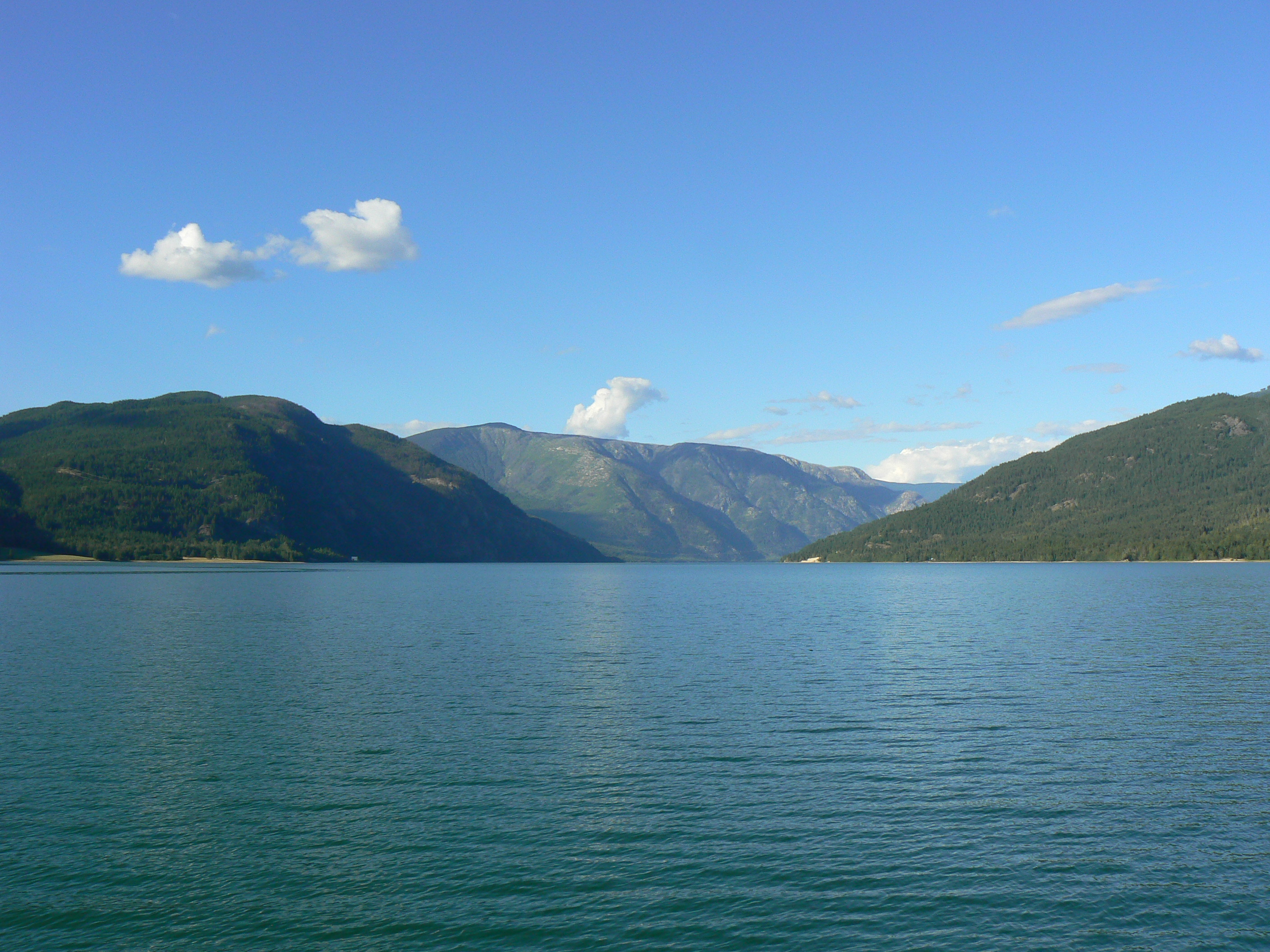

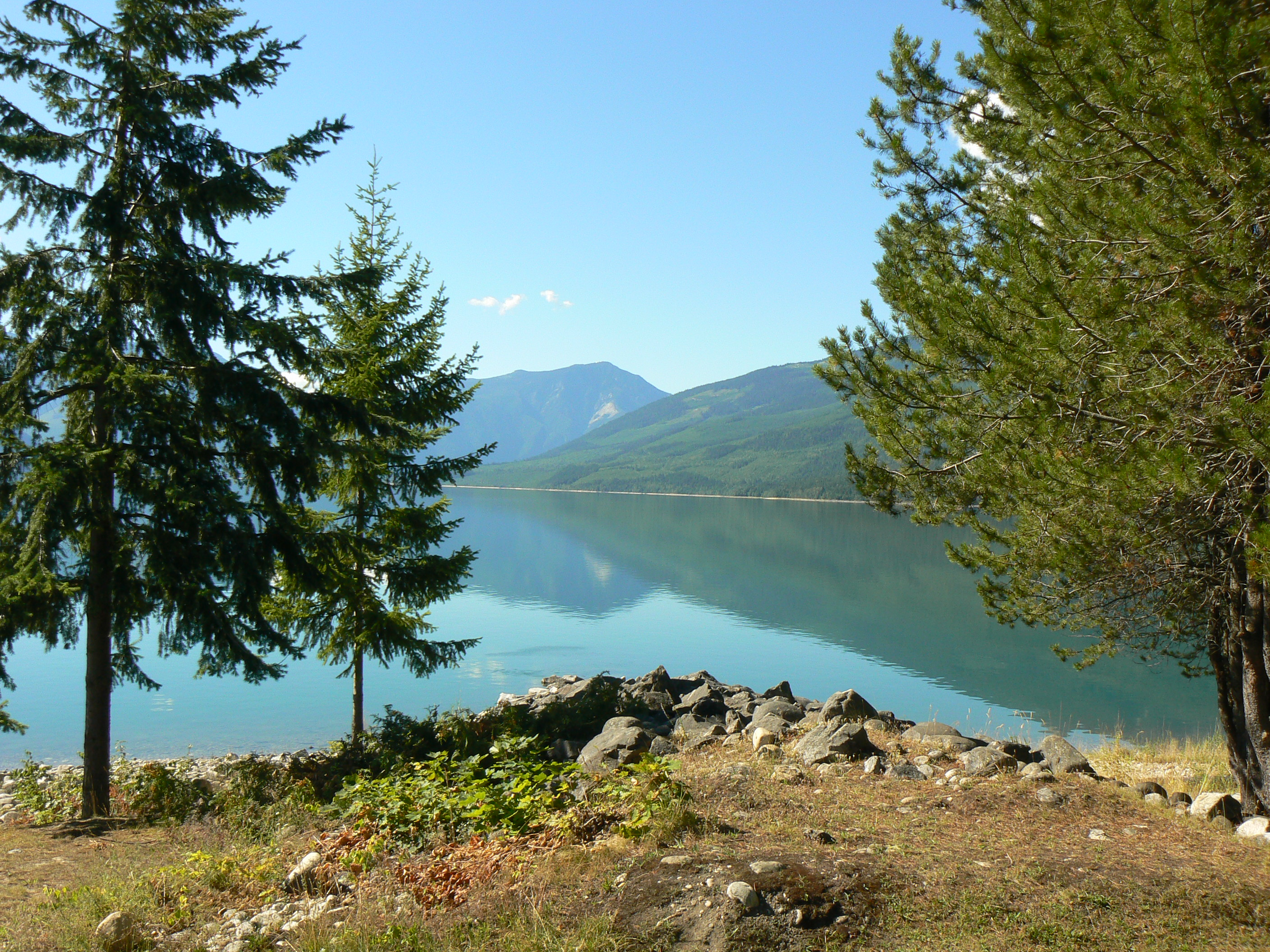

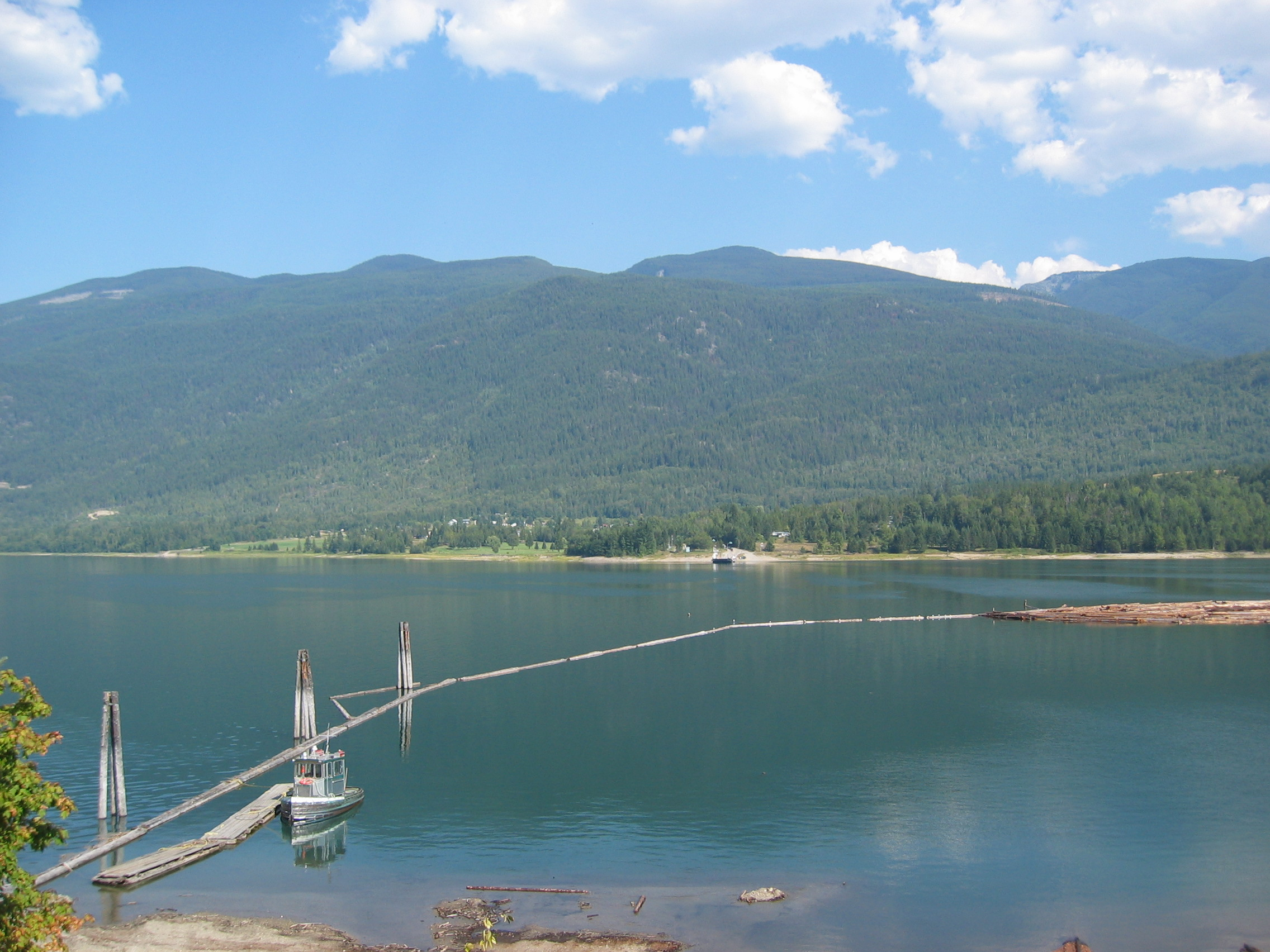

== See also ==
- List of lakes of British Columbia
- British Columbia Ferries
- Nakusp, British Columbia
- Steamboats of the Arrow Lakes
