= List of cities on the Columbia River =

Listed in order going downstream:

- British Columbia:
  - Headwaters to the Canada–United States border:
    - Canal Flats
    - Fairmont Hot Springs
    - Windermere
    - Invermere
    - Radium Hot Springs
    - Spillimacheen
    - Golden
    - Mica Creek
    - Revelstoke
    - Nakusp
    - Castlegar
    - Trail
- Washington:
  - Canada–United States border to Grand Coulee Dam:
    - Northport
    - Kettle Falls
    - Inchelium
    - Grand Coulee
    - Coulee Dam
  - Grand Coulee Dam to Wenatchee:
    - Elmer City
    - Bridgeport
    - Brewster
    - Pateros
    - Entiat
    - West Wenatchee
  - Wenatchee
  - East Wenatchee
  - South Wenatchee
  - South Wenatchee to Wallula:
    - Rock Island
    - Vantage
    - Desert Aire
    - Richland
    - Kennewick
    - Pasco
    - Burbank
    - Wallula
- Washington-Oregon border:
  - Umatilla to The Dalles:
    - Umatilla, Oregon
    - Irrigon, Oregon
    - Boardman, Oregon
    - Roosevelt, Washington
    - Arlington, Oregon
    - Rufus, Oregon
    - Maryhill, Washington
    - Biggs Junction, Oregon
    - Wishram, Washington
    - Dallesport, Washington
    - The Dalles, Oregon
  - The Dalles to Portland:
    - Lyle, Washington
    - Rowena, Oregon
    - Mosier, Oregon
    - Bingen, Washington
    - White Salmon, Washington
    - Hood River, Oregon
    - Carson River Valley, Washington
    - Stevenson, Washington
    - Cascade Locks, Oregon
    - North Bonneville, Washington
    - Washougal, Washington
    - Camas, Washington
    - Vancouver, Washington
  - Portland to the mouth of the Columbia:
    - Portland, Oregon
    - St. Helens, Oregon
    - Columbia City, Oregon
    - Kalama, Washington
    - Goble, Oregon
    - Prescott, Oregon
    - Rainier, Oregon
    - Longview, Washington
    - Cathlamet, Washington
    - Astoria, Oregon
    - Warrenton, Oregon
    - Chinook, Washington
    - Ilwaco, Washington

== See also ==
- Columbia River
- Tributaries of the Columbia River
- Hydroelectric dams on the Columbia River
