= Goble, Oregon =

Unincorporated community in the state of Oregon, United States

- Unincorporated community
- Location within the state of Oregon
- Coordinates: 46°0′58″N 122°52′27″W
- Country: United States
- State: Oregon
- County: Columbia
- Time zone: UTC-8 (Pacific (PST))
  - Summer (DST): UTC-7 (PDT)
- ZIP code: 97048
- Area codes: 503 and 971

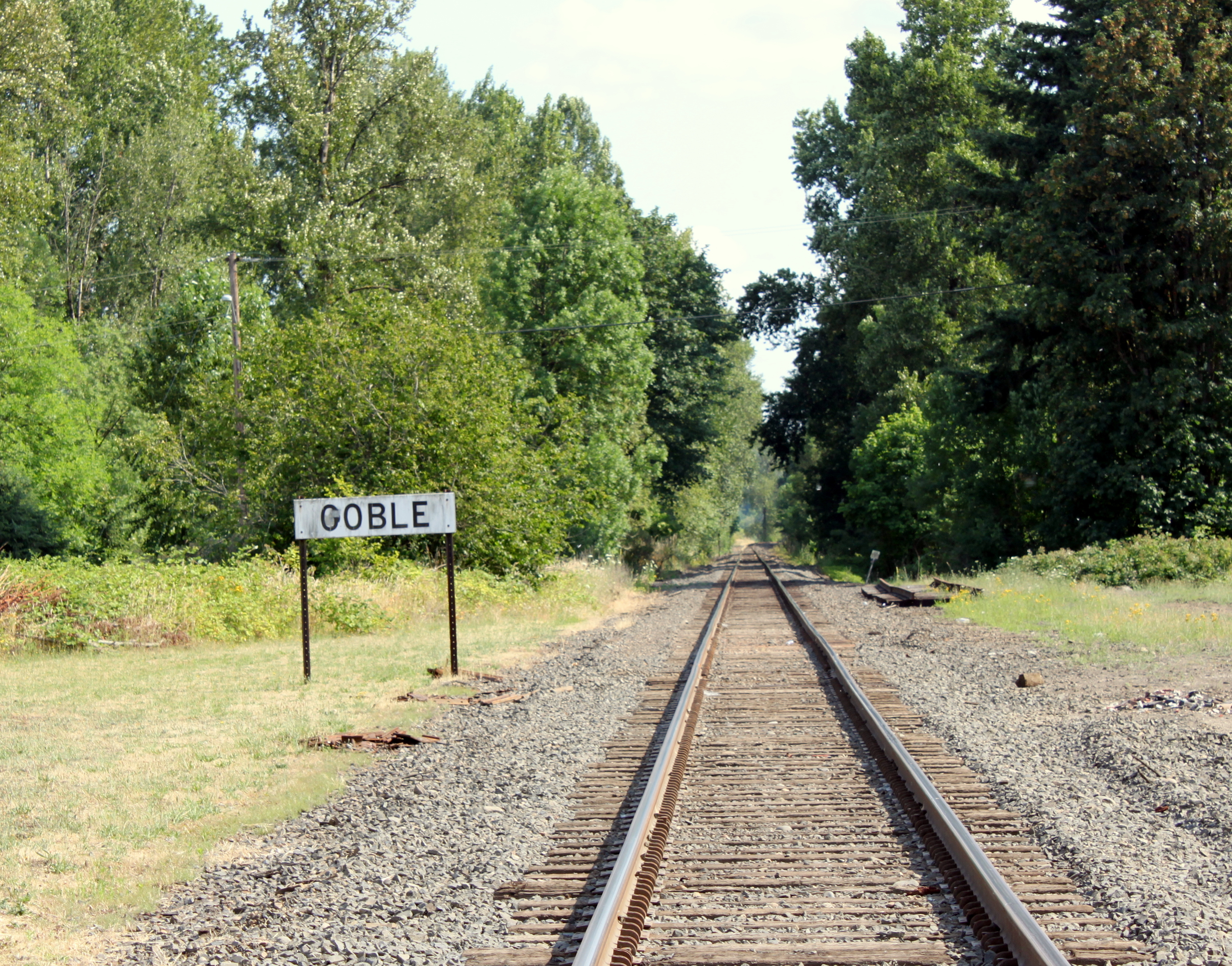
Train sign for Goble

Goble is an unincorporated community in Columbia County, Oregon, United States. It is located on U.S. Route 30 and the Columbia River.

== History ==
The Goble area was most likely a stop for the Lewis and Clark Expedition.

Goble was first settled by Daniel B. Goble in 1853. He took up a donation land claim and later sold it to George S. Foster, who laid out a town and named it after Goble. Until there was a railroad bridge built across the Columbia River at Vancouver, Washington, Goble was the Oregon terminus for the train ferry to Kalama, Washington. Goble had a post office from 1894 to 1960. The history of the area is complicated because there are at five or six different community names applied to at least three locations in close proximity to each other all dating to about the same era. These names include: Hunters, Reuben, Goble, Mooreville, Red Town, Enterprise aka Enterprise Landing, and arguably Beaver Homes.

The history of the area begins with the selection of Kalama, Washington, as the beginning point for the construction of the Pacific Division of the Northern Pacific Railroad in 1870. At least by 1879, there was a landing on the Oregon side of the Columbia River across from Kalama known as Enterprise Landing. Reuben was a post office name assigned to the location when a post office was sought in 1890 and it was found that the name Enterprise was already taken. The physical location is given to be about a mile south of the present day Goble. Reuben was named for the brother of the first postmaster, Reuben R. Foster. Scheduled Rail service of the Northern Pacific Railway from Tacoma to Kalama began on January 5, 1874. It connected to regular riverboat traffic on the Columbia River. However the Northern Pacific Railroad was chartered to construct transcontinental railroad and telegraph lines between Lake Superior and Puget Sound and completing the connection required a Portland to Kalama route. In 1877, Oregon Senator John Mitchell sponsored legislation calling for the Northern Pacific to forfeit 7,000,000 acres (28,000 km^{2}) of land grants unless they completed a line to Kalama "as far as practicable along the Oregon side of the Columbia River". The bill didn't pass congress, but on September 8, 1883, the Last spike was driven at Gold Creek, Montana to close the gap in the Rocky Mountain Division section of the Northern Pacific Railroad. A special train celebrating the opening of the transcontinental line arrived in Tacoma on September 13, 1883, which had traveled over the Portland-Hunters line. The Train Ferry Tacoma would go in service the following year.

Hunters, being the railroad ferry site, was also the site of the first post office in the area called "Hunters", which was established May 29, 1888. Hunters was a location about two miles (3 km) south of present-day Goble, and was soon abandoned by the Northern Pacific Railroad in favor of a new ferry slip at Goble. There is no good record of when the move was made, but the Hunters post office was closed to Reuben in October 1893, and Goble was platted in 1891.

== Train ferry ==
Before there was a railroad bridge between Portland, Oregon and Vancouver, Washington, Goble was the site of an important train ferry. The Northern Pacific Railroad had built a railroad on the Oregon side of the Columbia River to Goble. In the 1880s, the company bought the second largest ferry in the world and shipped it to Oregon. In order to ship the ferry, crews disassembled it into 57,159 pieces and shipped it around Cape Horn. The ferry, named The Tacoma, was reassembled in Portland and it transported trains across the Columbia first from Hunters and later from Goble to Kalama, Washington from 1884 until 1908.

== Economy ==
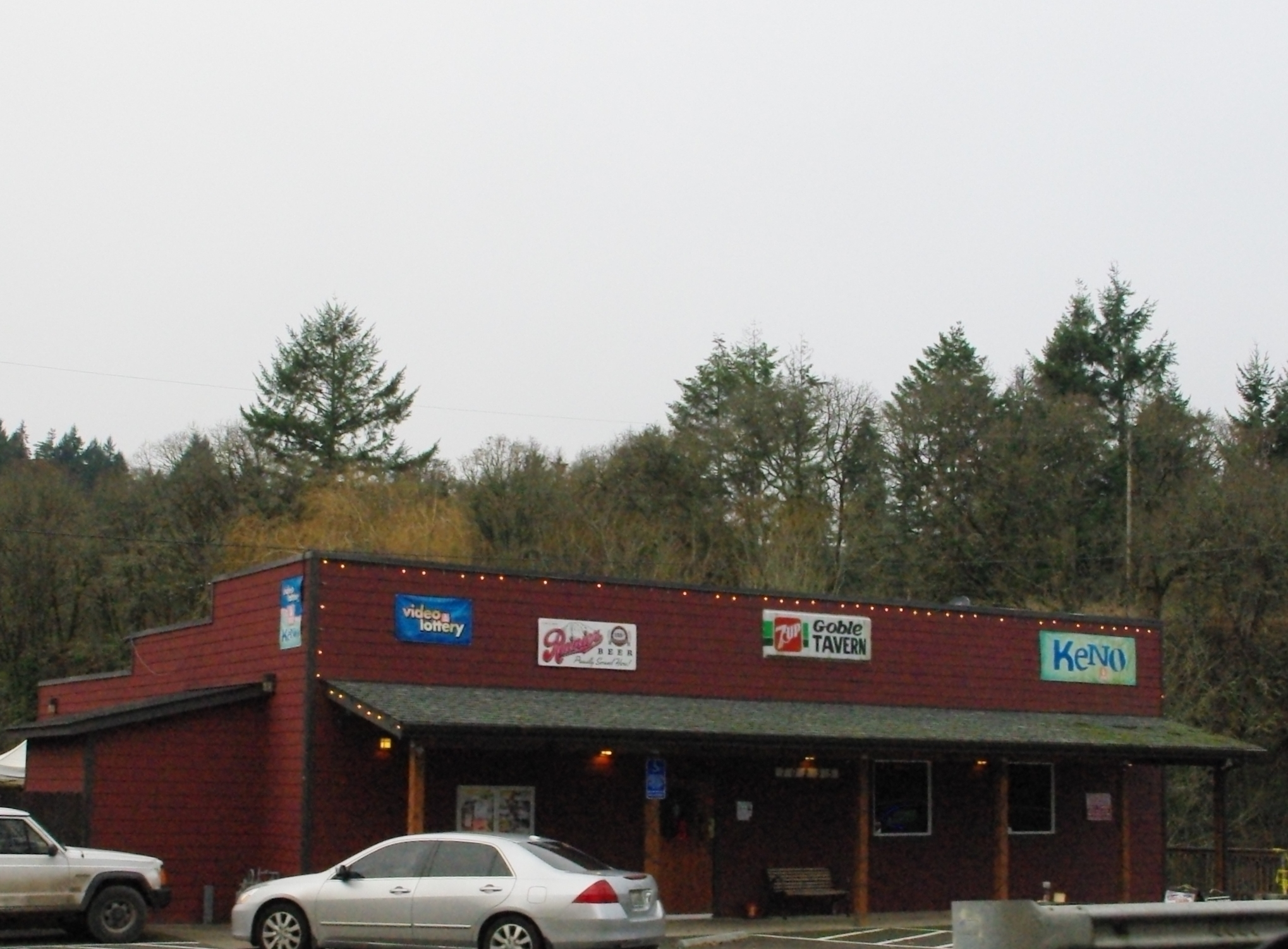
The Goble Tavern along Highway 30

In the 1890s, Goble was a boomtown, supported by logging, the wood-fired Columbia River steamboats that stopped there for refueling, and as many as six trains that stopped in the community daily on the way to Seattle.

Today there are few businesses remaining in Goble, but the Goble Tavern remains open.

While Rainier is most often cited as the home of the Trojan Nuclear Power Plant, it is actually closer to Goble and Prescott.

== Points of interest ==
Goble is home to the Goble Caves and other unique geological formations that produce rare crystals. Two types of Zeolite, called Tschernichite and Boggsite, were first discovered in Goble.

Deer Island, an uninhabited Columbia River island where Lewis and Clark stopped in 1805 and 1806, lies in the Columbia River upstream from Goble. The community of Deer Island is nearby on the Oregon side of the mainland.

== See also ==
- Cities on the Columbia River
- Historic ferries in Oregon
- Northern Pacific Railway
- U.S. Route 30 in Oregon
