= Kalama River =

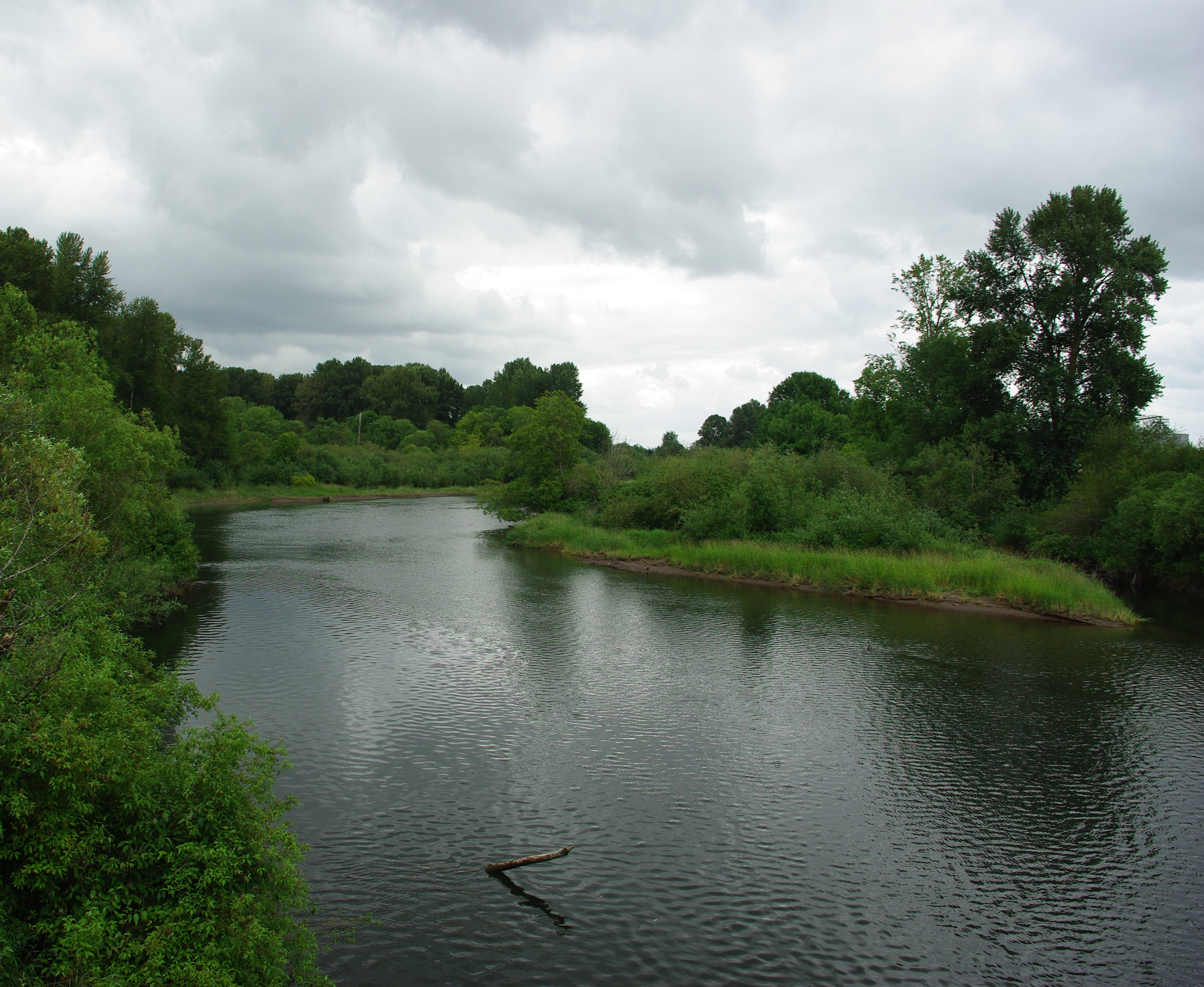
- Near the mouth at Kalama

- Location of the mouth of Kalama River in Washington Kalama River (the United States)

Location
- Country: United States
- State: Washington
- County: Cowlitz

Physical characteristics
- Source: Kalama Spring
  - location: Mount St. Helens National Volcanic Monument
  - coordinates: 46°08′44″N 122°15′05″W
  - elevation: 2,890 ft (880 m)
- Mouth: Columbia River
  - location: near Kalama
  - coordinates: 46°02′01″N 122°52′13″W
  - elevation: 10 ft (3.0 m)
- Length: 45 mi (72 km)
- Basin size: 205 sq mi (530 km^{2})
- Discharge
  - average: 1,219 cu ft/s (34.5 m^{3}/s)

The Kalama River is a 45-mile (72 km) tributary of the Columbia River, in the U.S. state of Washington. It flows entirely within Cowlitz County, Washington. Calama River is an old variant name.

Gabriel Franchere in 1811 wrote of the Indian village at the mouth of the Kalama River, adding that it was called Thlakalamah.

== Course ==
The Kalama River originates in the Cascade Range just south of Mount St. Helens. It flows generally west, joining the Columbia River near Kalama, 73 miles (117 km) upstream of the larger river's mouth on the Pacific Ocean.

== See also ==
- List of rivers of Washington (state)
- Tributaries of the Columbia River
