= Danielle Egnew =

American singer-songwriter

- Occupations: Psychic; musician; activist; media personality

Danielle Egnew is an American psychic medium, musician, media personality, and activist. Egnew currently resides in Billings with her wife Rebecca Douglas, whom she married on November 20, 2014.

== Music ==
Egnew is a singer/songwriter/composer in the areas of pop, rock, alternative rock, country, industrial, and folk.

Egnew has served as the frontwoman, writer, and producer for several projects including female alternative rock band Pope Jane from 1996 to 2008, and Backseat Bordello, an acoustic guitar and vocal duo formed in 2009 with Pope Jane drummer Kristen Coyner.

Egnew is a music producer within the pop, rock, and country-crossover genres. She has been noted in magazine articles and interviews as a strong female producer due to creative production choices and musical direction and commitment to budget. In 2010, Egnew produced Pope Jane bassist Holly Shawver's rock solo project, The Holly Shawver Project, also contributing vocal arrangement, backing vocals, and rhythm guitar.

In 2008, Egnew signed a multi-tiered recording contract with Maurice The Fish Records, allowing her to create music in several different genres simultaneously. Her first label release, Red Lodge, was nominated for the 2008 NAMMY Awards in the Best Folk Recording category. In 2011, she co-founded Tin Star Records (2011–2013) with Roy Pack. In 2013 Egnew was named as co-owner of Maurice The Fish Records with Raymond Hayden, (2008–2018) raising her total ownership in recording labels to three including Ave Vox Music Group.

As a composer, Egnew writes film scores and television theme music for a number of broadcast endeavors including the feature films Montgomery House: The Perfect Haunting, Changing Spots, and the short film Tough Love.

== Film, television and stage ==
After attending the University of Arizona musical theater and Eastern Montana College theater on full-ride scholarships, Egnew went on to be an actor, film producer and screenwriter. Her original screenplay Thunder Walk was optioned by Los Angeles production entity Light Renegade Entertainment (2003).

Danielle Egnew stars as herself in the TV docuseries The Road Angel (in production, 2020–present), detailing her work as an angel translator. The TV docuseries was awarded a $50,000 grant from the governor of Montana for its filming efforts within the state.

Egnew is also part of the 2019 cast of American Mystery on Travel Channel, appearing as herself in a UFOlogist capacity.

Danielle Egnew has served as a research and creative consultant on popular paranormal TV programs Supernatural on CW, America's Psychic Challenge on Lifetime, and the feature film Man of Steel.

In 2009 Egnew wrote, produced, directed and starred in the feature length paranormal documentary Montgomery House: The Perfect Haunting, chronicling the haunted history of the Montgomery House Bed and Breakfast in Kalama, Washington. Egnew appeared as herself onscreen in the documentary, which was written, produced, and directed by Egnew through her production company Ave Vox Entertainment. The film contains Egnew's contributed musical score.

Egnew has made other numerous TV appearances both as an actor and as herself, as well as garnering a classical and contemporary theatrical career beginning in 1987. As an actress, Egnew starred as "Peg Franklin" in the Clear Pictures feature film Changing Spots (2008), for which she is also credited as a Producer.

While at The University of Arizona, Egnew was one of the first featured female members of the sketch comedy group Comedy Corner, sharing Comedy Corner alumni status with other notables such as Saturday Night Live writer Alex Baze.

In 2011, Egnew was a cast member and Associate Producer during the three-day all-celebrity charity performances of The Vagina Monologues for V-Day Valley LA. She has contributed as a repeat bi-coastal cast member of The Vagina Monologues for both the 2007 V-Day WestLA Celebrity Charity Cast, as well as the 2006 V-Day New York Celebrity Charity Cast.

== Radio ==
Danielle Egnew hosts the paranormal, spiritual and world events podcast InPsight Radio.

In 2006 Danielle Egnew launched the paranormal website Haunted Playground., which in February 2010 became Haunted Playground with Sheena Metal and Danielle Egnew, a paranormal talk radio show on LA Talk Radio with a companion webseries, both co-hosted by Egnew and talk radio veteran Sheena Metal. Egnew left the radio program in 2014.

Danielle Egnew has hosted and co-hosted several talk radio shows including The High Road (2004–2006), Truth be Told with Psychic / Medium, Pamela Beaty (2012-2013), Haunted Playground with Sheena Metal (2010–2014), Psight Unseen (2014–2015), and The Soul (2014) with Roy Pack. She produced the world-syndicated talk-music hybrid The Music Highway with Sheena Metal.

== Psychic ==
Danielle Egnew appears as herself in television, film, and radio as a psychic and medium. In this capacity she has starred for a pilot episode of a series on cold cases entitled Missing Peace and participated with investigation of the paranormal. Danielle Egnew has worked as a content consultant on paranormal-themed television series Supernatural (CW) and America's Psychic Challenge (Lifetime).

In 2011, Egnew launched The Call To Light Press, a blog whose content reflects spiritual, paranormal and extra terrestrial interests. She tours the United States as a keynote speaker and lecturer.

In 2012 Danielle Egnew authored the book True Tales of the Truly Weird: Real Paranormal Accounts from a Real Psychic, detailing her alleged encounters with paranormal phenomenon. Egnew was named Psychic of the Year and Top UFOlogists of 2012 by UFO's and Supernatural Magazine.

== Activism ==
Egnew is an advocate for same-sex marriage rights, acting as a celebrity endorser for a number of local and national campaigns including Virginia's VoteNO campaign, providing PSAs and print materials for the endeavor.

In the past, Egnew has worked on a number of campaigns, including support for the Washington Death with Dignity Act, for the legal upholding of living wills in a court of law, and for universal health care in Washington State.

== Awards & honors ==
Egnew is a former voting Member of the Academy of Recording Arts and Sciences – The Grammys.

At the 2017 Native American Music Awards (NAMMYS), Egnew's solo album "You've Got To Go Back The Way That You Came" won as Best Country Recording. The singer was also nominated for "Best Female Vocalist".

At the 2008 Native American Music Awards (NAMMYS), Egnew's solo album "Red Lodge" (Maurice The Fish Records) was nominated as Best Folk Recording.

At the 2007 All Access Music Awards, Egnew won "Best Keyboardist". She was also nominated as "Best Overall Songwriter" and "Best Female Rock Vocalist".

At the 2006 All Access Music Awards, Egnew won "Best Female Guitarist" and enjoying nominations in the "Best Female Pop / Alternative Vocalist" and "Best Overall Songwriter" categories.

== Discography ==
- 2017 – You've Got To Go Back The Way That You Came (solo)
- 2010 – Backseat Bordello (with Kristen Coyner)
- 2010 – Wayne's Waitress: The Holly Shawver Project (Producer)
- 2010 – Tough Love Film Score
- 2009 – Montgomery House: The Perfect Haunting Film Score
- 2008 – Red Lodge (solo)
- 2008 – Changing Spots Film Score
- 2007 – Junkie Cousin (EP)
- 2006 – Otherworld (ambient)
- 2006 – Wild Lamb (Solo)
- 2005 – Rise (ambient)
- 2004 – Vast (ambient)
- 2004 – Pulse (ambient)
- 2003 – Dog and Pony Show (Pope Jane)
- 2001 – Industry Whore (Pope Jane)
- 2000 – Hide Me From The Moon (Pope Jane)
- 1998 – Relief (Pope Jane)
- 1996 – Pope Jane (Self Titled)
- 1995 – Country vs Western (with Wayne Lembcke)
- 1992 – Danielle Marae Live

== See also ==
- List of ambient music artists
