= Kalama Middle/High School =

Coordinates: 46°00′30″N 122°50′17″W

Kalama High School
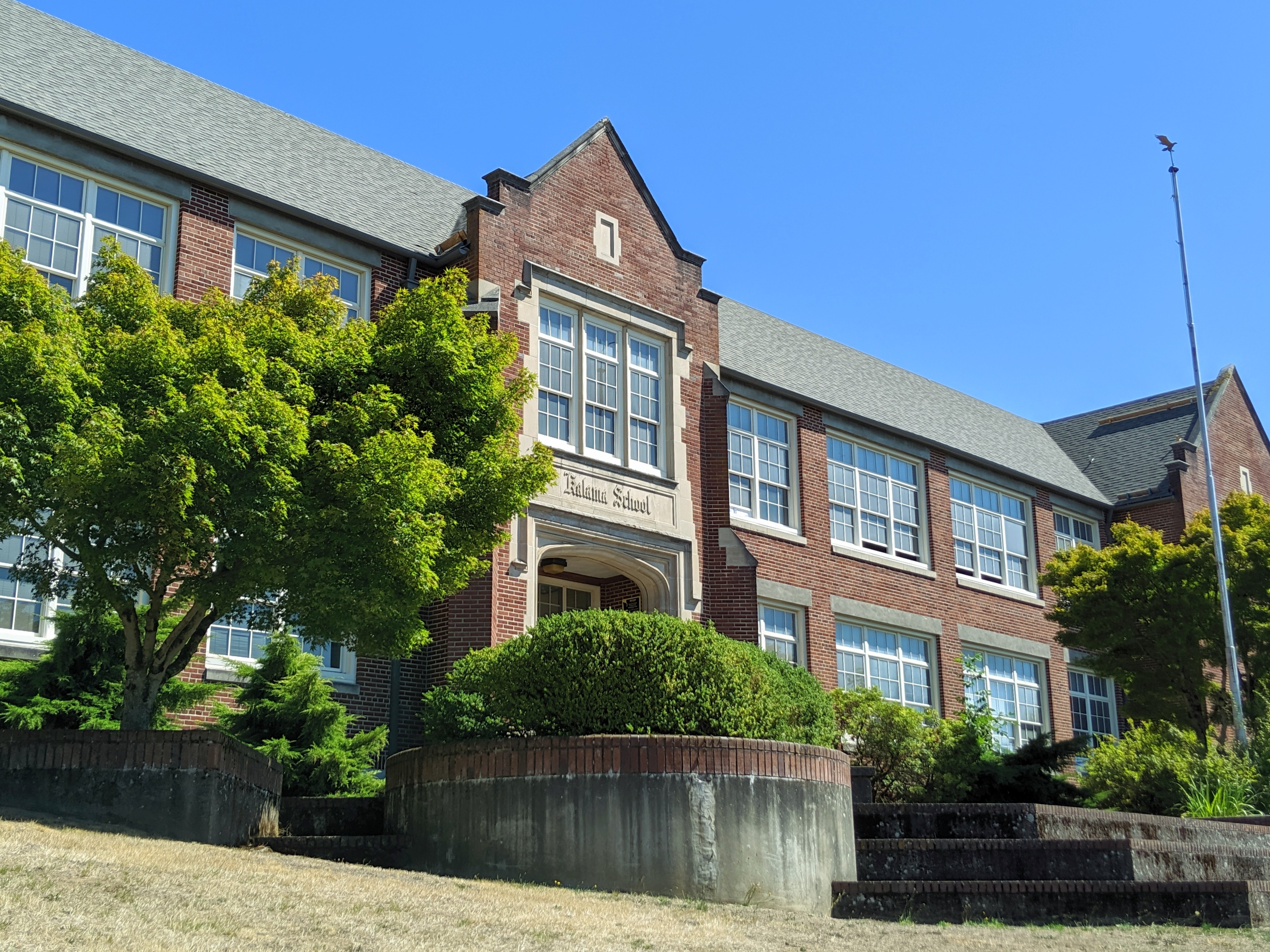

Location
- 548 China Garden Road; Kalama, Washington; United States

Information
- Type: Public
- School district: Kalama School District
- Superintendent: Jennifer McCallum
- Principal: Heidi Bunker
- Teaching staff: 20.91 (FTE)
- Grades: 9-12
- Enrollment: 356 (2023–2024)
- Student to teacher ratio: 21.69
- Colors: Orange, Black, and White
- Nickname: Chinooks
- Website: https://www.kalamaschools.org/o/khs

Kalama High School is a public high school located in Kalama, Washington. It is part of the Kalama School District. The school serves students in grades 9–12 and shares its campus with Kalama Middle School (which serves grades 6–8) and the district office. As of the 2021–2022 school year, Kalama High School had an enrollment of approximately 345 students, and a four-year graduation rate of 91%. Kalama Middle School had an enrollment of 266 students.

Voter-approved bond dollars and state grant funds awarded to Kalama School District enabled the middle and high school to receive facility upgrades in 2020 and 2021. In August 2020, the third floor of Kalama High School was transformed into science labs and a STEM classroom . Then, in the fall of 2021, a new 33,000-square-foot (3,100 m^{2}) secondary building opened to students featuring six classrooms, two learning commons, two science labs, two science prep rooms, a maker-space, library, media center, cafeteria and more.

== Location ==
Kalama High School and Kalama Middle School are located at the top of a hill east of downtown Kalama. The hill has been nicknamed "High School Hill." The school gained additional recognition as it was used as the high school in the movie Twilight (2008).

== Athletics & extracurricular activities ==
Middle and high school students in Kalama have the opportunity to participate in a variety of extracurricular activities. High school students are able to join clubs such as Drama Club and Future Farmers of America (FFA). High school athletics include: Boys Basketball, Girls Basketball, Girls Volleyball, Cross Country, Wrestling, Football, Girls Soccer, Boys Baseball, Girls Fastpitch Softball, Varsity Cheerleading and Track and Field.

=== State champions ===
- Basketball: 1949, 1950
- Football: 1952, 1998, 2017, 2018, 2021
- Soccer: 2021
- Softball: 1996, 2000
- Volleyball: 2016

=== State runners-up ===
- Baseball: 1994, 2006, 2008, 2009
- Basketball: 1948, 1951, 1977
- Football: 1999, 2019
- Softball: 1998
- Volleyball: 1995, 1998
- Soccer: 2017

== Demographics (district-wide) ==
As of the 2021–2022 school year, Kalama School District had a student population that was 51.8% male and 48.2% female. The ethnic breakdown of students was as follow: 82.6% Caucasian, 11.9% Hispanic/Latino, 1.5% two or more races, 1.3% African American, 1.2% Native American/Alaskan Native, 1% Asian, 0.5% Native Hawaiian/Pacific Islander.
