= Montgomery House Bed and Breakfast =

Reportedly haunted location in Washington state

Coordinates: 46°00′25″N 122°50′38″W

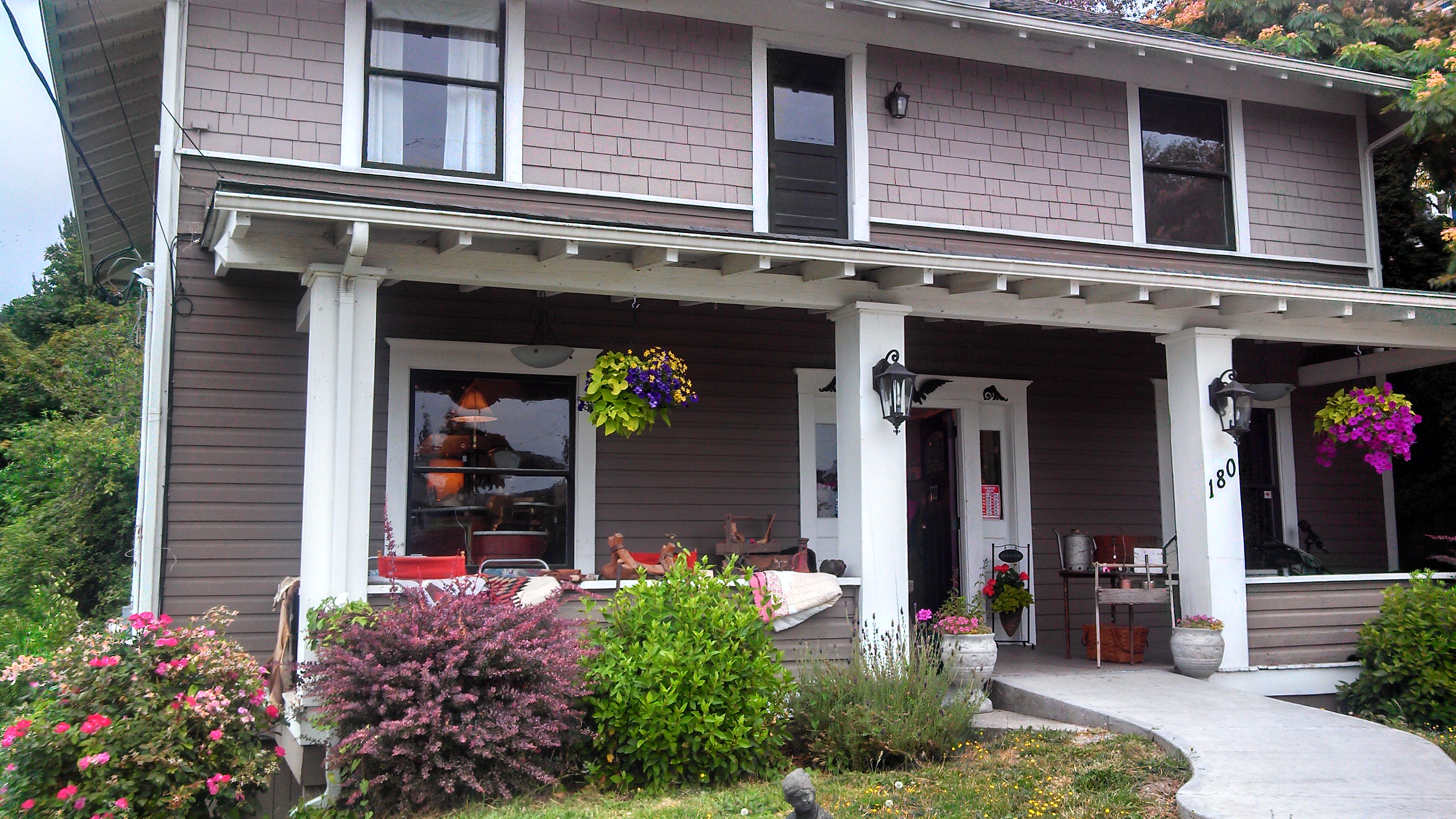
Montgomery house, Kalama WA

Reported to be one of the most haunted locations in Kalama, Washington, by townsfolk and former occupants, Montgomery House Bed and Breakfast was built in 1908 on former Cowlitz Indian land in Kalama, Washington, a logging town along the Columbia River now known for its antiques. Montgomery House Bed and Breakfast was the subject of the 2009 feature film documentary "Montgomery House: The Perfect Haunting" written and directed by psychic and medium Danielle Egnew.

The two story Craftsman structure was originally built in 1908 as single family home. During the Pacific Northwest logging boom of the early 20th century, the home was converted into a bordello which contained a doctor's clinic, whose operating room was located in the home's current dining area. By 1930 the home was converted into a nine-room hospital, each room containing a pot bellied stove. In the 1960s, the home was again purchased and turned into a single family residence. Eventually the home fell into disrepair. During the early 1990s the ground floor was boarded up and the home was used as storage for an antique store in Kalama. In 2006, the home was purchased by Eric and Julianna Montgomery, who then restored the derelict property and in 2008 re-opened the structure as Montgomery House Bed and Breakfast.,

The land on which the home was constructed was once a congregating site for the Cowlitz Indian Tribe, a native group who was widely scattered along the Columbia River Basin. Due to illnesses brought in from Western settlers, the Cowlitz tribe fell victim to diseases such as small pox and malaria, the latter being brought up the river by mosquitos trapped in the water barrels of ships coming up the Columbia River from the tropics. The Cowlitz tribe suffered tremendous losses in population over a 60-year period spanning from the late 18th century to the late 19th century as western trade routes were dominated by explorers and settlers. The losses are estimated at tens of thousands, even being documented by explorers Lewis and Clark, who wrote of smelling a village of decaying bodies as they proceeded down the Columbia River.

The alleged paranormal activity containted on the property of the Montgomery House Bed and Breakfast is said to be tied to not only the tens of thousands of Native American deaths that took place in the area, but also the geographical attributes of the land on which the house was built. The property has been long reported by guests, Kalama townsfolk, and the home's former owners, Eric and Julianna Montgomery, to be haunted. Solid bodied apparitions as well as clear disembodied voices, or EVPs, were captured on film in Montgomery House: The Perfect Haunting. Eric and Julianna Montgomery left the residence in March 2009, four months after the documentary was filmed.

In March 2013, the property was bought by Colin and Allison Norton and is now a private residence.
