= Prescott, Oregon =

- City
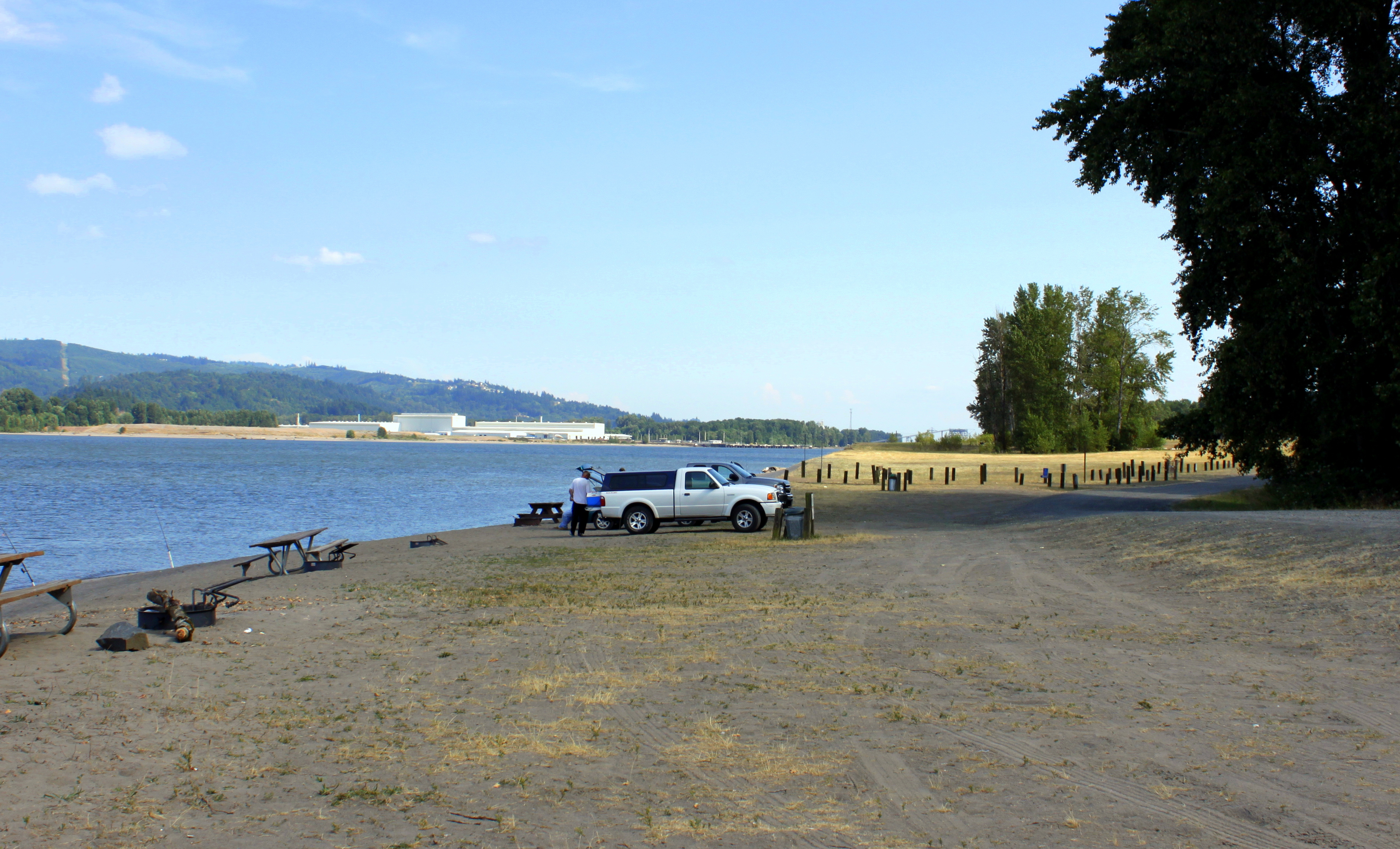
- Fishermen along the Columbia River at Prescott Beach County Park

- Location in Oregon
- Coordinates: 46°02′56″N 122°53′16″W
- Country: United States
- State: Oregon
- County: Columbia
- Incorporated: 1947

Government
  - Mayor: Laurie Blair

Area
  - Total: 0.069 sq mi (0.18 km^{2})
  - Land: 0.069 sq mi (0.18 km^{2})
  - Water: 0 sq mi (0.00 km^{2})
- Elevation: 52 ft (16 m)

Population (2020)
  - Total: 82
  - Density: 1,185.7/sq mi (457.79/km^{2})
- Time zone: UTC-8 (Pacific)
  - Summer (DST): UTC-7 (Pacific)
- ZIP code: 97048
- Area codes: 503 and 971
- FIPS code: 41-59750
- GNIS feature ID: 2411488

Prescott is a city in Columbia County, Oregon, United States. It was named in 1905 for the owner of the local sawmill. The population was 68 in 2021, with the median age of 60 years and a split of 53% female with 47% male.

== Geography ==
According to the United States Census Bureau, the city has a total area of 0.06 square miles (0.16 km^{2}), all of it land.

== History ==
Implosion of Trojan Nuclear plant cooling tower in 2006

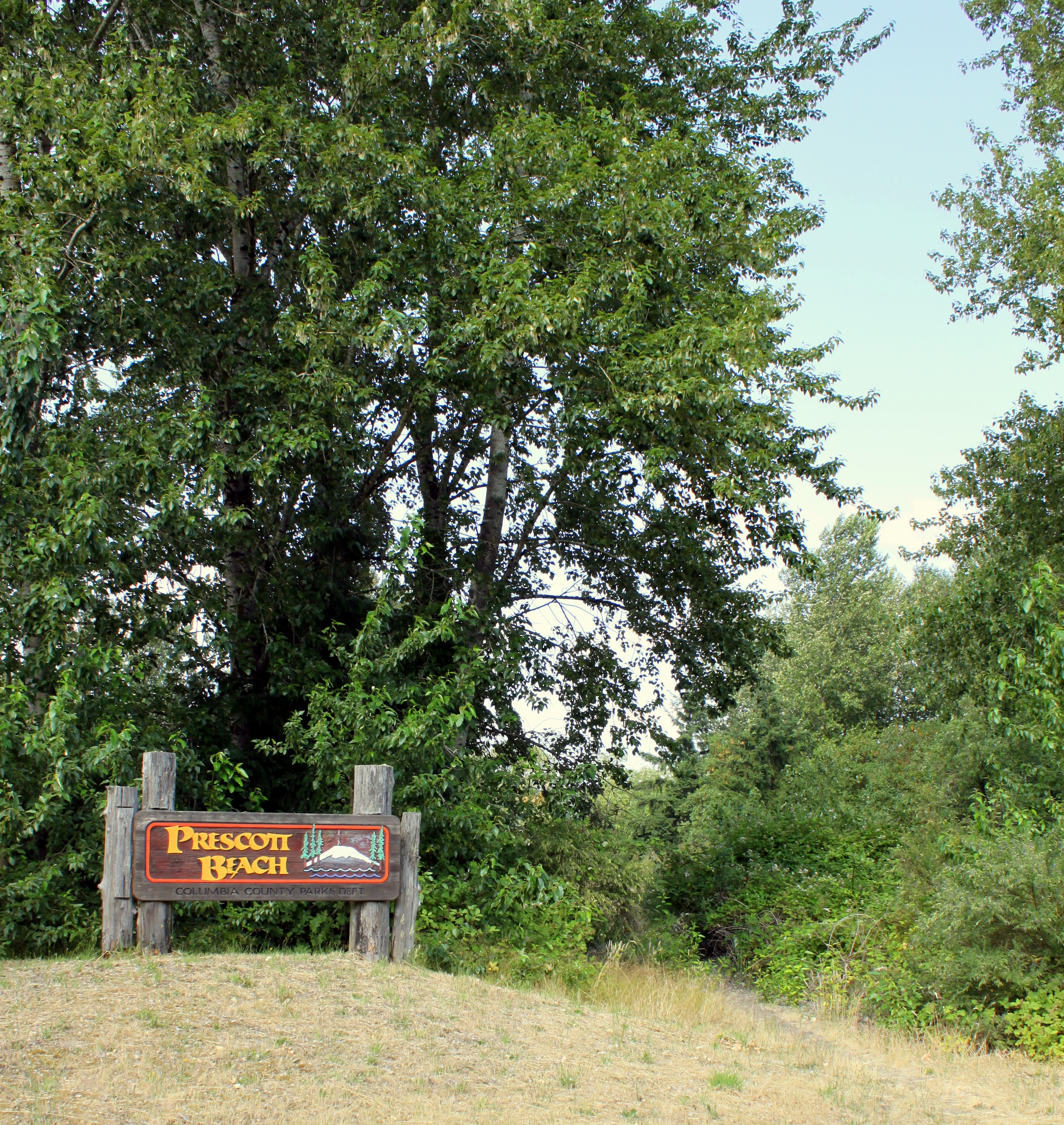
Prescott Beach County Park entrance sign

Although the nearby community of Rainier was better known as the home of the Trojan Nuclear Power Plant, whose cooling tower was imploded in May 2006, the plant was in fact located less than a mile from Prescott. Prescott's origin is that of a mill town associated with a large sawmill that was located on the west end town in an area now called Prescott Beach.

The community was named in 1905 for the owners of the mill. A post office was established on May 21, 1907, and ran until May 15, 1946.

== Demographics ==
Historical population
Census	Pop.	Note	%±
1950	119		—
1960	129		8.4%
1970	105		−18.6%
1980	73		−30.5%
1990	63		−13.7%
2000	72		14.3%
2010	55		−23.6%
2020	82		49.1%
U.S. Decennial Census

=== 2020 census ===
As of the 2020 census, Prescott had a population of 82. The median age was 53.5 years, 17.1% of residents were under the age of 18, and 34.1% of residents were 65 years of age or older. For every 100 females there were 121.6 males, and for every 100 females age 18 and over there were 112.5 males age 18 and over.

0% of residents lived in urban areas, while 100.0% lived in rural areas.

There were 39 households in Prescott, of which 48.7% had children under the age of 18 living in them. Of all households, 43.6% were married-couple households, 23.1% were households with a male householder and no spouse or partner present, and 23.1% were households with a female householder and no spouse or partner present. About 18.0% of all households were made up of individuals and 7.7% had someone living alone who was 65 years of age or older.

There were 39 housing units, of which 0% were vacant. Among occupied housing units, 87.2% were owner-occupied and 12.8% were renter-occupied. The homeowner vacancy rate was <0.1% and the rental vacancy rate was <0.1%.

Racial composition as of the 2020 census
Race	Number	Percent
White	77	93.9%
Black or African American	0	0%
American Indian and Alaska Native	1	1.2%
Asian	0	0%
Native Hawaiian and Other Pacific Islander	1	1.2%
Some other race	0	0%
Two or more races	3	3.7%
Hispanic or Latino (of any race)	2	2.4%

=== 2010 census ===
As of the census of 2010, there were 55 people, 26 households, and 18 families residing in the city. The population density was 916.7 inhabitants per square mile (353.9/km^{2}). There were 31 housing units at an average density of 516.7 per square mile (199.5/km^{2}). The racial makeup of the city was 85% (47 residents) White, 2% (1 resident) African American, 4% (2 residents) Native American, and 9% (5 residents) from two or more races.

There were 26 households, of which 11.5% had children under the age of 18 living with them, 61.5% were married couples living together, 7.7% had a female householder with no husband present, and 30.8% were non-families. 30.8% of all households were made up of individuals, and 3.8% had someone living alone who was 65 years of age or older. The average household size was 2.12 and the average family size was 2.56.

The median age in the city was 51.5 years. 9.1% of residents were under the age of 18; 1.8% were between the ages of 18 and 24; 25.4% were from 25 to 44; 43.6% were from 45 to 64; and 20% were 65 years of age or older. The gender makeup of the city was 54.5% male and 45.5% female.

=== 2000 census ===
As of the census of 2000, there were 72 people, 28 households, and 19 families residing in the city. The population density was 1,200.2 inhabitants per square mile (463.4/km^{2}). There were 33 housing units at an average density of 550.1 per square mile (212.4/km^{2}). The racial makeup of the city was 96% White, 1% Native American, and 3% from two or more races. 24% were of German, 11% Finnish, 11% European, 10% American, 10% Norwegian, 8% Swedish and 5% English ancestry according to Census 2000.

There were 28 households, out of which 25.0% had children under the age of 18 living with them, 50.0% were married couples living together, 10.7% had a female householder with no husband present, and 28.6% were non-families. 21.4% of all households were made up of individuals, and 10.7% had someone living alone who was 65 years of age or older. The average household size was 2.57 and the average family size was 2.95.

In the city, the population was spread out, with 26.4% under the age of 18, 4.2% from 18 to 24, 22.2% from 25 to 44, 20.8% from 45 to 64, and 26.4% who were 65 years of age or older. The median age was 44 years. For every 100 females, there were 105.7 males. For every 100 females age 18 and over, there were 96.3 males.

The median income for a household in the city was $40,000, and the median income for a family was $41,563. Males had a median income of $30,357 versus $28,750 for females. The per capita income for the city was $13,773. There were 13.0% of families and 7.4% of the population living below the poverty line, including 14.3% of under eighteens and none of those over 64.
