= Trojan Nuclear Power Plant =

Nuclear power plant in Oregon, US

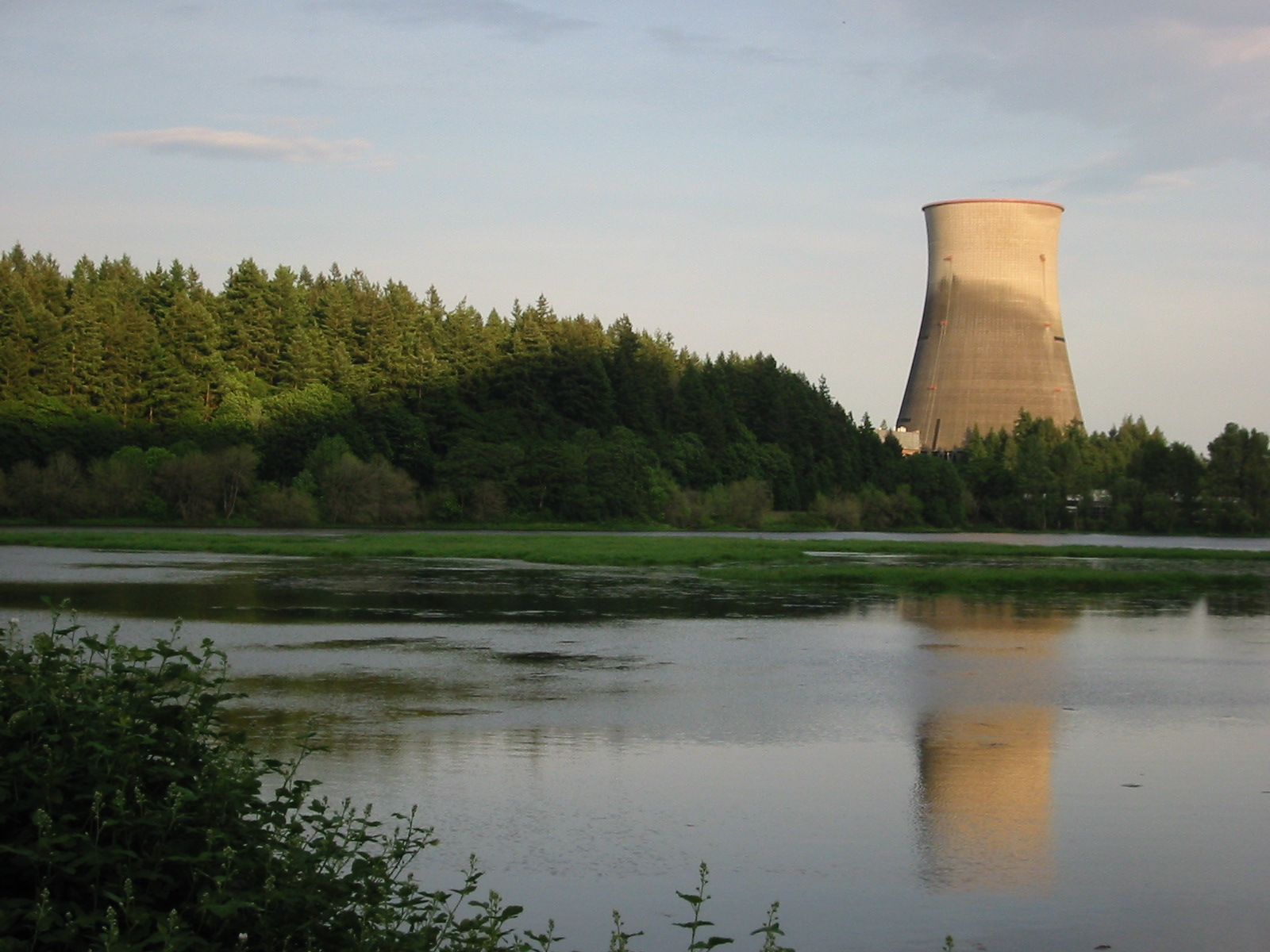
- May 2006, shortly before demolition
- Country: United States
- Location: Columbia County, Oregon, U.S. (near Rainier, Oregon)
- Coordinates: 46°2′18″N 122°53′6″W
- Status: Demolished
- Construction began: 1 February 1970
- Commission date: 20 May 1976
- Decommission date: 9 November 1992
- Construction cost: $460 million ($1.97 billion in 2024)
- Operator: Portland General Electric

Nuclear power station
- Reactor type: PWR
- Reactor supplier: Westinghouse
- Cooling towers: 1 × Natural Draft
- Thermal capacity: 1 × 3411 MW_{th}

Power generation
- Units decommissioned: 1 × 1095 MW
- Capacity factor: 53.6% (lifetime)
- Annual net output: 4,962 GW·h (lifetime average)

External links
- Commons: Related media on Commons

Trojan Nuclear Power Plant was a pressurized water reactor nuclear power plant (Westinghouse reactor vessels) in the northwest United States, located 30 miles north of Portland, Oregon and southeast of Rainier, Oregon. It is thus far the sole commercial nuclear power plant to be built in Oregon. There was public opposition to the plant from the design stage onward. The three main opposition groups were the Trojan Decommissioning Alliance, Forelaws on the Board, and Mothers for Peace. There were largely non-violent protests from 1977, and subsequent arrests of participants.

The plant connected to the grid in December 1975.

After 17 years of service, the plant was closed permanently in 1992 by its operator, Portland General Electric (PGE), after cracks were repeatedly discovered in the steam-generator tubing in the non-radioactive or "safe" side of the plant, and continuing repairs proved too costly. Decommissioning and demolition of the plant began the following year and was mostly completed by 2006.

While operating, the Trojan Nuclear Power Plant represented more than 12% of the electrical generation capacity of the State of Oregon. The site lies about twelve miles (20 km) north of St. Helens, on the westerly bank of the Columbia River.

== History ==
At the site of the Trojan Nuclear Power Plant's eventual construction, the Trojan Powder Company manufactured gunpowder and dynamite on a 634-acre (2.57 km^{2}) parcel. Subsequently, in 1967, Portland General Electric selected the parcel for a new nuclear power plant. Construction began on February 1, 1970; first criticality was achieved on December 15, 1975, and grid connection eight days later on December 23. Commercial operation began on May 20, 1976, under a 35-year license to expire in 2011. At the time, the single 1,130 megawatt unit at Trojan was the world's largest pressurized water reactor; it cost $460 million to build the plant.

Environmental opposition dogged Trojan from its inception, and the opposition included non-violent protests organized by the Trojan Decommissioning Alliance. Direct action protests were held at the plant in 1977 and 1978, resulting in hundreds of arrests.

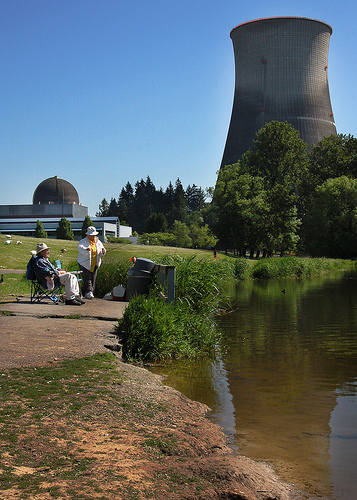
Two people fishing near the Trojan Nuclear Power Plant. The reactor dome is visible on the left, and the massive cooling tower on the right.

In 1978, the plant went offline on March 17 for routine refueling and was idle for nine months while modifications were made to improve its resistance to earthquakes. This followed the discovery of both major building construction errors and the close proximity of a previously unknown fault. The operators sued the builders, and an undisclosed out-of-court settlement was eventually reached.

The Trojan steam generators were designed to last the life of the plant, but it was only four years before premature cracking of the steam tubes was observed. In October 1979, the plant was shut down through the end of the year for repairs. The plant had an extended shutdown in 1984, with difficulty restarting.

In the 1980 election, a ballot measure to ban construction of further nuclear power plants in the state without federally approved waste facilities was approved by the voters 608,412 (53.2%) to 535,049 (46.8%). In 1986, a ballot measure initiated by Lloyd Marbet for immediate closure of the Trojan plant failed 35.7% yes to 64.3% no. This proposal was resubmitted in 1990, and again in 1992 when a similar proposal (by Jerry and Marilyn Wilson) to close the plant was also included. Each measure was soundly defeated by vote margins over 210,000 votes. Although all closure proposals were defeated, the plant operators committed to successively earlier closure dates for the plant.

The demolition of the 499-foot (152 m) cooling tower at 7:00 AM on May 21, 2006.

In 1992, PGE spent $4.5 million to successfully defeat ballot measures seeking to close Trojan immediately, rather than within four years, as PGE had planned. At the time, it was the most expensive ballot measure campaign in Oregon history. A week after the election, the Trojan plant suffered another steam generator tube leak of radioactive water, and was shut down. It was announced that replacement of the steam generators would be necessary. In December 1992, documents were leaked from the U.S. Nuclear Regulatory Commission showing that staff scientists believed that Trojan might be unsafe to operate. In early January 1993, PGE chief plant manager David B. Fancher announced the company would not try to restart Trojan.

=== After 1993 decision not to restart ===
The spent fuel was transferred from cooling pools to 34 concrete and steel storage casks in 2003.

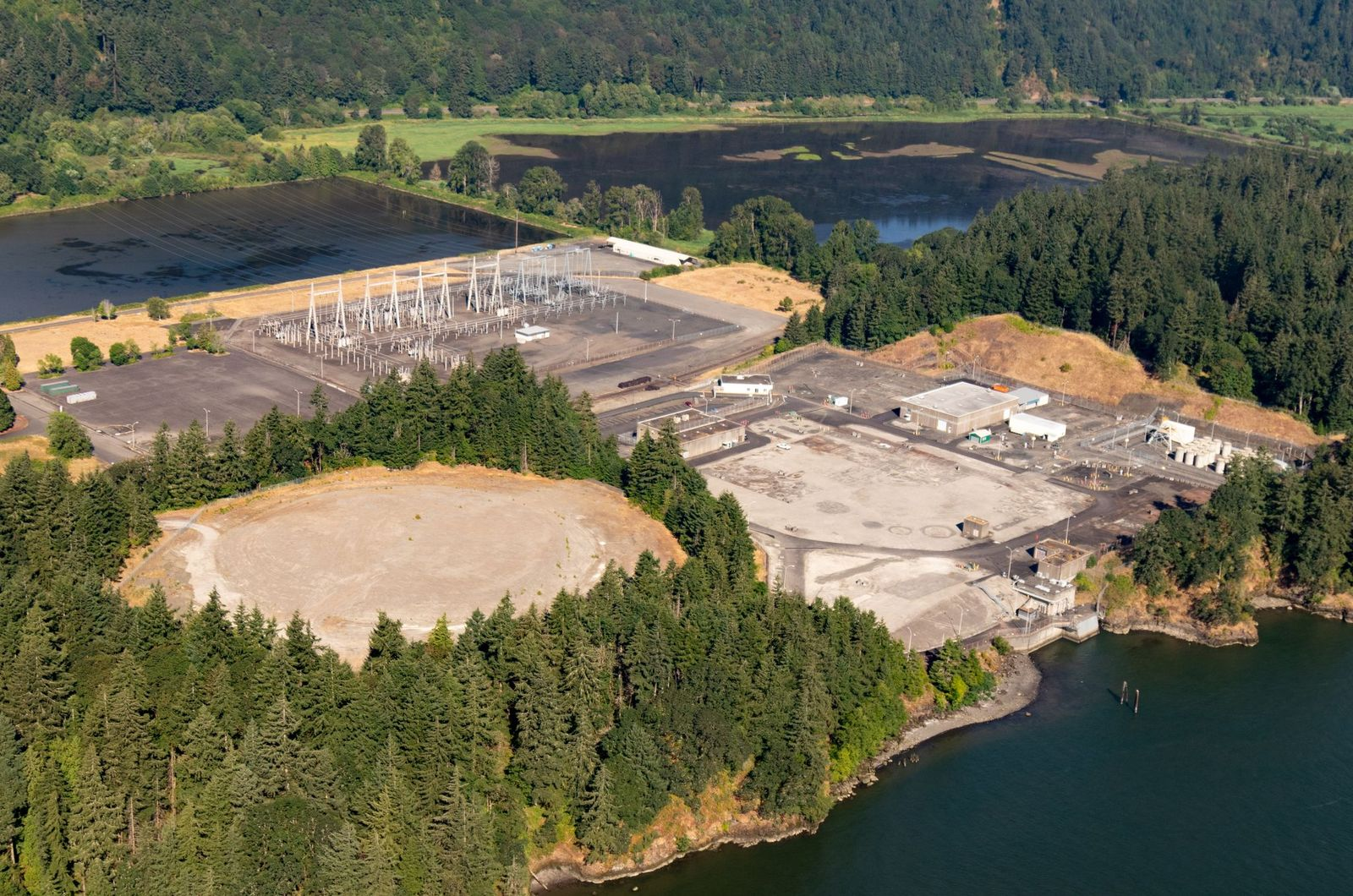
The site in 2022. Site of the water cooling tower is in the foreground.

In 1993 a member of the plant operations staff made and sold coffee mugs with the inscription: Trojan Defueling Team Member and a caption under the logo that said "Will Work For Food". The mugs sold fast and at least a second batch were made.

In 2005, the reactor vessel and other radioactive equipment were removed from the Trojan plant, encased in concrete foam, shrink-wrapped, and transported intact by barge along the Columbia River to Hanford Nuclear Reservation in Washington, where it was buried in a pit and covered with 45 feet (14 m) of gravel, which made it the first commercial reactor to be moved and buried whole. It was awaiting transport to the Yucca Mountain Repository until that project was canceled in 2009.

The iconic 499-foot-tall (152 m) cooling tower, visible from Interstate 5 in Washington and U.S. Route 30 in Oregon, was demolished in 2006 via dynamite implosion at 7:00 a.m. PDT on Sunday, May 21. This event marked the first implosion of a cooling tower at a nuclear plant in the United States. Additional demolition work on the remaining structures continued through 2008. The central office building and the reactor building were demolished by Northwest Demolition and Dismantling in 2008. Remaining are five buildings: two warehouses, a small building on the river side, a guard shack, and offices outside the secured facility. It is expected that demolition of the plant will cost approximately $230 million, which includes the termination of the plant possession-only license, conventional demolition of the building and continuing cost for storage of used nuclear fuel.

A number of the civil defense sirens that were originally installed within a 10-mile (16 km) radius of Trojan, to warn of an incident at the plant that could endanger the general public, continue to stand in the Washington cities of Longview, Kelso, and Kalama. Some of the other sirens, which have been removed, have been repurposed as tsunami warning sirens along the Oregon coast. While there are no plans to remove the remaining sirens, the city of Longview has removed a few of the sirens on an as-needed basis to make way for other projects.

== In popular culture ==
According to behind-the-scenes interviews, for the 1979 film The China Syndrome, producer Michael Douglas and production designer George C. Jenkins toured the Trojan Nuclear Power Plant and were allowed to take extensive photographs of the control room. The film set built at Sunset Gower Studios was largely based on these photographs.
