= Rainier, Oregon =

- City
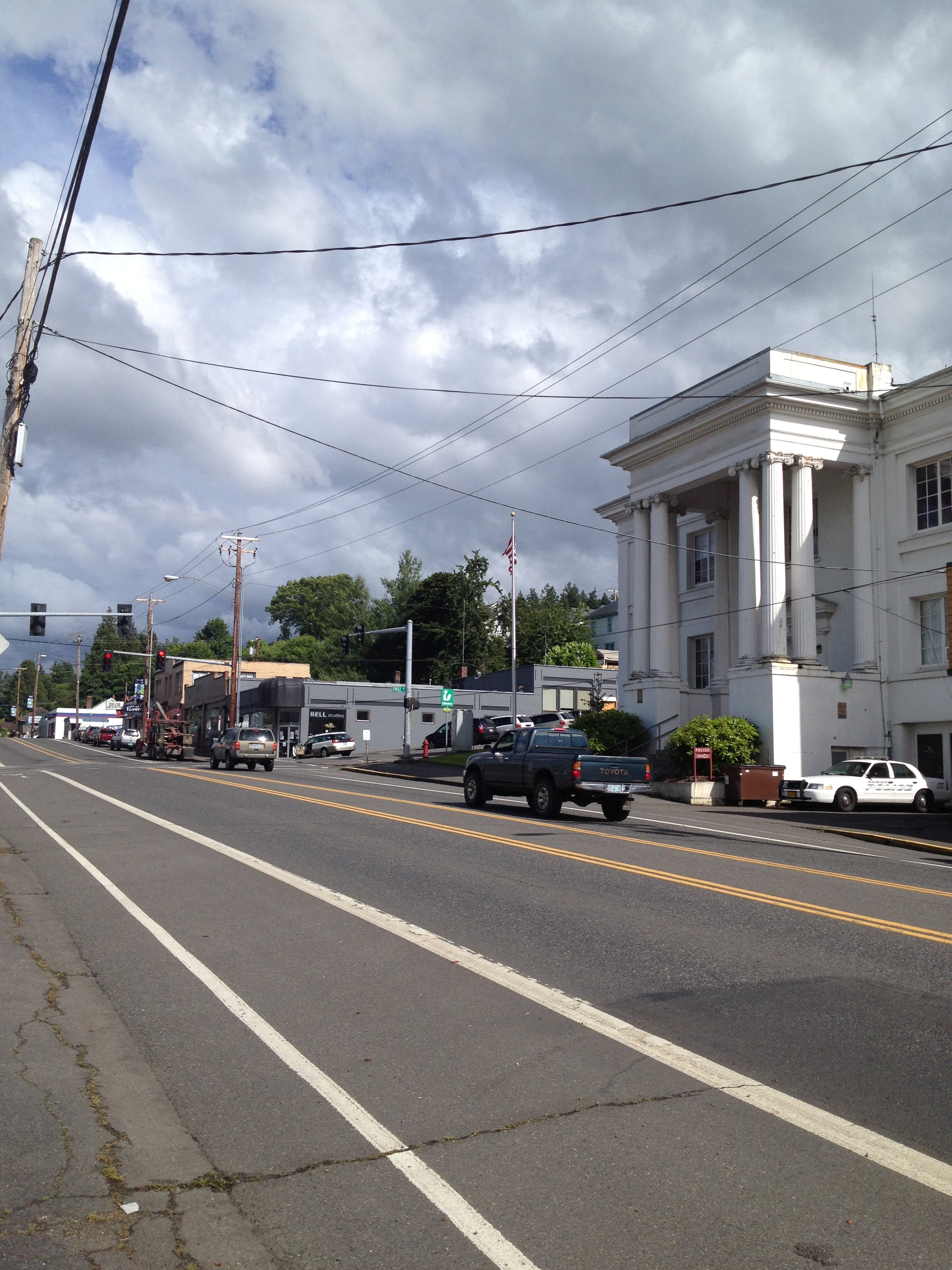

- Location in Oregon
- Coordinates: 46°04′37″N 122°56′26″W
- Country: United States
- State: Oregon
- County: Columbia
- Incorporated: 1885

Government
  - Mayor: Jerry Cole

Area
  - Total: 4.95 sq mi (12.81 km^{2})
  - Land: 4.08 sq mi (10.57 km^{2})
  - Water: 0.86 sq mi (2.24 km^{2})
- Elevation: 177 ft (54 m)

Population (2020)
  - Total: 1,911
  - Density: 468.2/sq mi (180.79/km^{2})
- Time zone: UTC-8 (Pacific)
  - Summer (DST): UTC-7 (Pacific)
- ZIP code: 97048
- Area codes: 503 and 971
- FIPS code: 41-60850
- GNIS feature ID: 2411511
- Website: cityofrainier.com

Rainier (/reɪˈnɪər/ ray-NEER) is a city in Columbia County, Oregon, United States. As of the 2020 census, Rainier had a population of 1,911. Rainier is on the south bank of the Columbia River across from Kelso and Longview, Washington.

== History ==
Implosion of Trojan Nuclear plant cooling tower in 2006

Rainier was founded in 1851 on the south bank of the Columbia River by Charles E. Fox, the town's first postman. First called Eminence, its name was later changed to Fox's Landing and finally to Rainier. The name Rainier was taken from Mount Rainier in Washington, which can be seen from hills above the city. Rainier was incorporated in 1881.

For much of the last quarter of the twentieth century, Rainier was known to the rest of Oregon as home to Trojan Nuclear Power Plant, the only commercial nuclear reactor in the state, which supplied electricity to Portland and its suburbs starting in March 1976. The reactor was closed periodically due to structural problems, and in January 1993, it was decommissioned after cracks developed in the steam tubes. On May 21, 2006, the cooling tower was demolished.

The closing of the Trojan plant precipitated a decline in the number of businesses in the city. While some retail and services are available in the city, currently the only supermarket in the city is a Grocery Outlet. Services are available in neighboring Clatskanie, St. Helens, and in Longview, Washington. Longview is opposite Rainier, across the Columbia River, and connected to Rainier by the Lewis and Clark Bridge.

== Geography ==
According to the United States Census Bureau, the city has a total area of 2.62 square miles (6.79 km^{2}), of which 1.76 square miles (4.56 km^{2}) is land and 0.86 square miles (2.23 km^{2}) is water.

Rainier is surrounded by a number of rural communities. In the past, these places acted as separate communities. Today, most businesses and services have left these rural sites, and the communities are part of a large unincorporated area that receive services out of Rainier. These communities include Fern Hill, Hudson, Alston, Apiary, Goble, and Prescott.

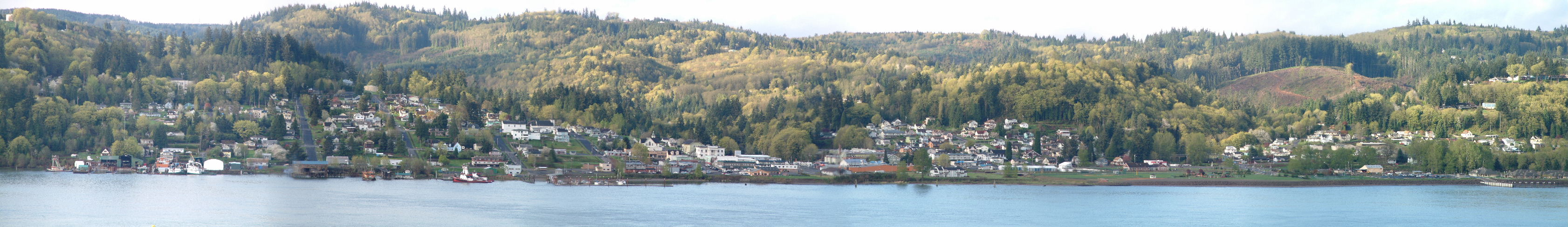
A panorama of Rainier, Oregon, from Longview, Washington. This is a montage of eight separate photographs and can be scrolled.

The Lewis and Clark Bridge spans the Columbia River, linking Rainier to Longview, Washington. It is the only bridge, that spans the entire width of the river, between Portland and Astoria, Oregon.

== Demographics ==
Historical population
Census	Pop.	Note	%±
1890	238		—
1900	522		119.3%
1910	1,359		160.3%
1920	1,287		−5.3%
1930	1,353		5.1%
1940	1,183		−12.6%
1950	1,285		8.6%
1960	1,152		−10.4%
1970	1,731		50.3%
1980	1,655		−4.4%
1990	1,674		1.1%
2000	1,687		0.8%
2010	1,895		12.3%
2020	1,911		0.8%
U.S. Decennial Census

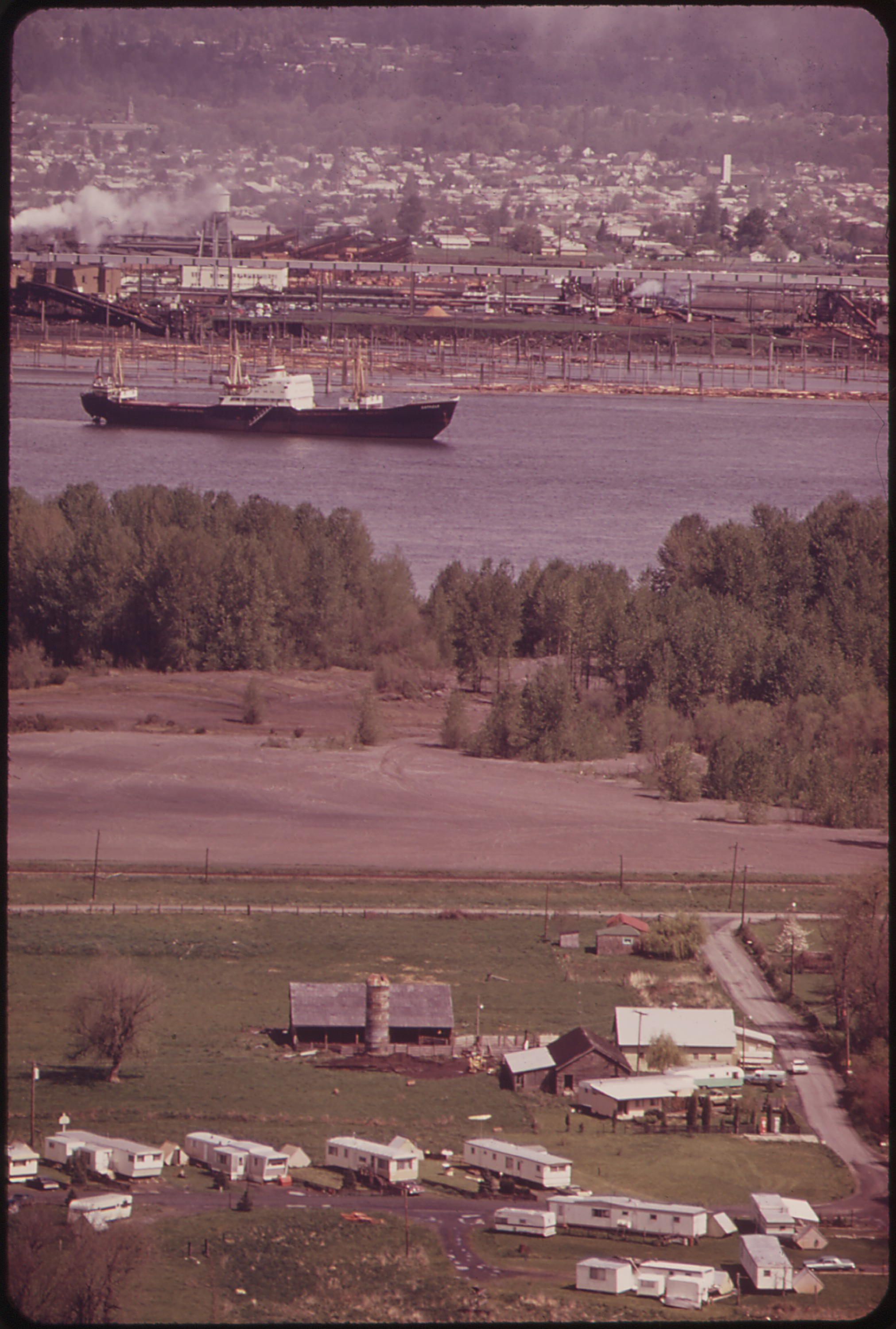
View across the Columbia River in 1973

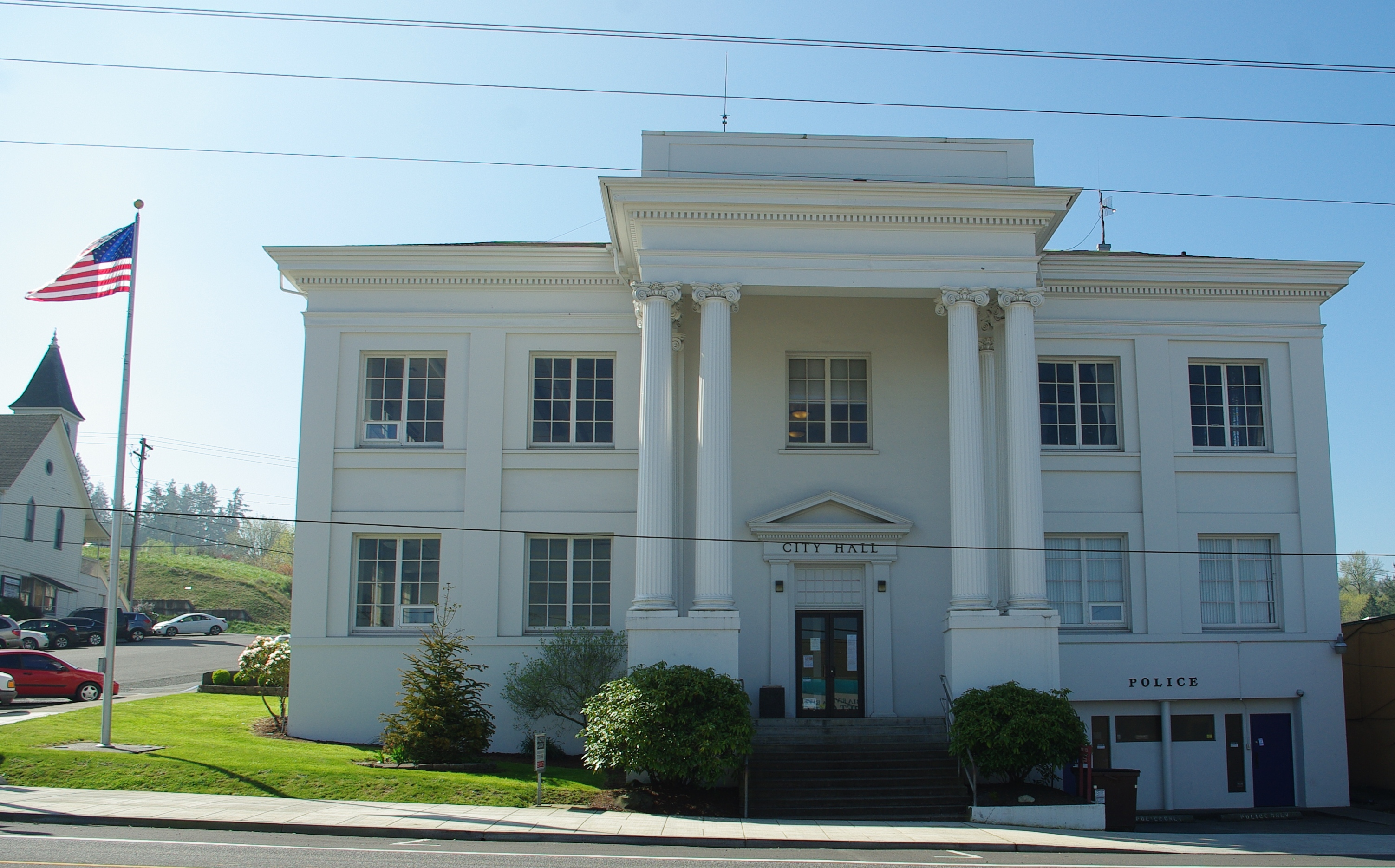
Rainier City Hall

=== 2020 census ===
As of the 2020 census, Rainier had a population of 1,911. The median age was 47.4 years. 18.8% of residents were under the age of 18 and 24.0% of residents were 65 years of age or older. For every 100 females there were 96.0 males, and for every 100 females age 18 and over there were 91.5 males age 18 and over.

98.7% of residents lived in urban areas, while 1.3% lived in rural areas.

There were 824 households in Rainier, of which 24.5% had children under the age of 18 living in them. Of all households, 41.7% were married-couple households, 21.4% were households with a male householder and no spouse or partner present, and 28.9% were households with a female householder and no spouse or partner present. About 31.6% of all households were made up of individuals and 17.0% had someone living alone who was 65 years of age or older.

There were 902 housing units, of which 8.6% were vacant. Among occupied housing units, 65.9% were owner-occupied and 34.1% were renter-occupied. The homeowner vacancy rate was 3.3% and the rental vacancy rate was 3.4%.

Racial composition as of the 2020 census
Race	Number	Percent
White	1,675	87.7%
Black or African American	8	0.4%
American Indian and Alaska Native	42	2.2%
Asian	15	0.8%
Native Hawaiian and Other Pacific Islander	2	0.1%
Some other race	18	0.9%
Two or more races	151	7.9%
Hispanic or Latino (of any race)	84	4.4%

=== 2010 census ===
As of the census of 2010, there were 1,895 people, 818 households, and 502 families living in the city. The population density was 1,076.7 inhabitants per square mile (415.7/km^{2}). There were 884 housing units at an average density of 502.3 per square mile (193.9/km^{2}). The racial makeup of the city was 93.1% White, 0.2% African American, 1.3% Native American, 0.2% Asian, 0.1% Pacific Islander, 1.5% from other races, and 3.6% from two or more races. Hispanic or Latino of any race were 4.0% of the population.

There were 818 households, of which 26.2% had children under the age of 18 living with them, 46.8% were married couples living together, 10.9% had a female householder with no husband present, 3.7% had a male householder with no wife present, and 38.6% were non-families. 32.3% of all households were made up of individuals, and 12.7% had someone living alone who was 65 years of age or older. The average household size was 2.32 and the average family size was 2.91.

The median age in the city was 34.9 years. 21.8% of residents were under the age of 18; 7% were between the ages of 18 and 24; 22.8% were from 25 to 44; 30.4% were from 45 to 64; and 17.9% were 65 years of age or older. The gender makeup of the city was 48.5% male and 51.5% female.

=== 2000 census ===
As of the census of 2000, there were 1,687 people, 667 households, and 460 families living in the city. The population density was 1,044.8 inhabitants per square mile (403.4/km^{2}). There were 733 housing units at an average density of 453.9 per square mile (175.3/km^{2}). The racial makeup of the city was 92.83% White, 0.06% African American, 1.48% Native American, 0.36% Asian, 0.24% Pacific Islander, 1.36% from other races, and 3.68% from two or more races. Hispanic or Latino of any race were 2.85% of the population. 24.1% were of German, 11.3% Irish and 11.0% English ancestry according to Census 2000.

There were 667 households, out of which 31.2% had children under the age of 18 living with them, 55.3% were married couples living together, 10.2% had a female householder with no husband present, and 31.0% were non-families. 26.4% of all households were made up of individuals, and 9.0% had someone living alone who was 65 years of age or older. The average household size was 2.53 and the average family size was 3.03.

In the city, the population was spread out, with 27.0% under the age of 18, 8.1% from 18 to 24, 25.8% from 25 to 44, 26.1% from 45 to 64, and 13.0% who were 65 years of age or older. The median age was 37 years. For every 100 females, there were 90.2 males. For every 100 females age 18 and over, there were 89.8 males.

The median income for a household in the city was $41,949, and the median income for a family was $46,759. Males had a median income of $45,179 versus $23,036 for females. The per capita income for the city was $18,511. About 8.4% of families and 10.4% of the population were below the poverty line, including 16.9% of those under age 18 and 6.4% of those age 65 or over.

== Transportation ==
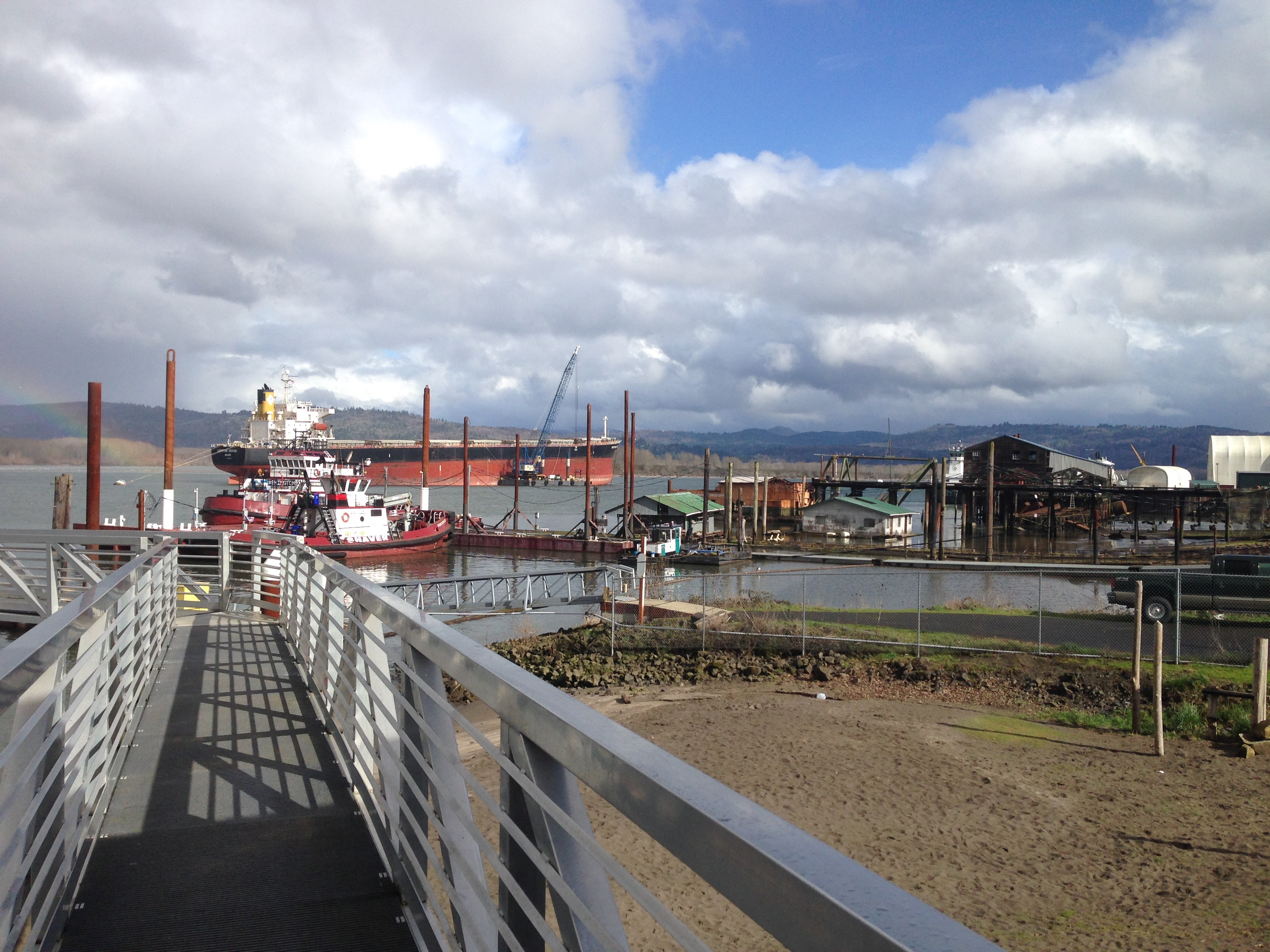
Rainier Marina

=== Railroad ===
The Portland and Western Railroad runs through Rainier. Amtrak passenger rail service is available across the Columbia River in Kelso at the Kelso Multimodal Transportation Center.

=== Ocean shipping ===
In 2005, Teevin Terminal, a barge terminal, opened in Rainier, directly across the Columbia from the Port of Longview in Washington. The Oregon Transportation Commission awarded Teevin Bros. a grant of more than $2 million in 2012 to build a "T-pier," helping Teevin Terminal become "the largest shipper on the Portland & Western line between Eugene and Astoria," according to owner Shawn Teevin.

== Notable people ==
- Miller M. Duris, politician
- Nellie Owens (Little House on the Prairie's Nellie Oleson's archetype), lived here
- Sage Sharp, software engineer
