= Kalama, Washington =

Kalama
- City
- Kalama, Washington
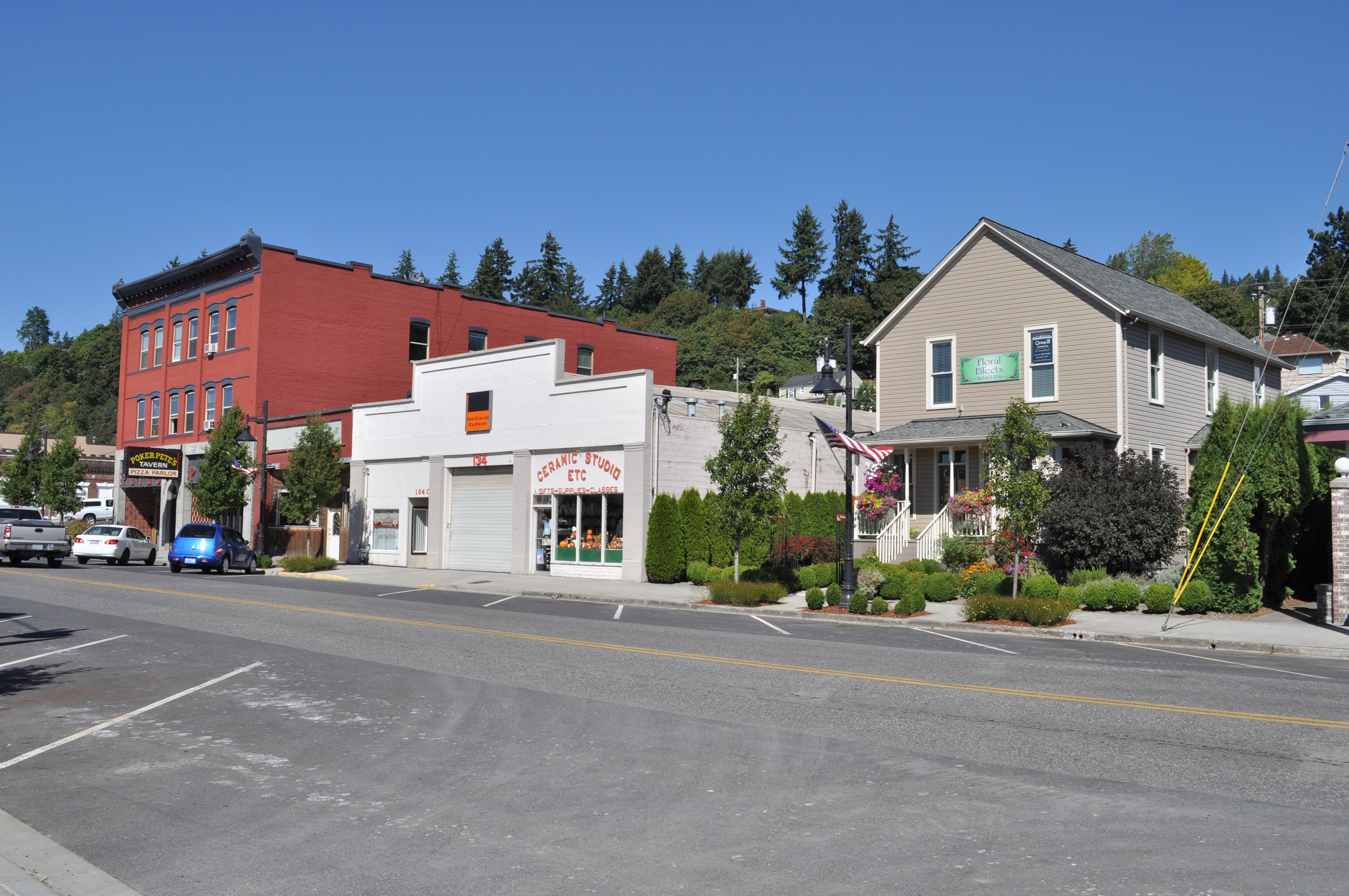
- Downtown Kalama

- Location of Kalama, Washington
- Coordinates: 45°59′51″N 122°50′12″W
- Country: United States
- State: Washington
- County: Cowlitz

Government
  - Type: Mayor–council
  - Mayor: Jon Stanfill

Area
  - Total: 3.83 sq mi (9.91 km^{2})
  - Land: 3.57 sq mi (9.25 km^{2})
  - Water: 0.26 sq mi (0.67 km^{2})
- Elevation: 420 ft (130 m)

Population (2020)
  - Total: 2,959
  - Density: 784/sq mi (302.6/km^{2})
- Time zone: UTC-8 (Pacific (PST))
  - Summer (DST): UTC-7 (PDT)
- ZIP Code: 98625
- Area code: 360, 564
- FIPS code: 53-34645
- GNIS feature ID: 2410160
- Website: cityofkalama.com

Kalama (kə-LAM-ə) is a city in Cowlitz County, Washington, United States. It is part of the Longview, Washington Metropolitan Statistical Area. The population was 2,959 as of the 2020 census.

== Etymology ==
James W. Phillips' Washington State Place Names states, "General John W. Sprague of the Northern Pacific Railroad named the town in 1871 for the Indian word calama, meaning "pretty maiden." There is an additional story: The name "Kalama" was first mentioned in 1806 in the Lewis and Clark Journals ("Cath la haws Creek", "CalamsRiver", and "Calamas") in their reference to what is now known as the Kalama River (this story predates all of the others). Gabriel Franchère, in 1811, wrote of the Indian village at the mouth of the Kalama River, adding that it was called "Thlakalamah" .

Others maintain that the town name is associated with John Kalama (c. 1814 – c. 1870), a carpenter from the Hawaiian island of Maui who came to the Pacific Northwest on a fur-trading vessel in the 1830s as were other Hawaiians coming to mainland America during his time. (The name "Kalama" also originates in the Hawaiian language and means "tree of ebony" or "the torch" i.e. ka lama). John Kalama married a Nisqually tribe woman, Mary Martin, and worked on a farm repairing fish barrels, among other jobs. Mary died early and John remarried; he had a daughter about whom little is known and a son called Peter (1864–1947).

== History ==
Kalama was first settled by Native Americans, particularly members of the Cowlitz Indian Tribes.

The first white settler recorded was in 1853. That first settler was Ezra Meeker and his family. Only one year later, Meeker moved to north Puyallup, Washington, but he sold his Donation Land Claim to a Mr. John Davenport, who, with a few others, permanently settled in the Kalama area. In early 1870, Northern Pacific Railway scouts came to Cowlitz County to find an ideal terminus along the Columbia River. After a failed negotiation for a Donation Land Claim in Martin's Bluff, 4 miles (6.4 km) south of Kalama, Northern Pacific officials purchased 700 acres (280 ha) in Kalama for the terminus of the new railroad as well as a new headquarters. The population swelled with employees of the Northern Pacific Railway. The town also received many Hawaiians who worked under the service of the Hudson's Bay Company and also intermarried with local indigenous peoples like the Nisqually during this time; descendants of such unions still living on Nisqually Reservation to this day.

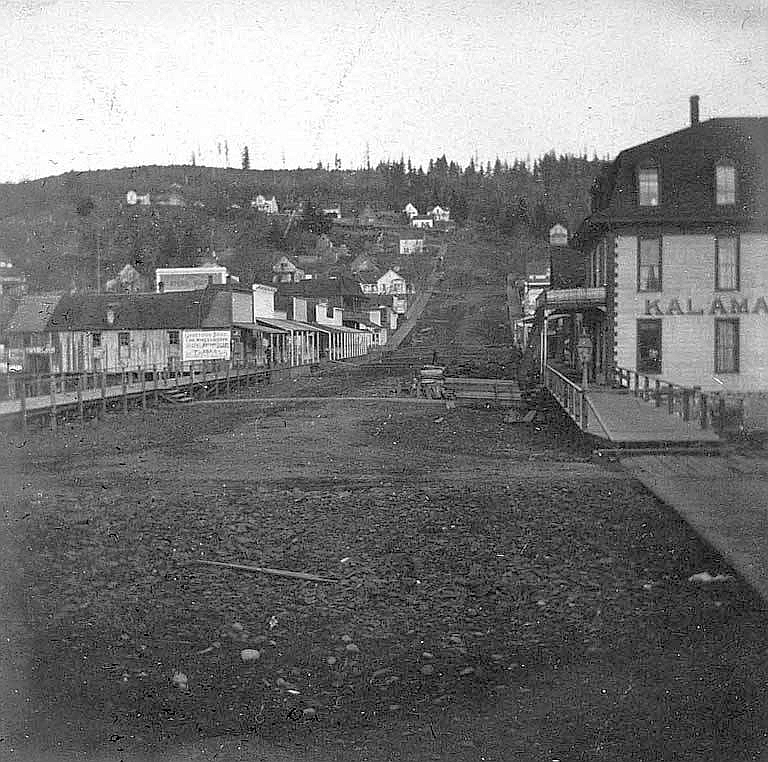
Kalama in 1900

Kalama was entirely a Northern Pacific railroad creation. It was unofficially born in May 1870 when the Northern Pacific railroad turned the first shovel of dirt. Northern Pacific built a dock, a sawmill, a car shop, a roundhouse, a turntable, hotels, a hospital, stores, homes. In just a few months in 1870, the working population skyrocketed to approximately 3,500 and the town had added tents, saloons, a brewery, and a gambling hall. Soon the town had a motto: "Rail Meets Sail". Recruiters went to San Francisco and recruited Chinese labor, who moved to their own Chinatown in a part of Kalama now called China Gardens. The population of Kalama peaked at 5,000 people, but in early 1874, the railroad moved its headquarters to Tacoma, and by 1877, only 700 people remained in Kalama.

Kalama was unofficially incorporated on November 29, 1871. It served as the county seat of Cowlitz County from 1872 to 1922. Kalama was the northern terminus of a railroad ferry operated by the Northern Pacific Railway from Goble, Oregon. This was a critical link in rail service between 1883 when the service began until 1909 when the major rail bridges near Portland across the Columbia and Willamette rivers were completed.

Kalama originated with a stake driven by Gen. John W. Sprague of the Northern Pacific Railway who in March 1870 selected a spot near the mouth of the Kalama river to mark the beginning point of Northern Pacific's Pacific Division. From that stake, the Northern Pacific began building north to Puget Sound, ultimately reaching Commencement Bay at what was to become Tacoma before going bankrupt. Construction began in April 1871 with a crew of 800 men, with the official 'first spike' being driven in May 1871 Scheduled service from Tacoma to Kalama began on January 5, 1874. The Portland-Hunters rail line in Oregon across the Columbia River from Kalama was completed in 1883 by Northern Pacific, about the same time that the ceremonial spike was driven at a site west of Helena, Montana to mark the completion of the transcontinental Northern Pacific Railroad in the fall of 1883. The following year in October 1884, a 3 track, 360-foot (110 m) long railroad ferry, Tacoma, marked the beginning of about 25 years of ferry service across the Columbia River. Hunters was located near the south end of Sandy Island about a mile south of Goble. However the crossing times were excessive when the Tacoma had to work against the tide, and the ferry slip was soon moved to Goble at the north end of Sandy Island and directly across from Kalama. The ferry could handle 12 passenger cars or 27 freight cars.

=== Historic buildings ===
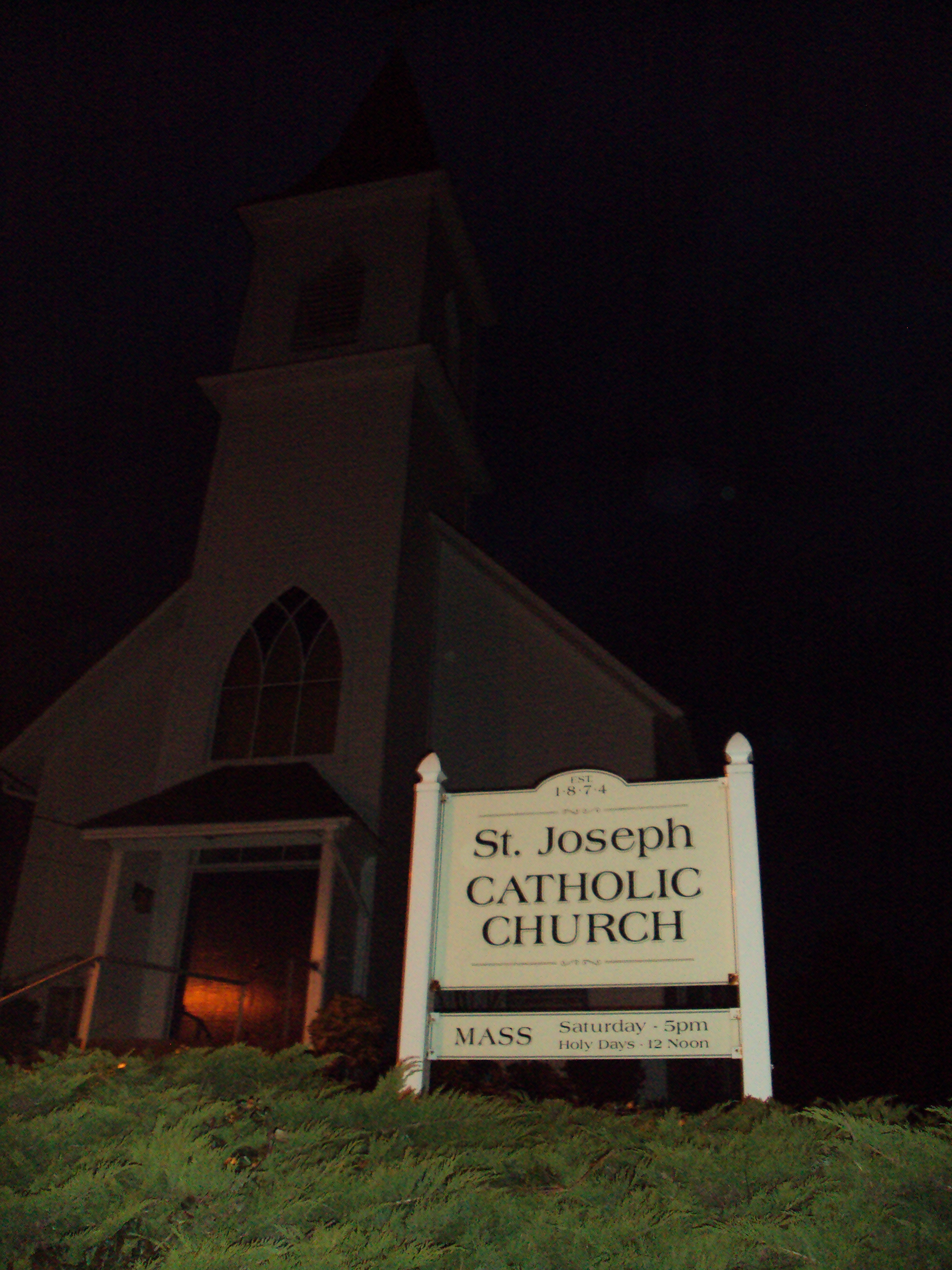
St. Joseph's Catholic Parish, Kalama

St. Joseph's Catholic Parish was built in 1874, around the same time the railroad between Kalama and Tacoma first became operational. This was the first and only Catholic parish in Kalama.

== Geography ==
As the Columbia River exits the Portland Basin, it becomes laterally confined by the Coast Range and Cascade Range foothills before re-expanding downstream into its estuarine reach. Kalama is situated on this narrow floodplain along the east bank of the river, where surrounding terrain constrains development away from the channel.

Located in Southwest Washington, Kalama is the fourth-largest city in Cowlitz County. According to Cowlitz County GIS data, the total incorporated area for the city of Kalama is 3.83 square miles (9.9 km2). The elevation ranges from 2 ft (0.6m) to 1125 ft (343m), with an average elevation of 227 ft (69m). Longview, the largest city in the county, is 10 mi (16 km) to the north. Kalama sits along the Interstate 5 (I-5) corridor between the Seattle metropolitan area, 113 mi (182 km) to the north, and the Portland metropolitan area, 35 mi (56 km) to the south.

Highway access to Kalama is provided by Exit 27, Exit 30, and Exit 32 from I-5. The Port of Kalama and other industrial sites are along the riverfront while the local business district is on the east side of I-5. Residential areas are up the hill to the east and on the cliffs above town, portions of which have dramatic views overlooking the Columbia River. Extensive rail infrastructure is present throughout the town, servicing both freight and passengers. Amtrak Cascades and Coast Starlight lines pass through, both stopping in nearby Longview.

Kalama sits along the final stretch of the Columbia River, after the last major confluence, approximately 75 river miles (121 km) from the Pacific Ocean. Based on the nearest USGS gauge, typical discharge in the Columbia River near Kalama is on the order of hundreds of thousands of cubic feet per second (tens of thousands of cubic meters per second), with seasonal highs in spring and lows in late summer. In 2023, average monthly discharge peaked in May at approximately 408,000 CFS (11,560 m³/s) and declined to about 92,900 CFS (2,630 m³/s) in September, representing a more than fourfold difference between seasonal high and low flows. Discharge in the Columbia River near Kalama is comparable in magnitude to major North American rivers such as the Ohio River and exceeds that of the Yukon River. A small fraction of this flow is contributed by the Kalama River, a 45 mi (72 km) tributary that originates in the Cascade Range just south of Mount St. Helens and joins the Columbia River just outside of Kalama city limits.

The Port of Kalama is a significant maritime terminal on the Columbia River, handling millions of tons of dry bulk cargo annually. Over 100,000 rail cars arrive at the port each year, bringing soybeans, corn, and wheat from Oregon, Washington, Idaho, Montana, North and South Dakota, Nebraska, Minnesota, and Wisconsin for export to international markets. From their terminal at the Port of Kalama, TEMCO LLC loads over 125 oceangoing vessels annually, with their top destinations being China, Southeast Asia, Central America, and the Middle East. By tonnage, the Port of Kalama ranked 37th in the country in 2022, with 50x more exported than imported by weight. The man made Lower Columbia River Channel extends 106.5 mi (171 km) from the Pacific Ocean to Vancouver, passing by and serving the Port of Kalama. It has been incrementally expanded, most recently updated to 600 ft (183m) wide and 43 ft (13m) deep to accommodate modern bulk cargo and container vessels.

=== Climate ===
This region experiences warm (but not hot) and dry summers, with no average monthly temperatures above 71.6 °F (22.0 °C). According to the Köppen Climate Classification system, Kalama has a warm-summer Mediterranean climate, abbreviated "Csb" on climate maps.

== Demographics ==
Historical population
Census	Pop.	Note	%±
1880	129		—
1890	325		151.9%
1900	554		70.5%
1910	816		47.3%
1920	1,228		50.5%
1930	940		−23.5%
1940	1,028		9.4%
1950	1,121		9.0%
1960	1,088		−2.9%
1970	1,106		1.7%
1980	1,216		9.9%
1990	1,210		−0.5%
2000	1,783		47.4%
2010	2,344		31.5%
2020	2,959		26.2%
U.S. Decennial Census; 2020 Census

=== 2020 census ===
As of the 2020 census, Kalama had a population of 2,959. The median age was 41.0 years. 22.6% of residents were under the age of 18 and 19.8% of residents were 65 years of age or older. For every 100 females there were 98.5 males, and for every 100 females age 18 and over there were 97.5 males age 18 and over.

0.0% of residents lived in urban areas, while 100.0% lived in rural areas.

There were 1,198 households in Kalama, of which 31.7% had children under the age of 18 living in them. Of all households, 50.4% were married-couple households, 17.2% were households with a male householder and no spouse or partner present, and 23.2% were households with a female householder and no spouse or partner present. About 23.6% of all households were made up of individuals and 10.3% had someone living alone who was 65 years of age or older.

There were 1,271 housing units, of which 5.7% were vacant. The homeowner vacancy rate was 1.9% and the rental vacancy rate was 4.2%.

Racial composition as of the 2020 census
Race	Number	Percent
White	2,523	85.3%
Black or African American	20	0.7%
American Indian and Alaska Native	31	1.0%
Asian	30	1.0%
Native Hawaiian and Other Pacific Islander	8	0.3%
Some other race	106	3.6%
Two or more races	241	8.1%
Hispanic or Latino (of any race)	237	8.0%

=== 2010 census ===
As of the 2010 census, there were 2,344 people, 967 households, and 665 families residing in the city. The population density was 846.2 inhabitants per square mile (326.7/km^{2}). There were 1,070 housing units at an average density of 386.3 per square mile (149.2/km^{2}). The racial makeup of the city was 91.3% White, 0.6% African American, 1.3% Native American, 1.2% Asian, 0.1% Pacific Islander, 1.8% from other races, and 3.7% from two or more races. Hispanic or Latino of any race were 4.9% of the population.

There were 967 households, of which 31.6% had children under the age of 18 living with them, 52.0% were married couples living together, 11.5% had a female householder with no husband present, 5.3% had a male householder with no wife present, and 31.2% were non-families. 25.4% of all households were made up of individuals, and 10.6% had someone living alone who was 65 years of age or older. The average household size was 2.42 and the average family size was 2.88.

The median age in the city was 41.4 years. 23.5% of residents were under the age of 18; 6.3% were between the ages of 18 and 24; 24% were from 25 to 44; 29.5% were from 45 to 64; and 16.6% were 65 years of age or older. The gender makeup of the city was 48.8% male and 51.2% female.

== Montgomery House Bed and Breakfast ==
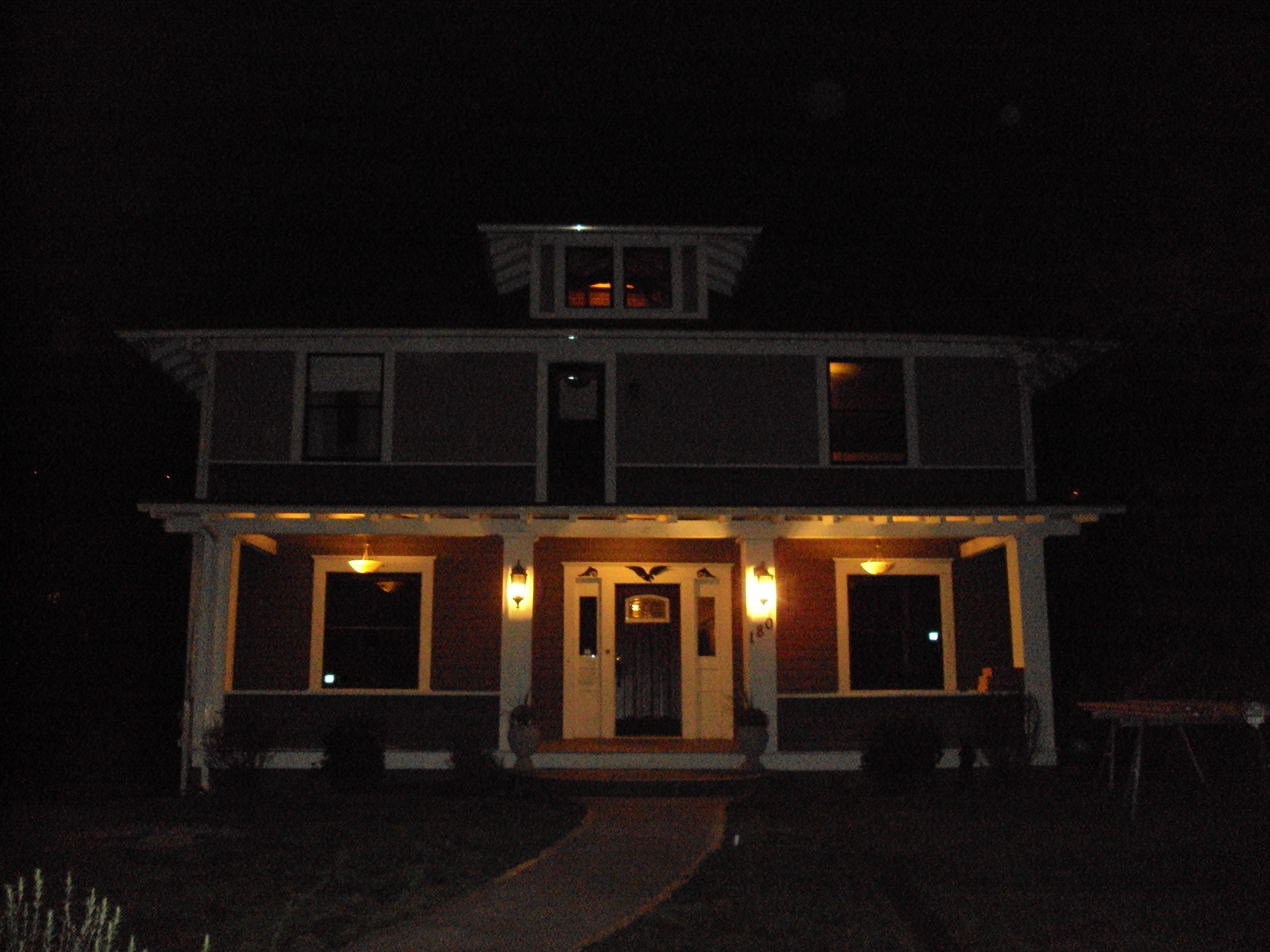
Montgomery House

The Montgomery House Bed and Breakfast is a house built in 1908 on old Cowlitz Indian lands. It was featured in a 2009 feature film documentary Montgomery House: The Perfect Haunting by Danielle Egnew. As of 2013, the house is no longer a bed and breakfast, and is being remodeled.

== Notable people ==
- Jackson Gillis, television writer, was born in Kalama.
- Anna Kashfi the first wife of Marlon Brando, was a long-term resident of Kalama.
- Tucker Wetmore country singer-songwriter was raised in Kalama.

== See also ==
- Kalama Middle/High School
