= List of generating stations in British Columbia =

This is a list of electrical generating stations in British Columbia, Canada.

== Hydroelectric ==
List of most of the hydroelectric generating stations in British Columbia.

Facilities under construction
Planned facilities
Decommissioned facilities

=== Hydroelectric stations owned by BC Hydro ===
A list of all grid-tied hydroelectric generation stations in British Columbia operated by BC Hydro.

Name	Location	Capacity (MW)	Date	Ref
Aberfeldie Dam	49°29′56″N 115°21′2″W	25.0	1953	
Alouette Lake	49°17′10″N 122°29′14″W	9.0	1928	
Ash River	49°22′30″N 125°9′12″W	28.0	1958	
Bridge River	50°43′54″N 122°14′33″W	478.0	1948	
Cheakamus	49°56′4″N 123°17′21″W	158.0	1957	
Clowhom	49°42′41″N 123°32′7″W	33.0	1957	
Elko	49°17′22″N 115°6′15″W	12.0	1924	
Falls River	53°58′59″N 129°44′03″W	7.0	1930	
Gordon M. Shrum (W.A.C. Bennett Dam)	56°0′58″N 122°12′19″W	2,730.0	1968	
John Hart	50°2′35″N 125°18′38″W	138.0	1947	
John Horgan	56°11′41″N 120°54′51″W	1,100	2025	
Jordan River	48°28′37″N 123°59′51″W	170.0	1971	
Kootenay Canal	49°27′10″N 117°30′55″W	583.0	1975	
Ladore	50°0′53″N 125°23′27″W	47.0	1958	
La Joie	50°50′14″N 122°51′29″W	25.0	1957	
Lake Buntzen	49°22′30″N 122°52′07″W	76.8	1951	
Mica	52°4′35″N 118°34′0″W	2,746.0	1976	
Peace Canyon	55°58′57″N 121°59′34″W	694.0	1980	
Puntledge	49°41′15″N 125°2′3″W	24.0	1955	
Revelstoke	51°3′15″N 118°11′40″W	2,480.0	1984	
Ruskin	49°11′43″N 122°24′28″W	105.0	1930	
Seton	50°40′23″N 121°55′27″W	48.0	1956	
Seven Mile	49°1′47″N 117°30′11″W	805.0	1979	
Shuswap	50°17′44″N 118°48′45″W	6.0	1929	
Spillimacheen	50°54′11″N 116°24′33″W	4.0	1955	
Stave Falls	49°13′46″N 122°21′17″W	91.0	1912	
Strathcona	49°59′48″N 125°3′56″W	64.0	1958	
Wahleach	49°15′1″N 121°36′20″W	65.0	1952	
Walter Hardman	50°48′36″N 118°3′53″W	8.0	1960	
Waneta Dam*	49°00′15″N 117°36′43″W	490.0	1952	
Whatshan	49°54′59″N 118°7′0″W	55.0	1972	
Total operating stations (MW)		13,304.8		

*Waneta Dam has been wholly owned by BC Hydro since July 2018 after Fortis BC finalized an agreement with Teck to sell its 66% interest in the dam, but BC Hydro had first rights to purchase the remaining 66% from its first 1/3 ownership deal.

=== Privately-owned hydroelectric stations ===
This list includes all grid-connected hydroelectric generating stations not owned by the Crown Corporation BC Hydro. This list includes stations owned and operated by Independent Power Producers as well as by private utilities such as Nelson Hydro and FortisBC. In some cases, such as Lois Lake and Powell Lake, the electricity generated may be used solely for private industry, even if it is grid-connected.

Name	Location	Capacity (MW)	Date	Owner	Ref
Akolkolex	50°49′21″N 118°01′46″W	10	1995	TransAlta	
Arrow Lakes/Keenleyside Dam	49°20′22″N 117°46′19″W	185	2002	Columbia Power Corporation	
Ashlu Creek	49°54′51″N 123°19′30″W	49.9	2010	Innergex Renewable Energy	
Barr Creek	Tahsis	4.4	2011	Synex International	
Big Silver Creek	49°41′33″N 121°51′37″W	40.6	2016	Innergex Renewable Energy	
Bone Creek	Valemount	19	2011	TransAlta	
Bonnington Falls	Nelson	16	1905	Nelson Hydro	
Boston Bar Hydro (Scuzzy Creek)	49°48′41″N 121°27′30″W	9	1995	Boston Bar LP	
Boulder Creek	50°38′7″N 123°24′12″W	25.3	2017	Innergex Renewable Energy	
Box Canyon	49°33′42″N 123°23′22″W	16	2016	Elemental Energy	
Brandywine Creek	50°03′28″N 123°07′52″W	7.6	2003	Eco Flow Energy	
Brilliant Dam	49°19′29″N 117°37′12″W	145	1944	Columbia Power Corporation	
Brilliant Expansion	49°19′23″N 117°37′11″W	120	2007	Columbia Power Corporation	
Brown Lake	54°01′38″N 129°50′37″W	7.2	1996	Innergex Renewable Energy	
Canoe Creek	Ucluelet	6	2010	Tla-o-qui-aht First Nations	
Castle Creek	McBride	8	2010	Castle Mountain Hydro Ltd.	
China Creek	Port Alberni	6.5	2005	Upnit Power Corporation	
Coats IPP	Gabriola Island	0.5	1985	Crofter's Gleann Enterprises Ltd.	
Corra Linn Dam	49°28′2″N 117°28′0″W	49	1932	FortisBC	
Culliton Creek	49°52′41″N 123°9′38″W	15	2016	BluEarth Renewables	
Cypress Creek	Gold River	2.8	2009	Synex Energy Resources Ltd	
Dasque Creek	Terrace	20	2015	BluEarth Renewables	
Doran Taylor Hydro	Port Alberni	6	1996	Summit Power	
Douglas Creek (Kwalsa Energy)	49°46′3″N 122°9′4″W	27.6	2010	Innergex Renewable Energy	
Eagle Lake Micro Hydro	West Vancouver	0.2	2003	District of West Vancouver	
East Toba	Powell River	147	2010	Innergex Renewable Energy	
East Twin	McBride	1.6	1991	Brookfield Renewable Power	
Eldorado Reservoir	Kelowna	1.1	2009	District of Lake Country	
Fire Creek (Kwalsa Energy)	49°46′59″N 122°14′5″W	25	2010	Innergex Renewable Energy	
Fitzsimmons Creek	Whistler	7.9	2010	Innergex Renewable Energy	
Furry Creek	Furry Creek	10.4	2004	BluEarth Renewables	
Forrest Kerr Generating Station	56°43′30″N 130°40′22″W	195	2014	Coast Mountain Hydro LP	
Haa-ak-suuk Creek Hydro	Ucluelet	6	2010	Tla-o-qui-aht First Nations	
Hauer Creek (aka Tete)	Valemount	2.4	2007	Hauer Creek Power Inc.	
Hunter Creek	Hope	11	2018	Connor, Clark & Lunn	
Hystad Creek	Valemount	6	2002	Brookfield Renewable Power	
Jamie Creek	50°49′42″N 123°3′24″W	22	2014	Boralex	
Jimmie Creek (Upper Toba Valley)	50°34′11″N 124°4′20″W	62	2016	Innergex Renewable Energy	
Kemano Generating Station	53°33′48″N 127°56′32″W	896	1953	Rio Tinto Alcan	
Kokish River	Port McNeil	45	2014	Brookfield Renewable Power	
Kwoiek Creek	50°6′16″N 121°34′25″W	49.9	2013	Innergex Renewable Energy, Kanaka Bar Indian Band	
Lamont Creek (Upper Stave Energy)	49°33′58″N 122°21′1″W	27	2010	Innergex Renewable Energy	
Lois Lake	Powell River	37.4	1930	Brookfield Renewable Power	
Long Lake (Cascade Creek)	Stewart	31	2012?	Regional Power Inc.	
Lorenzetta Creek	Laidlaw	3.2	2016	Zella Hydro	
Lower Bear Creek	Sechelt	10	2011	Regional Power Inc.	
Lower Bonnington	49°27′39″N 117°29′58″W	66	1925	FortisBC	
Lower Clowhom	Sechelt	11	2010	BluEarth Renewables	
Mamquam Hydro	Squamish	58	1996	Atlantic Power Corporation	
Marion 3 Creek	Port Alberni	4.6	2005	Marion Creek Hydro Inc.	
McDonald Ranch	Grasmere	0.1	1993	McDonald Ranch & Timber Co. Ltd.	
McIntosh Creek	McBride	1.2	2014	Snowshoe Power Ltd.	
McLymont Creek	Stewart	66	2015	Northwest Hydro	
McNair Creek Hydro	Port Mellon	9.8	2004	BluEarth Renewables	
Mears Creek	Gold River	3.8	2004	Synex Energy Resources Ltd	
Middle Creek	Terrace	8	2015	BluEarth Renewables	
Miller Creek	Pemberton	29.5	2003	Innergex Renewable Energy	
Montrose Creek	Powell River	88	2010	Innergex Renewable Energy	
Morehead Creek	Williams Lake	0.11	1994	Morehead Valley Hydro	
Northwest Stave River	Mission	17.5	2013	Innergex Renewable Energy	
Pingston Creek	Revelstoke	45	2003	Brookfield Renewable Power, TransAlta	
Powell Lake	Powell River	46	1911	Brookfield Renewable Power	
Ptarmigan Creek	McBride	3.6	1993	Robson Valley Power Corp	
Raging River	Port Alice	8	2002	Raging River Power & Mining Inc.	
Rutherford Creek	Mount Currie	49.9	2004	Innergex Renewable Energy	
Sakwi Creek	Agassiz	6	2014	Connor, Clark & Lunn	
Seaton Creek Hydro (Homestead)	New Denver	0.3	1997	Homestead Hydro Systems	
Sechelt Creek (Salmon Inslet)	Sechelt	16.6	1997	Capstone Infrastructure	
Silversmith	Sandon	0.2	1897	Silversmith Power & Light	
Skookum Creek	Squamish	25	2014	Eco Flow Energy	
Soo River	50°13′34″N 122°54′41″W	13.1	1994	Summit Power	
South Cranberry Creek	Revelstoke	9	2008	Cranberry Creek Hydro LP	
South Slocan	49°27′24″N 117°31′5″W	54	1928	FortisBC	
South Sutton Creek	Port Alberni	6	2005	South Sutton Creek Hydro Inc.	
Stokke Creek (Kwalsa Energy)	49°42′39″N 122°2′3″W	22	2010	Innergex Renewable Energy	
Tipella Creek (Kwalsa Energy)	49°44′27″N 122°9′44″W	18	2010	Innergex Renewable Energy	
Tretheway Creek	Harrison Lake	21.2	2015	Innergex Renewable Energy	
Tyson Creek Hydro	Sechelt	9.3	2009	BluEarth Renewables	
Upper Bear Creek	Sechelt	10	2012	Regional Power Inc.	
Upper Bonnington	49°27′36″N 117°29′1″W	66	1907	FortisBC	
Upper Clowhom	Sechelt	11	2009	BluEarth Renewables	
Upper Lillooet River	Pemberton	81.4	2017	Innergex Renewable Energy	
Upper Mamquam	Squamish	25	2005	TransAlta	
Upper Stave River (Upper Stave Energy)	49°37′22″N 122°26′58″W	33.5	2010	Innergex Renewable Energy	
Volcano Creek	Stewart	18	2015	Northwest Hydro	
Walden North	Lillooet	16	1993	Innergex Renewable Energy	
Waneta Expansion	Trail	335	2015	Waneta Expansion LP	
Winchie Creek	Ucluelet	4.4	2018	Tla-o-qui-aht First Nations	
Woodfibre Dam (Squamish Power Project)	Squamish	1.6	1947	Western Pulp LP	
Zeballos Lake	Zeballos	22	2009	Zeballos Lake Hydro LP	
Bremner - Trio	Harrison Hot Springs	27	2024	Bremner Trio Hydro Corp.	
Narrows Inlet	Sechelt Inlet	33	2019	BluEarth Renewables	
Wedgemount Creek	Whistler	5	2023	Concord Wedgemount Creek GP	
Clemina Creek Hydro	Valemount	10.5		Sorgent.e Hydro Canada	
Serpentine Creek Hydro	Blue River	10.5		Sorgent.e Hydro Canada	
Total operating stations (MW)		3,799.21			

== Other renewables ==
=== Biomass, biogas and waste heat ===
List of all biomass, biogas and waste heat power plants in British Columbia.

Name	Location	Capacity (MW)	Date	Owner	Fuel	Ref
150 Mile House Waste Heat	150 Mile House	6	2008	Capital Power	Waste heat	
Armstrong Wood Waste Co-Gen	Armstrong	20	2001	Riverside Forest Products	Biomass	
Metro Vancouver Waste-to-Energy	Burnaby	25	1988	Metro Vancouver	municipal solid waste	
Cache Creek landfill gas utilization Plant	Cache Creek	5	2015	Wastech Management Services	Biogas	
Cariboo Pulp & Paper	Quesnel	61	2012	West Fraser Timber	Biomass	
Celgar Green Energy	Castlegar	48	2010	Mercer Celgar LP	Biomass	
Chetwynd Biomass	Chetwynd	12	2015	West Fraser Timber	Biomass	
Conifex Green Energy	Mackenzie	36	2015	Conifex Power LP	Biomass	
Crowsnest Pass	Sparwood	11	2013	Enfinite BC LP	Waste Heat	
Fort St. James Green Energy	Fort St. James	40	2017	BioNorth Energy LP	Biomass	
Fraser Lake Biomass	Fraser Lake	12	2014	West Fraser Timber	Biomass	
Greater Nanaimo PCC Cogeneration	Nanaimo	0.335	2019	Regional District of Nanaimo	Biogas	
Harmac Biomass	Nanaimo	55	2014	Nanaimo Forest Products Ltd.	Biomass	
Howe Sound Green Energy	Port Mellon	112	2010	Howe Sound Pulp and Paper Corporation	Biomass	
Intercon Green Power	Prince George	31.7	2004?	Canfor	Biomass	
Kamloops Green Energy	Kamloops	76		Kruger Kamloops Pulp LP	Biomass	
LP Golden Biomass	Golden	7.5		Louisiana-Pacific Canada Ltd.	Biomass	
Merritt Green Energy	Merritt	40	2018	Nicola Clean Power Ltd.	Biomass	
Nanaimo Reservoir No. 1 Energy Recovery	Nanaimo	0.3	2014	City of Nanaimo	Waste kinetic energy	
Northwood Green Power	Prince George	95		Canfor	Biomass	
PGP Bio Energy Project	Prince George	60		Canfor	Biomass	
Savona ERG	Savona	6	2008	EnPower	Waste heat	
Skookumchuk Power	Skookumchuk	51		Skookumchuck Pulp	Biomass	
Vancouver Landfill Project	Delta	7.4	2003	Maxim Power	Biomass	
Williams Lake Power Plant	Williams Lake	68	1993	Atlantic Power Corporation	Biomass	
Cedar Road LFG Inc. (Ceased operations in 2020)	Nanaimo	1.4	2009	Cedar Road LFG Inc.	Biogas	
Fraser Richmond Soil and Fibre (closed in 2019)	Richmond	1.03	2012	Harvest Power	Biomass	
Hartland Landfill Project (closed in 2023)	Victoria	1.6	2004	Maxim Power	Biomass	
Powell River Generation (closed in 2021)	Powell River	48	2015	Catalyst Paper Corporation	Biomass	
Tolko Kelowna Cogeneration (closed in 2020)	Kelowna	14.9	2007	Tolko Industries	Biomass	
Total operating stations (MW)		886.234				

=== Solar photovoltaic ===
List of all grid-connected solar photovoltaic power stations in British Columbia.

Name	Location	Capacity (MW)	Date	Owner	Ref
SunMine	Kimberley	1.0	2015	City of Kimberley	
Tsilhqot'in Solar Farm	Hanceville	0.99	2020	Tsilhqot’in Nation	
quA-ymn Solar	Logan Lake	15	2025	quA-ymn Solar LP	
m.ah a temEEwuh Solar	Logan Lake	104		Logan BC Solar Project LP	
ONA UNB Solar	Nicola Lake	15		Upper Nicola Band and Okanagan Nation Alliance	
Total operating stations (MW)		16.99			

=== Wind ===
List of all wind farms in British Columbia.

Name	Location	Capacity (MW)	Date	Owner	Ref
Bear Mountain Wind Park	Dawson Creek	102	2009	AltaGas	
Cape Scott Wind Farm	Port Hardy	99	2013	GDF-Suez	
Dokie Wind	Chetwynd	144	2011	Dokie General Partnership	
Eye of the Wind	49°22′15″N 123°5′56″W	1.5	2010	Grouse Mountain	
Meikle Wind Farm	Tumbler Ridge	185	2017	Pattern Energy/PSP Investments	
Pennask Wind Farm	49°55′26″N 120°6′14″W	15	2017	Okanagan Wind	
Quality Wind Project	Tumbler Ridge	142	2012	Capital Power Corporation	
Shinish Creek Wind Farm	49°39′39″N 120°8′13″W	15	2017	Okanagan Wind	
Moose Lake Wind Project	Tumbler Ridge	15	2019	Boralex	
Sukunka Wind Energy Project	Chetwynd	15	2021	Sukunka Wind Project LP	
Zonnebeke Wind Energy Project	Chetwynd	15	2021	Zonnebeke Wind Project LP	
Yǝyus Energy Project	Campbell River	197.2		Yǝyus Energy Inc.	
Stewart Creek Wind Project	Fort St. John	200		Stewart Creek Power Inc / Innergex Renewable Energy Inc.	
Ni Ti Mountain Wind Project	Fraser Lake	200		Nithi Mountain Power GP	
K2 Wind Project	Kelowna	160		K2 Wind Power Inc	
Highland Valley Wind Project	Logan Lake	197.2		Highland Valley Wind Inc	
Mount Mabel Wind Project	Logan Lake	142.8		Mount Mabel Wind Inc	
Boulder-Elkhart Wind Project	Merritt	94		Elkhart Wind LP	
Nilhts'I Ecoener Project	Prince George	140		Nilhts'I Ecoener Energy Corp	
Taylor Wind	Taylor	200		Taylor Wind Project Inc	
Total operating stations (MW)		748.5			

== Grid energy storage ==
Grid energy storage, is a set of technologies connected to the electrical power grid that store energy for later use.

=== Grid-Scale Batteries ===
List of all Grid-Scale Batteries in British Columbia.

Name	Location	Capacity (MW)	Duration (hours)	Date	Owner	Ref
Vancouver Island Grid-Scale Battery Energy Storage System	48.82975°N 123.716054°W	100	4	2030	BC Hydro	
Total operating stations (MW)		0				

== Natural gas ==
List of all natural gas power plants in British Columbia.

Name	Location	Capacity (MW)	Date	Owner	Ref
Fort Nelson Generating Station	58°43′26″N 122°42′4″W	73.0	1999	BC Hydro	
Houweling Nurseries Cogeneration	Delta	8.8	2014	Houweling's Tomatoes	
Island Generating Station	Campbell River	275	2002	Capital Power Corporation	
McMahon Cogeneration Plant	Taylor	105	1993	Heartland Generation	
Prince Rupert Generating Station	54°17′0″N 130°18′25″W	46.0	1975	BC Hydro	
Burrard Generating Station (decommissioned in 2016)	49°17′56″N 122°53′25″W	950	1961	BC Hydro	
Total operating stations (MW)		507.8			

== Off-grid ==
List of all power plants in British Columbia serving loads in communities not connected to the Western Interconnection power grid.

Name	Location	Capacity (MW)	Date	Owner	Type	Ref
Ah-Sin-Heek	52°21′35″N 126°42′45″W	7.3		BC Hydro	Diesel	
Anahim Lake	52°28′0″N 125°19′0″W	3.9		BC Hydro	Diesel	
Atlin	59°34′28″N 133°41′57″W	2.7		BC Hydro	Diesel	
Bella Bella	52°09′52″N 128°8′42″W	4.9		BC Hydro	Diesel	
Clayton Falls	52°22′13″N 126°48′51″W	2.0		BC Hydro	Hydroelectric	
Dease Lake	58°26′20″N 130°0′50″W	3.5		BC Hydro	Diesel	
Eddontenajon	57°46′18″N 129°58′46″W	1.7		BC Hydro	Diesel	
Elhlateese	49°01′14″N 125°02′06″W	0.2	2012	BC Hydro	Diesel	
Good Hope Lake	59°16′55″N 129°18′10″W	0.8	2015	BC Hydro	Diesel	
Hartley Bay	53°25′30″N 129°15′07″W	1.1		BC Hydro	Diesel	
Hluey Lakes	Dease Lake	3	1999	Capstone Infrastructure	Hydro	
Kwadacha	57°25′26″N 125°37′55″W	1.8		BC Hydro	Diesel	
Kwadacha Bioenergy Project	57°25′26″N 125°37′55″W	0.5		Kwadacha Nation	Biogas	
Malibu Hydro	Malibu	0.6	2005	Malibu Club	Hydro	
Masset	54°1′13″N 132°6′48″W	16.5		BC Hydro	Diesel	
McBride	53°18′23″N 120°10′02″W	5.0	2010	BC Hydro	Biodiesel	
Moresby Lake Generating Station	Haida Gwaii	6.6	1990	Atlantic Power Corporation	Hydro	
Ocean Falls	Ocean Falls	14	1922	Boralex	Hydro	
Pine Creek	Atlin	2.1	2009	Taku River Tlingit First Nation	Hydro	
Sandspit	53°14′8″N 131°52′46″W	10.2		BC Hydro	Diesel	
Takla	55°29′00″N 125°58′25″W	0.7		BC Hydro	Diesel	
Telegraph Creek	57°54′14″N 131°10′18″W	1.8		BC Hydro	Diesel	
Tsay Keh Dene	56°46′37″N 124°56′32″W	1.1		BC Hydro	Diesel	
Toad River	58°50′44″N 125°13′22″W	0.6	2009	BC Hydro	Diesel	
Haida Solar North	Masset	2.0	2025	Tll Yahda Energy LP	Solar	
Ulkatcho Solar Farm	Anahim Lake	4.0		Ulkatcho Energy Corporation	Solar	
Gabion River EPA	Hartley Bay	0.95		Gitga'at Economic Partnership	Hydro	
Total operating stations (MW)		94.6				

== See also ==
- BC Hydro
- Columbia Power Corporation
- FortisBC
- Energy in Canada
- Independent power producers in British Columbia
- List of electrical generating stations in Canada
