= Kootenay Canal =

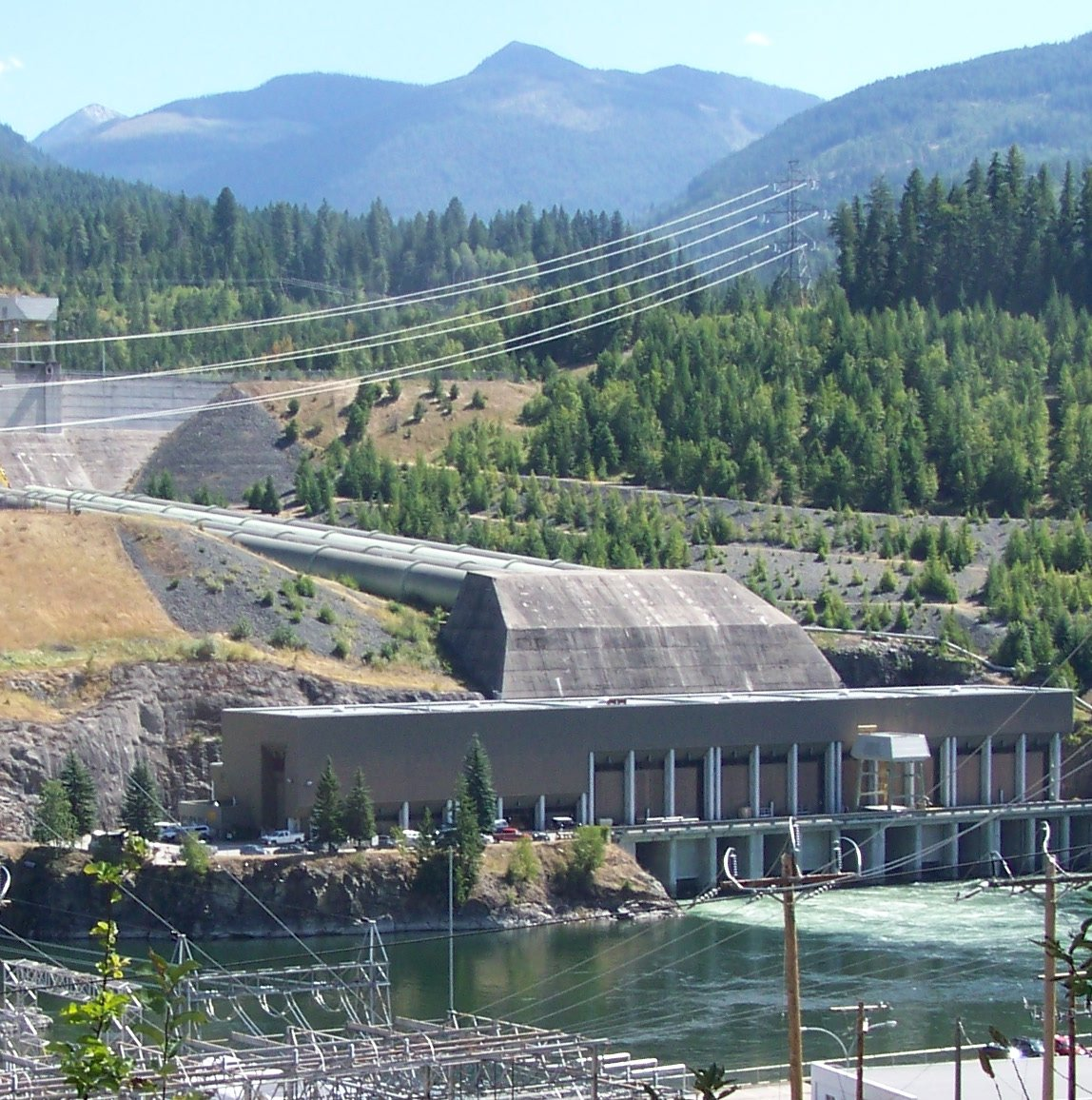

- Location within British Columbia
- Official name: Kootenay Canal Generating Station
- Location: Kootenays, British Columbia, Canada
- Coordinates: 49°27′10″N 117°31′05″W
- Opening date: 1976

Reservoir
- Creates: Kootenay Lake
- Surface area: 38,900 ha (389 km^{2})

Power Station
- Operator: BC Hydro
- Hydraulic head: 84m
- Turbines: 4
- Installed capacity: 588 MW
- Capacity factor: 48.2%
- Annual generation: 2482 GWh

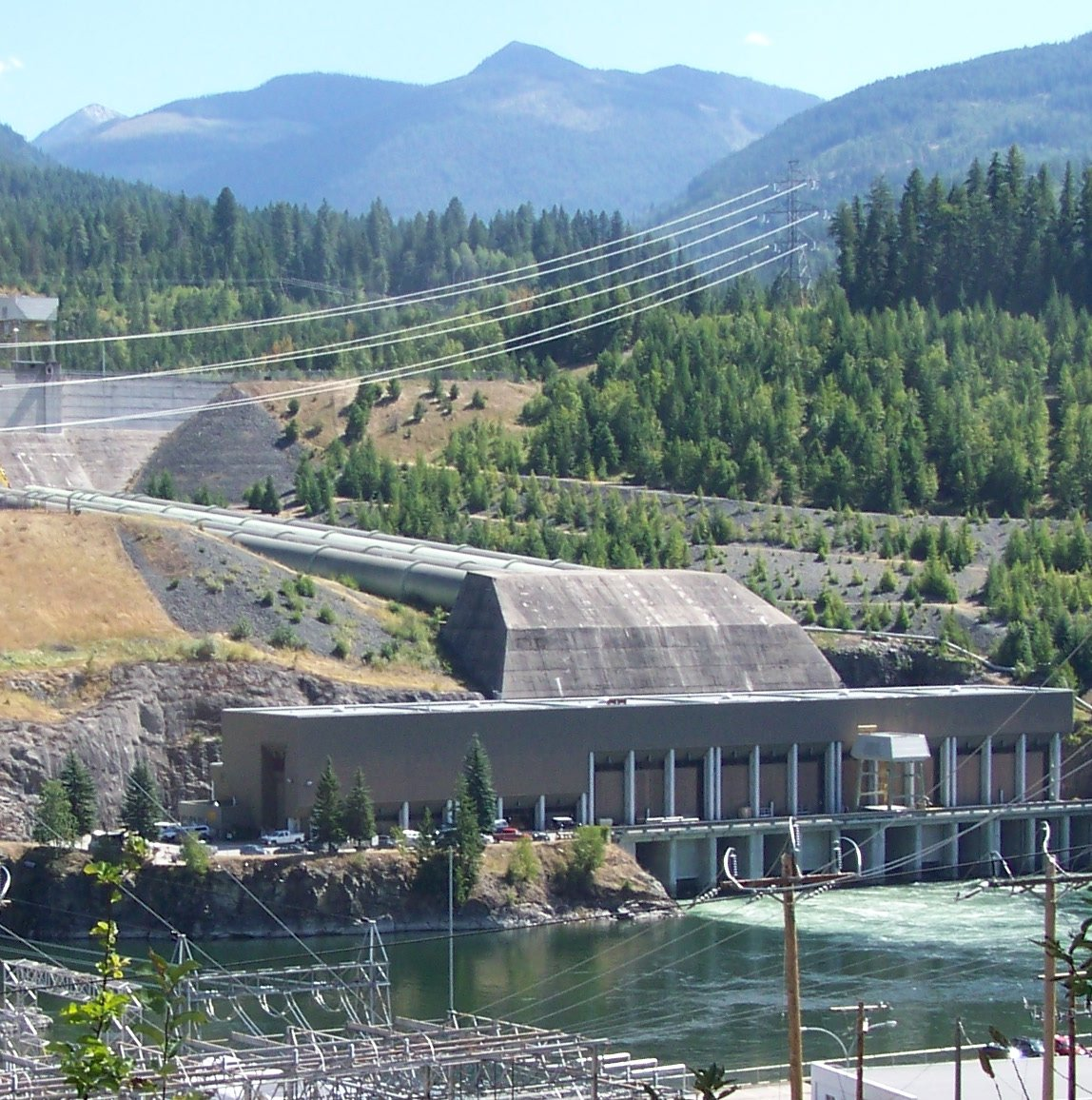
Kootenay Canal powerhouse

The Kootenay Canal is a hydroelectric power station, located 19 km downstream of Nelson, British Columbia, Canada. Where the Kootenay River flows out of the reservoir formed by the Corra Linn Dam on Kootenay Lake, a canal diverts water to BC Hydro's Kootenay Canal Generating Station. Its construction was a result of the Duncan Dam and Libby Dam providing year round flows into Kootenay Lake. The powerhouse was completed in 1976.

== Diversion ==
Water enters the canal from the Corra Linn headpond and for much of the year is diverted 4.5 km past Corra Linn Dam, City of Nelson Powerhouse, Upper Bonnington, Lower Bonnington and South Slocan. By diverting water past the older and smaller dams Kootenay Canal can generate more power due to greater head and more modern generators.

== Powerhouse ==
After passing through the canal and dropping 84 meters through the powerhouse containing four water turbine-electrical generator units, water then returns to the river. Power generated at Kootenay Canal plant is fed into BC Hydro's provincial grid via two lines running south to Selkirk Switching Station, near the Seven Mile Generating Station.

== Expansion ==
In 1999 the four turbines were upgraded and increased the output to a total of 583 MW. Kootenay Canal and Seven Mile generating stations together supplied 10% of BC Hydro's electricity requirements.

== Canal plant agreement ==
Under the terms of the Columbia River Treaty, the Province of British Columbia is entitled to downstream benefits resulting from dam construction. Both the Duncan Dam above Kootenay lake and Lake Koocanusa created by the Libby Dam 200 kilometers upstream in Montana, are covered by the treaty and result in a constant supply of water into Kootenay Lake, and to the many Columbia River dams downstream. BC Hydro is allowed to divert water from five older hydroelectric plants owned by FortisBC and the City of Nelson. Fortis receives the amount of power their generating stations would have produced. Downstream the Brilliant Dam is in the agreement. On the Pend d'Oreille River the Seven Mile Dam and the Waneta Dam are also in the agreement.

== See also ==
- Hydroelectric dams on the Columbia River
- List of generating stations in British Columbia
