= Waneta Dam Expansion =

- Coordinates: 49.0041°N 117.6116°W
- Opening date: 2015.
- Operator(s): FortisBC (Operator), Columbia Power Corporation (Owner), Columbia Basin Trust (Owner)

Dam and spillways
- Impounds: Pend d'Oreille
- Height: 76 metres (249 ft)

Power Station
- Installed capacity: 335 MW
- Annual generation: 627.35 GWh

Waneta Dam Expansion is a two-unit powerplant which started construction in winter of 2010/11 just downstream of the existing Waneta Dam on the Pend d'Oreille River. The dam generates power from water that would otherwise be spilled from the existing project, and is delivered to the BC Hydro grid via a separate 10 km long 230kV transmission line. The expansion project is a partnership, with Fortis Inc. holding a 51% share in the project and the two Crown agencies Columbia Power Corporation and Columbia Basin Trust holding a 32.5% and 16.5% share, respectively. SNC-Lavalin designed and built the project. In January 2019, Columbia Power and Columbia Basin Trust announced that they had agreed to purchase Fortis Inc.’s 51% interest in the facility. The purchase was concluded in April 2019.

The project started delivering power to the grid in 2015 via its two Francis turbine-generator units

== See also ==
- List of dams in the Columbia River watershed
- List of generating stations in BC
