= Corra Linn Dam =

Dam in British Columbia, Canada

Coordinates: 49°28′N 117°28′W

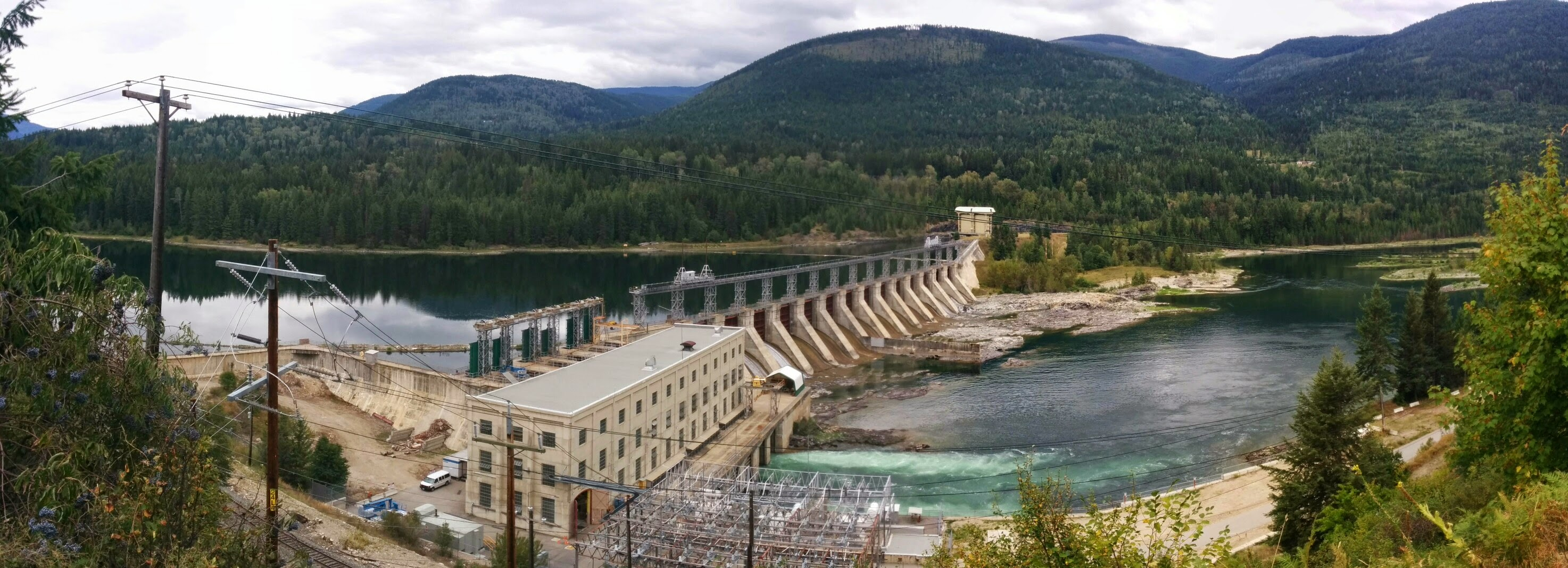
- View of Corra Linn Dam, 2014.
- Opening date: 1932
- Operator(s): FortisBC

Dam and spillways
- Impounds: Kootenay River
- Height: 16m

Reservoir
- Creates: Kootenay Lake

Corra Linn Dam is a concrete hydroelectric dam on the Kootenay River between the cities of Castlegar and Nelson, in the West Kootenay region of southern British Columbia.

== Rapids ==
The Corra Linn Rapids, named after the Falls of Clyde upper falls of Cora Linn, preceded the dam at this location.

== Neighbourhood ==
The adjacent former train station and neighbourhood were named after the rapids, but the locality has been frequently misspelled as Corra Lynn.

== Dam ==
For the six-year period after the 1932 opening, the dam was not permitted to raise the level of Kootenay Lake. It operated as a run-of-the-river hydroelectricity plant allowing the spring freshet to pass downstream. After devastating floods to Idaho farmlands in 1938, the International Joint Commission granted two approvals.

The first allowed excavation to the outlet of the lake at Grohman Narrows. In 1939, 255,809 cubic metres (334,585 cu yd) of gravel and 13,706 cubic metres (17,927 cu yd) of rock were removed, which included rock bluffs on the south side of the river. The narrows was made deeper and wider, allowing for a greater drawdown of the lake during the winter and a greater flow during spring freshet. Even after excavation, Grohman Narrows continued to limit outflow. During the 1961 flood, the level of the lake was 3 metres (10 ft) above the maximum level of the dam, owing to water held back at the narrows. Models indicate the lake would have been almost 2 metres (7 ft) higher without the excavation. Between 2005 and 2010 BC Hydro considered more excavation at the narrows as a potential "Resource Smart" project.

The second approval permitted the dam to be used to raise the level of Kootenay Lake by 2 metres, thus forming a reservoir for flood control and hydro power.

The dam's powerplant has a generating capacity of 51 MW. In 2003, FortisBC bought the dam formerly owned by West Kootenay Power.

== Successive dams ==
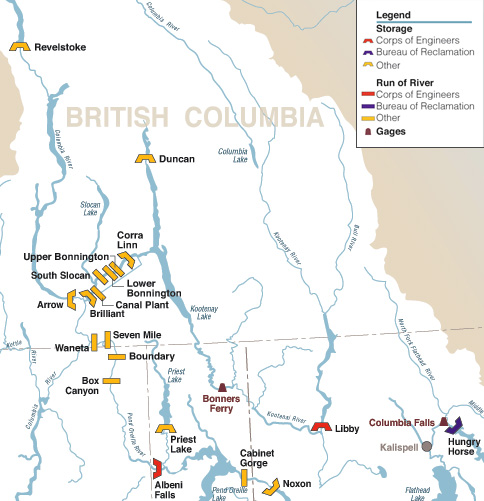
Map highlighting major dams and reservoirs in the Kootenay River watershed and surrounds

After the 1948 Vanport Oregon flood, the 1961 Columbia River Treaty led to the construction of the flood control Duncan Dam in 1967, and Libby Dam in 1975, which regulated water flowing into Kootenay Lake.

Most outflow is diverted 4.5 kilometres (2.8 mi) past Corra Linn along the Kootenay Canal to the more efficient generating station opened in 1976. Kootenay basin reservoirs provide nearly 7,000,000 acre-feet (8.6 km^{3}) of storage which constitutes almost half of the 15,500,000 acre-feet (19.1 km^{3}) stored in Columbia River Treaty reservoirs.

== See also ==
- List of dams in the Columbia River watershed
- List of generating stations in British Columbia
