= Seven Mile Dam =

- Location within British Columbia
- Coordinates: 49.0300°N 117.5037°W
- Opening date: 1979
- Operator: BC Hydro

Dam and spillways
- Impounds: Pend d'Oreille River
- Height: 65 metres (213 ft)
- Width (base): 350 metres (1,150 ft)

Power Station
- Installed capacity: 848 MW
- Capacity factor: 35.2%
- Annual generation: 2.618 TWh (9.42 PJ)

Seven Mile Dam is a concrete gravity-type hydroelectric dam on the Pend d'Oreille River 15 km SE of Trail, 18 km downstream from Boundary Dam and 9 km upstream from Waneta Dam in the Canadian province of British Columbia. The power plant has a capacity of 848 MW and generates 3200 GWh per year. The May, June and early July flow of the river in most years, is greater than the plants capacity. During these times water is spilled, not used to generate power. The reservoir is 420 ha (1,040 acres), which includes 170 ha (425 acres) of flooded river channel. Under the Canal Plant Agreement operations are coordinated with Waneta Dam.

== See also ==
- List of dams in the Columbia River watershed
- List of generating stations in BC
