= Columbia River Treaty =

1961 Canada-United States agreement

The Columbia River Treaty is a 1961 agreement between Canada and the United States on the development and operation of dams in the upper Columbia River basin for power and flood control benefits in both countries. Four dams were constructed under this treaty: three in the Canadian province of British Columbia (Duncan Dam, Mica Dam, Keenleyside Dam) and one in the U.S. state of Montana (Libby Dam).

The treaty provided for the sharing with Canada of half of the downstream U.S. power and flood benefits, and allows the operation of Treaty storage for other benefits. The long-term impacts of the treaty have been mixed: while the dams have provided enormous economic benefits to British Columbia and the U.S. Pacific Northwest through hydroelectric generation and flood control, there are longstanding concerns regarding social and economic impacts to the local communities, and the environmental effects associated with the construction and operation of large dams.

== Background ==
In 1944, the Canadian and U.S. governments agreed to begin studying the potential for joint development of dams in the Columbia River basin. Planning efforts were slow until the 1948 Columbia River flood caused extensive damage from Trail, British Columbia, to near Astoria, Oregon, completely destroying Vanport, the second-largest city in Oregon. The increased interest in flood protection and the growing need for power development initiated 11 years of discussion and alternative proposals for construction of dams in Canada. In 1959, the governments issued a report that recommended principles for negotiating an agreement and apportioning the costs and benefits. Formal negotiations began in February 1960 and the treaty was signed 17 January 1961 by Prime Minister Diefenbaker and President Eisenhower.

The treaty was not implemented until over three years later because of difficulties in creating arrangements for funding the construction of the Canadian dams and marketing the electrical power owed to Canada which was surplus to Canadian needs during the early treaty years. A Treaty Protocol and a Canada-BC agreement were signed in January 1964 that limited and clarified many treaty provisions, defined rights and obligations between the British Columbia and Canadian governments, and allowed for the sale of the Canadian Entitlement to downstream U.S. power authorities (BPA). Instruments of ratification were exchanged and the treaty was implemented on 16 September 1964.

=== United States ===
Starting in the 1930s, the United States constructed dams on the lower Columbia River for power generation, flood control, channel navigation and irrigation in Washington as part of the Columbia Basin Project. Dam construction on the American side of the border thus began prior to the entry into force of the Columbia River Treaty. There were various plans put forward in the early 20th century for major dams on the Columbia, many focused on irrigation, but development did not begin in earnest until the 1930s. During the Great Depression, the U.S. Federal Government provided the impetus for construction, as part of the New Deal make-work program. Construction on the Bonneville and Grand Coulee dams began during this period, but government involvement in Columbia dam construction has continued through to the present.

The long range plans for American development of the Columbia for hydroelectricity came together in the late 1930s. In 1937, the U.S. Congress passed the Bonneville Power Act, creating the Bonneville Power Administration. This was a new federal institution meant to build transmission lines and sell the power generated by Bonneville, Grand Coulee and future Columbia Dams. While these projects substantially increased the ability to control floods and generate power, the system was unable to provide full protection or maximize the amount of power generated. American planners realized that the full potential of the river could only be harnessed through transboundary cooperation to create additional storage capacity above the existing lower Columbia complex. With the storage provided in Canada, water releases could be timed to meet power demand, rather than relying on the snowmelt-determined natural flow rates of the river.

=== Canada ===
British Columbia Premier W. A. C. Bennett and his Social Credit Government were responsible for the development of infrastructure throughout the province during the 1950s and 1960s. Bennett was the Canadian force behind the Columbia River Treaty and as a believer in the development of public power, he created and promoted a "Two Rivers Policy". This policy outlined the hydroelectric development of two major rivers within the province of British Columbia: the Peace River and the Columbia River. Bennett wanted to develop the Peace River to fuel northern expansion and development, while using the Columbia River to provide power to growing industries throughout the province.

The ongoing negotiations of the Columbia River Treaty provided a unique opportunity for Bennett to fulfil his Two Rivers Policy by working around British Columbia's monetary issues. During the 1950s, the government of British Columbia lacked the funds necessary to develop both the Columbia and Peace rivers and privately owned utility BC Electric was unwilling to pay for hydroelectric development on these rivers. Therefore, the BC Energy Board recommended that hydroelectric development be undertaken as a public venture. On 1 August 1961 Bill 5 was proposed to the BC legislature calling for provincial control over BC Electric and creation of the Peace River Power Development Company. Later that month, Bill 5 was passed into law paving the way for the creation of BC Hydro in 1963, completing Bennett's vision of "public power". BC Hydro thereafter consisted of BC Electric, the Peace River Power Development Company and the BC Power Commission. The creation of a government-owned power entity allowed Bennett to finance the dams and powerhouses on the Columbia at lower interest rates, thus reducing the cost. The BC-Canada Agreement of 8 July 1963 designated BC Hydro as the entity responsible for Canadian dams outlined in the treaty and annual operations of the treaty.

Bennett directed the negotiations for a Canadian Entitlement sales agreement which provided the funds to develop both the Columbia and the Peace rivers simultaneously. Since it was illegal for Canada to export power during the 1950s and 1960s, the funds provided by the Columbia River Treaty entitlement were the only affordable way for British Columbia to develop both rivers, thus the treaty became integral to Bennett's vision of power in British Columbia. With the cash received from the sale of the additional power generation of the Canadian Entitlement (approximately C$274.8 million in September 1964 for the first 30 years) the BC government proceeded to develop power facilities on both the Columbia and Peace Rivers, fulfilling Bennett's 'Two River Policy'.

In short, BC pursued the Columbia River Treaty because it provided a unique opportunity for hydroelectric development that otherwise would not have been possible (due to the financial situation of the province during that period). It was the hope that these developments would promote industrial growth within the province and help expand the economy.

== Treaty provisions ==
Duncan Dam
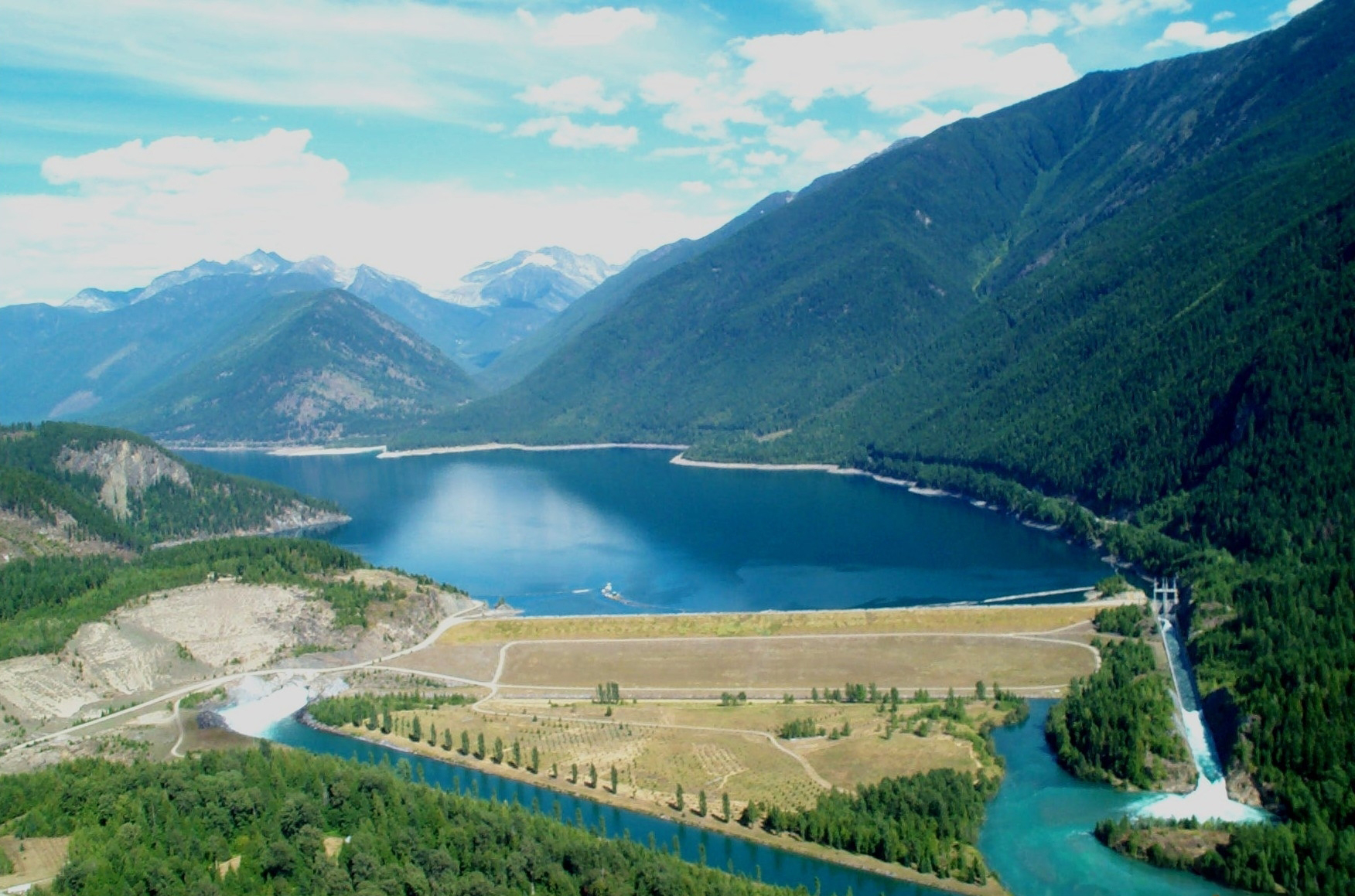
- Interactive map of Duncan Dam
- Country: Canada
- Location: Howser, British Columbia
- Coordinates: 50°15′03″N 116°57′03″W

Dam and spillways
- Impounds: Duncan River

Reservoir
- Creates: Duncan Lake
- Total capacity: 1.70 km^{3} (1.38 million acre⋅ft)

Hugh Keenleyside Dam
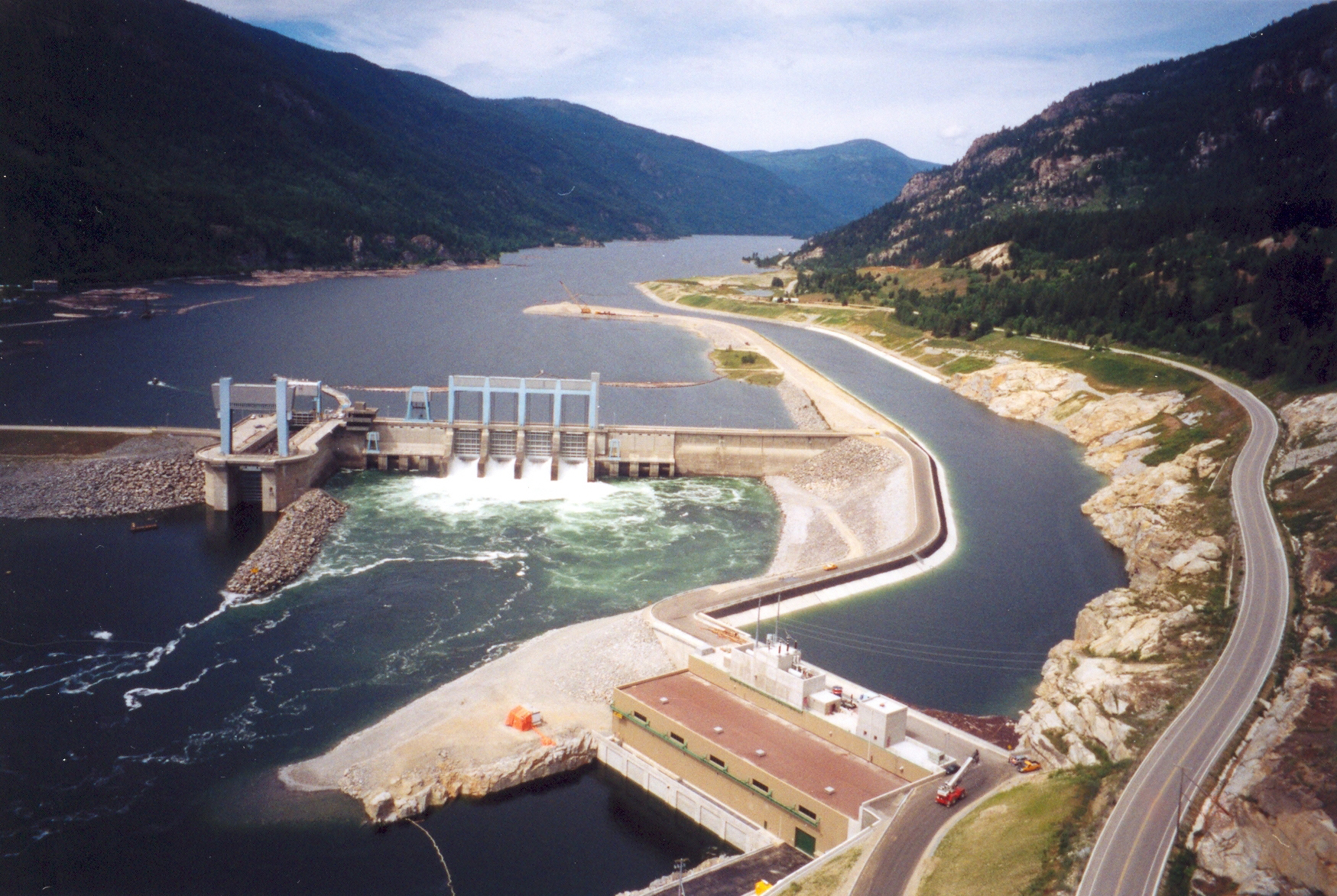
- Interactive map of Hugh Keenleyside Dam
- Country: Canada
- Location: Castlegar, British Columbia
- Coordinates: 49°20′22″N 117°46′19″W

Dam and spillways
- Impounds: Columbia River

Reservoir
- Creates: Arrow Lakes
- Total capacity: 8.76 km^{3} (7.10 million acre⋅ft)

Mica Dam
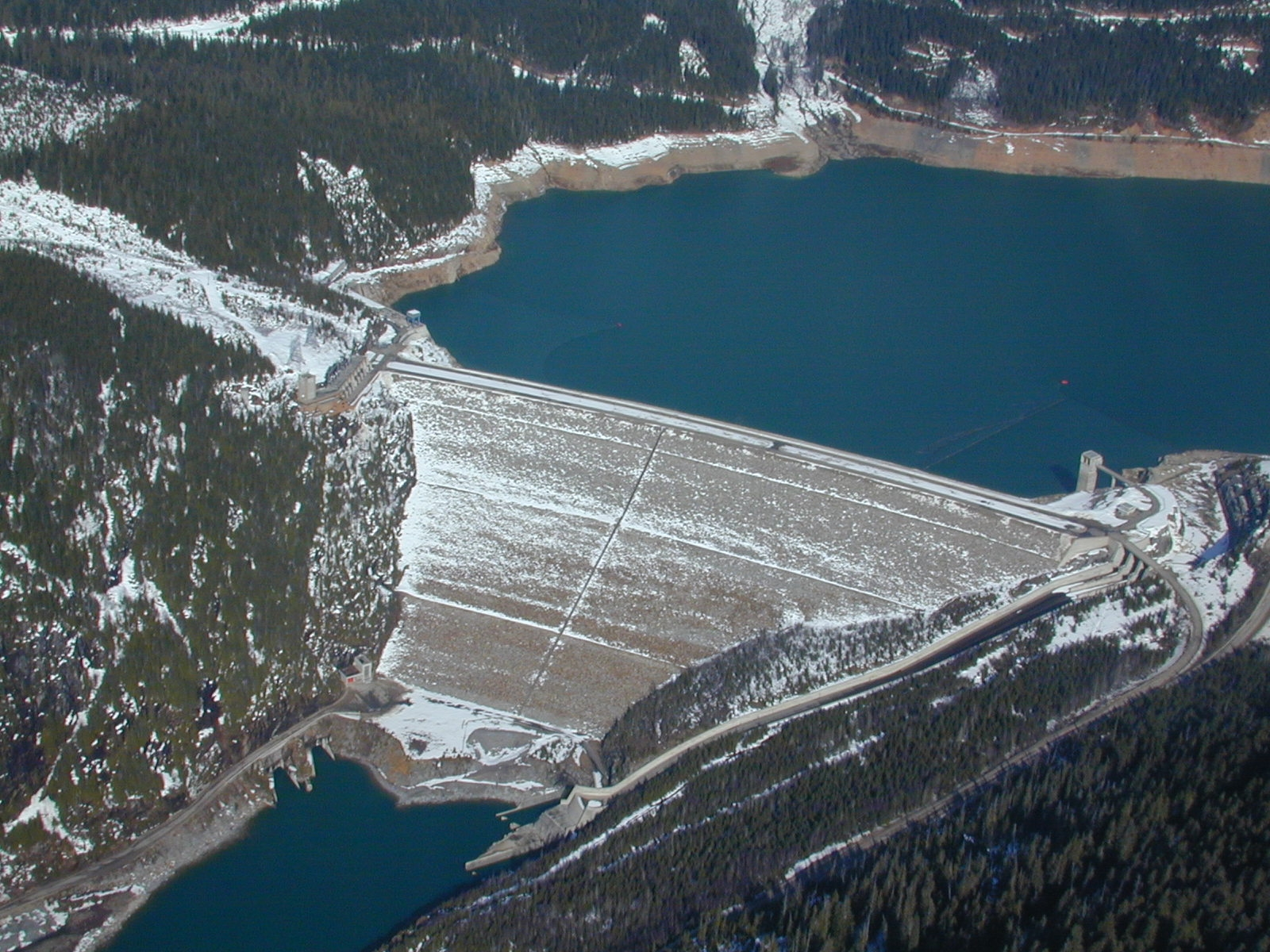
- Interactive map of Mica Dam
- Country: Canada
- Location: Mica Creek, British Columbia
- Coordinates: 52°04′40″N 118°33′59″W

Dam and spillways
- Impounds: Columbia River

Reservoir
- Creates: Kinbasket Lake
- Total capacity: 15 km^{3} (12 million acre⋅ft)

Libby Dam
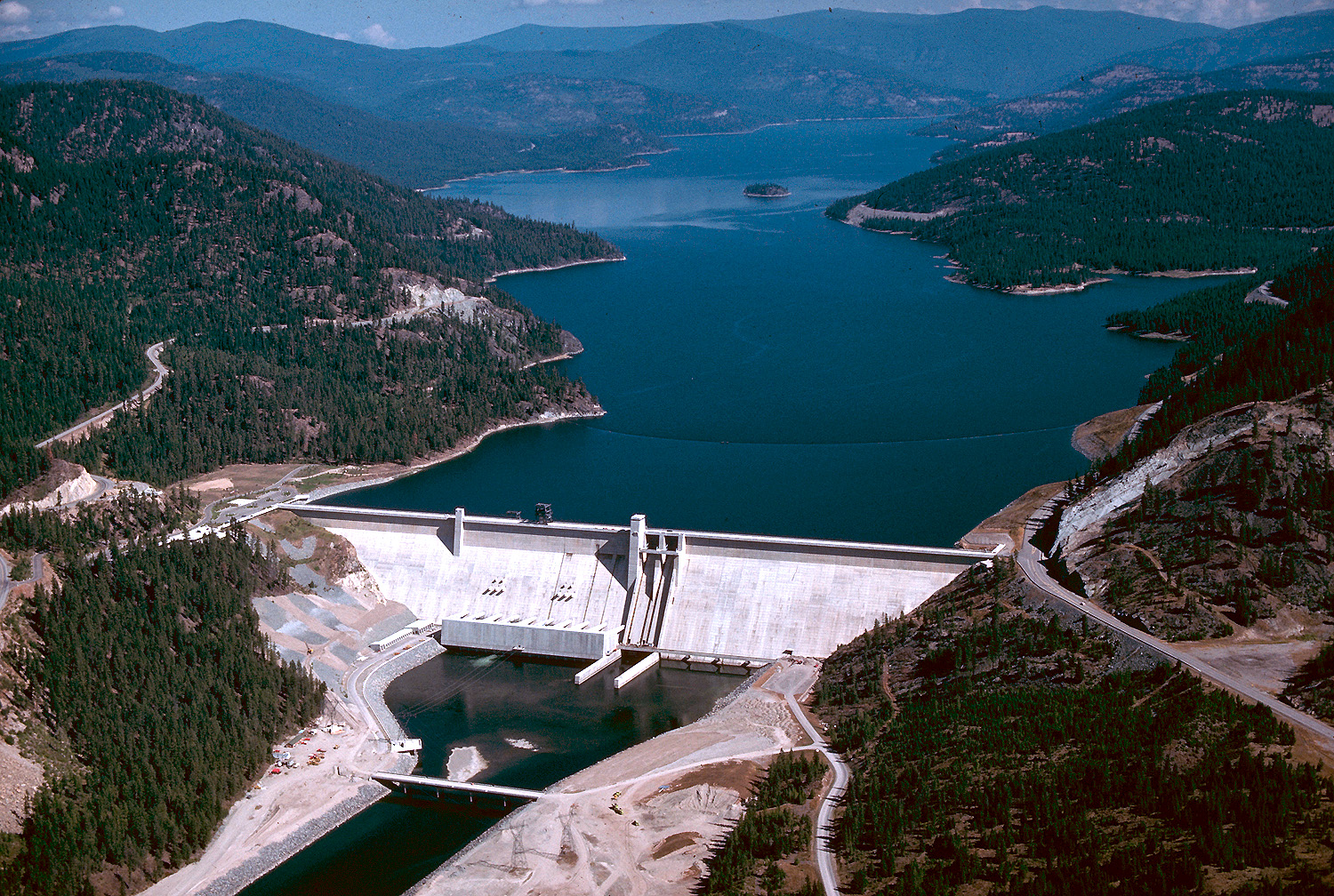
- Interactive map of Libby Dam
- Country: United States
- Location: Libby, Montana
- Coordinates: 48°24′37″N 115°18′54″W

Dam and spillways
- Impounds: Kootenai River

Reservoir
- Creates: Lake Koocanusa
- Total capacity: 7.43 km^{3} (6.02 million acre⋅ft)

Under the terms of the agreement, Canada was required to provide 19.12 km^{3} (15.5 million acre-feet [Maf]) of usable reservoir storage behind three large dams. This was to be accomplished with 1.73 km^{3} (1.4 Maf) provided by Duncan Dam (1967), 8.76 km^{3} (7.1 Maf) provided by Arrow Dam (1968) (subsequently renamed the Hugh Keenleyside Dam), and 8.63 km^{3} (7.0 Maf) provided by Mica Dam (1973). The latter dam, however, was built higher than required by the treaty, and thus provides a total of 14.80 km^{3} (12 Maf) including 6.17 km^{3} (5.0 Maf) of Non Treaty Storage space. Unless otherwise agreed, the three Canadian Treaty projects are required to operate for flood protection and increased power generation at-site and downstream in both Canada and the United States, although the allocation of water storage operations among the three projects is at Canadian discretion. The downstream power and flood control benefits in the United States created by the operation of Canada's Treaty reservoirs are shared by the two countries in accordance with Treaty provisions.

The treaty also allowed the U.S. to build the Libby Dam on the Kootenai River in Montana which provides a further 6.14 km^{3} (4.98 Maf) of active storage in the Koocanusa reservoir. Although the name sounds like it might be of aboriginal origins, it is actually a concatenation of the first three letters from Kootenai / Kootenay, Canada and USA, and was the winning entry in a contest to name the reservoir. Water behind the Libby dam floods back 42 mi (68 km) into Canada, while the water released from the dam returns to Canada just upstream of Kootenay Lake. Libby Dam began operation in March 1972 and is operated for power, flood control and other benefits at-site and downstream in both Canada and the United States. The U.S. did not pay Canada for the land submerged by the Libby Dam reservoir and Canada does not pay the U.S. for the resulting power and flood control benefits downstream on the Kootenay River.

With the exception of the Mica Dam, which was designed and constructed with a powerhouse, the Canadian Treaty projects were initially built for the sole purpose of regulating water flow. In 2002, however, a joint venture between the Columbia Power Corporation and the Columbia Basin Trust constructed the 185 MW Arrow Lakes Hydro project in parallel with the Keenleyside Dam near Castlegar, 35 years after the storage dam was originally completed. The Duncan Dam remains a storage project, and has no power generation facilities.

The Canadian and U.S. Entities defined by the treaty, and appointed by the national governments, manage most of the treaty required activities. The Canadian Entity is BC Hydro and Power Authority, and the U.S. Entity is the Administrator of the Bonneville Power Administration and the Northwestern Division Engineer for the U.S. Army Corps of Engineers. The treaty also established a Permanent Engineering Board, consisting of equal members from Canada and the U.S., that reports to both governments annually on Treaty issues, any deviations from the operating plans, and assists the Entities in resolving any disputes.

=== Payment for U.S. benefits ===
As payment for the U.S. benefits realized by the Canadian storage operation, the treaty required the U.S. to:

1. deliver to Canada half of the estimated increase in U.S. downstream power benefits, on an ongoing basis (the **Canadian Entitlement**), and
2. make a one-time monetary payment as each of the dams were completed for half of the value of the estimated future flood damages prevented in the U.S.

The Canadian Entitlement is calculated five years in advance for each operating year using an agreed treaty calculation method, and the amount varies mainly as a function of forecasted power loads, thermal generating resources and operating procedures. The method gives Canada a "first-added" storage benefit that ignores U.S. dams built after 1961 (e.g. Libby and Dworshak), limits sales of surplus power to California, and excludes modern fish related constraints at U.S. dams. Without the first two of these limits, the Canadian Entitlement would be slightly less than half of current values. The Canadian Entitlement is marketed by Powerex. The Canadian Entitlement varies from year to year, but is generally in the range of 4,400 GWh per year and about 1,250 MW of capacity.

The treaty required the U.S. to pay a total of $64.4 million (C$69.6 million) for the flood control benefits due to the operation of 8.45 Maf of Canadian storage. The payment was based on an allocation that:

1. gives Canada equal credit to U.S. projects existing in 1961 (better than first added),
2. ignores the flood control benefits provided by Libby and other post-1961 U.S. projects, and
3. also ignores the flood control benefits provided by the Canadian power storage operation that normally drafts far more than the 8.45 Maf flood control obligation. The estimated annual benefit was capitalized for an up-front payment based on a low U.S. interest rate of 3 7/8 percent for the flood damages prevented until September 2024. The U.S. insisted on determining the payment based on benefits until 2024 because the alternative was to construct U.S. dams that would be fully paid for by then. Canada accepted the calculation method and explained to Parliament that the $64.4 million is 24% greater than the value to Canada at 5 1/2% interest of annual payments made in perpetuity. Absent any new agreements, the U.S. purchase of an annual operation of Canadian storage for flood control will expire in 2024 and be replaced with an option for the U.S. to "Call Upon" Canadian storage for flood control needs that cannot adequately be met by U.S. projects, and the U.S. must pay Canada for operating costs and any economic losses due to requested flood control operations.

=== Termination ===
The treaty has no end date, but it includes an option for either country to terminate most treaty provisions anytime after 60 years (i.e. 16 September 2024), given at least 10 years advance notice. If the treaty is terminated, several provisions continue including Called Upon flood control, operation and coordination of Libby, and Kootenay River diversion rights.

The Canadian and U.S. governments reviewed the treaty before the 2014 opportunity for notice for earliest termination. Options generally fell into three categories:

- Continue the treaty with the automatic change to called upon flood control,
- Terminate the treaty (with continued called upon flood control), or
- Negotiate changes to the treaty that modify the flood control and power obligations and/or create new provisions for other benefits, especially environmental objectives.

The BC and US governments launched websites to inform and engage citizens about the review.

As of March 9, 2025, the Trump Administration has said they "want changes" made to the Columbia River Treaty.

== Impacts ==
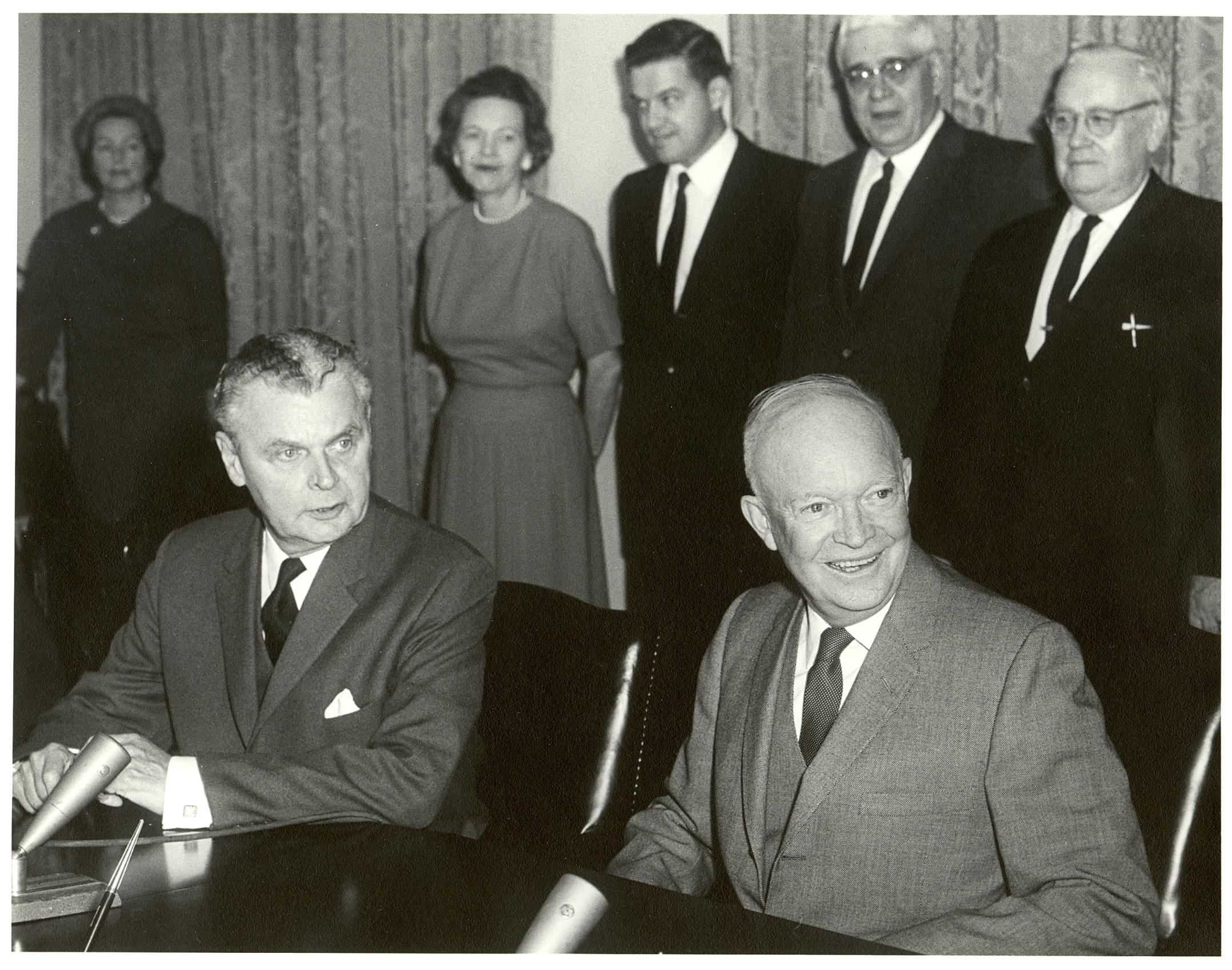
Canadian Prime Minister John Diefenbaker (seated left) and US President Dwight Eisenhower at the signing of the Columbia River Treaty, 1961

There was initial controversy over the Columbia River Treaty when British Columbia refused to give consent to ratify it on the grounds that while the province would be committed to building the three major dams within its borders, it would have no assurance of a purchaser for the Canadian Entitlement which was surplus to the province's needs at the time. The final ratification came in 1964 when a consortium of 37 public and four private utilities in the United States agreed to pay C$274.8 million to purchase the Canadian Entitlement for a period of 30 years from the scheduled completion date of each of the Canadian projects. British Columbia used the funds, along with the U.S. payment of C$69.6 million for U.S. flood control benefits, to construct the Canadian dams.

In recent years, the treaty has garnered significant attention, not because of what it contains, but because of what it is lacking. A reflection of the times in which it was negotiated, the treaty's emphasis is on hydroelectricity and flood control. The "Assured Operating Plans" that determine the Canadian Entitlement amounts and establish a base operation for Canadian Treaty storage, include little direct treatment of other interests that have grown in importance over the years, such as fish protection, irrigation and other environmental concerns. However, the treaty permits the Entities to incorporate a broad range of interests into the "Detailed Operating Plans" that are agreed to immediately prior to the operating year, and which modify the "Assured Operating Plans" to produce results more advantageous to both countries. For more than 20 years, the "Detailed Operating Plans" have included a growing number of fish-friendly operations designed to address environmental concerns on both sides of the border.

BC Premier W. A. C. Bennett was a major player in negotiating the treaty and, according to U.S. Senator Clarence Dill, was a tough bargainer. The U.S. paid C$275 million, which accrued to C$458 million after interest. But Bennett's successor Dave Barrett was skeptical about the deal; he observed that the three dams and associated power lines ultimately cost three times that figure, in addition to other costs. Dr. Hugh L. Keenleyside (for whom Keenleyside dam is named) dismissed these claims and other confusion about the treaty benefits and costs in his 1974 paper "Ten Year Later, The Results of the Columbia River Treaty." He explained that the original estimate of the cost of the Canadian dams was about C$411 million in 1963 dollars. Actual cost in 1973 dollars was about C$548 million, and this included $50 million in regional improvement beyond replacement of like for like. This was a 33% increase over ten years, and he noted that during that time the average cost of dams and reservoirs in Canada increased by 80%. The value of the U.S. power and flood control payments in 1973 dollars, which had increased with interest, was C$479 million; leaving a deficit of C$69 million. For this cost, BC was then able to add a power house at Mica, and later at Kootenay Canal, Revelstoke and Keenleyside, and construct transmission lines, to delivery power to major load centers far cheaper than alternatives. Since the end of the 30-year sale of the Canadian Entitlement to the U.S. in March 2003, the U.S. delivery of the Entitlement power to BC has been a benefit far greater than the C$5 million per year estimate by the Canadian government in 1964. The BC government reported in Dec. 2012 that the average annual revenue from the Canadian Entitlement power, which is marketed by POWEREX for the Province, over the previous ten years was C$202 million per year. Those revenues go into the Province's Consolidated Revenue Fund.

=== Social impacts ===
==== Local ====
Various attitudes were generated from local residents who would be affected directly or indirectly by the construction of the Columbia River Treaty dams. BC Hydro had to relocate and compensate for people's loss of land and homes. In Arrow Lake, 3,144 properties had to be bought and 1,350 people had to be relocated. With the construction of the Duncan Dam 39 properties were bought and 30 people moved, subsequently at Mica Dam 25 properties including trap lines and other economic resourceful lands were bought. Since Arrow Lake had the largest number of people needing to be relocated it generated the most controversy and varying of opinions. People who worked on the dam felt a sense of pride and purpose for being able to provide for their families on a long-term basis. However, due to the exclusion of local hearings for the treaty and the outcome of the Arrow Dam many residents felt powerless in the provinces decision to flood the area. In response, the Columbia Basin Trust was established, in part, to address the long term socio-economic impacts in British Columbia that resulted from this flooding.

J.W Wilson who took part in the settlement agreement for BC Hydro noticed that while they looked at the physical value of the resident's houses they were unable to include the losses that went along with living self-sufficiently, which was a lifestyle that would not be possible in a city or urban area. The kind of wealth that went unnoticed consisted of agriculture, livestock, tourism and lumber. Paying minimal taxes also enabled a self-sufficient lifestyle with little cost. In addition, from an outsiders perspective it seemed as though BC Hydro was being fair with the resident's settlement prices for their land and homes. However, many people thought that the settlement prices from BC Hydro were unfair, but were intimidated and felt powerless to challenge them in court, so they accepted the prices begrudgingly. The residents questioned what benefits the dam would have for them if they were just going to be relocated, and lose money in the long run. However, BC Hydro built new communities for those living from Nakusp to Edgewood, as part of the compensation process. These communities came with BC Hydro electricity, running water, telephone services, a school, a church, a park and stores. Finally, building the dam did provide work for many families, and supplied electricity to remote communities that were once out of reach of BC's transmission grid, and dependent on gas and diesel generators.

Despite receiving physical reimbursement, Wilson argues that the emotional loss of peoples homes and familiar landscape could not be compensated, and increased the physical and psychological stress of relocating their homes and communities. The emotional loss was especially difficult for the First Nations people living around these areas. The Sinixt people who occupied the Columbia River Valley for thousands of years, lost sacred burial grounds, an extremely devastating experience for their community. Furthermore, the Sinixt were labeled as officially extinct by the Canadian government in 1953 despite many Sinixt people still being alive. It is questionable the timing of labeling these people extinct, with the quick follow up of signing the Columbia River Treat a few years after. With that in mind Indian Affairs of Canada had to power to possibly influence the signing of the dams in particular the Libby and Wardner Dam and potential cost of replacement as well as "rehabilitating Indians". However, due to the push to assimilate First Nations people into a cash-based economy, and no reserves being physically affected by the dams, Indian Affairs had minimal participation and influence. Once again, like BC Hydro, Indian Affairs disregarded hunting, fishing, gathering and sacred grounds as having either material, emotional or spiritual significance to First Nations people.

==== Provincial ====
The objective of the International Joint Commission (IJC), with regard to the development of the Columbia River Basin, was to accomplish with the Columbia River Treaty (CRT) what would not have been possible through either British Columbia (BC) or the U.S. operating individually. It was expected that either additional costs would have been avoided or additional benefits gained by the cooperation between BC/Canada and the U.S. However, many felt that such expectations were left unrealized by the effects of the actual treaty. Soon after the treaty came into effect, it became apparent that greater combined returns had not necessarily been achieved than had each country continued operating independently. Others dispute that idea.

Over the lifespan of the treaty, both positive and negative impacts have been felt by the province of British Columbia. For BC, the positive impacts of the treaty have included both direct and indirect economic and social benefits. Direct benefits came in the form of better flood protection, increased power generation at both new and existing facilities, assured winter flows (for power) and the Canadian Entitlement power currently owed to BC by the U.S. (valued at approximately $300 million annually). At the beginning of the treaty, the province received lump sum payments from the U.S. for the sale of the Canadian Entitlement for 30 years and for the provision of 60 years of assured flood protection to the Northwestern States. Indirect benefits to the province have included the creation of employment opportunities for several thousand people in the construction and operation of dams as well as lower power rates for customers in both BC and the Northwestern U.S. Furthermore, many later developments in BC were made possible by the CRT because of water regulation provided by upstream storage. The Kootenay Canal Plant (1975), Revelstoke Dam (1984), 185 MW Arrow Lakes Generating Station and the Brilliant Expansion Project are examples of these developments. Another project made possible in part by the CRT was the Pacific DC Intertie, which was constructed in the U.S. and to this day remains a key part of the western power grid, facilitating easy trading of power between all parts of western Canada and the western U.S.

However, for the province of BC, the impacts of the CRT were not entirely positive. By 1974, only ten years after the signing of the treaty, professors, politicians and experts across BC were divided on how beneficial it was to the province. Many said that the terms of the treaty would never have been accepted in their present day. The negative impacts of the CRT have affected both the economy and the environment of BC. Treaty revenue from U.S. was used to pay in part for the construction of the Duncan, Keenleyside and Mica dams, but the cost to BC to build the three dams exceeded the revenue initially received from the sale of downstream power and flood control benefits. The province also had to pay for improved highway, bridges, railway relocation, as well as welfare increases for the people affected by installation of the dams. Because of this deficit, it is alleged that school and hospital construction suffered, and services such as the Forest Service, highways and water resources were secretly tapped for funds.

It has become obvious, in retrospect, that the 30-year sale of the Canadian Entitlement was underestimated at the time of the treaty signing. W. A. C. Bennett's administration has often been criticized for being short-sighted in initial negotiations, but it was difficult to accurately value these agreements at the time. In 1960, Columbia River power produced half a million tons of aluminum for the U.S. By 1974, treaty power had increased this production threefold, hurting BC's own aluminum production, effectively exporting thousands of jobs in this industry. Further negative impacts include the flooding of approximately 600 km^{2} of fertile and productive valley bottoms to fill the Arrow Lakes, Duncan, Kinbasket and Koocanusa reservoirs. No assessment of the value of flooded forest land was ever made; land which could have produced valuable timber for the BC economy.

=== Environmental impacts ===
==== Canada ====
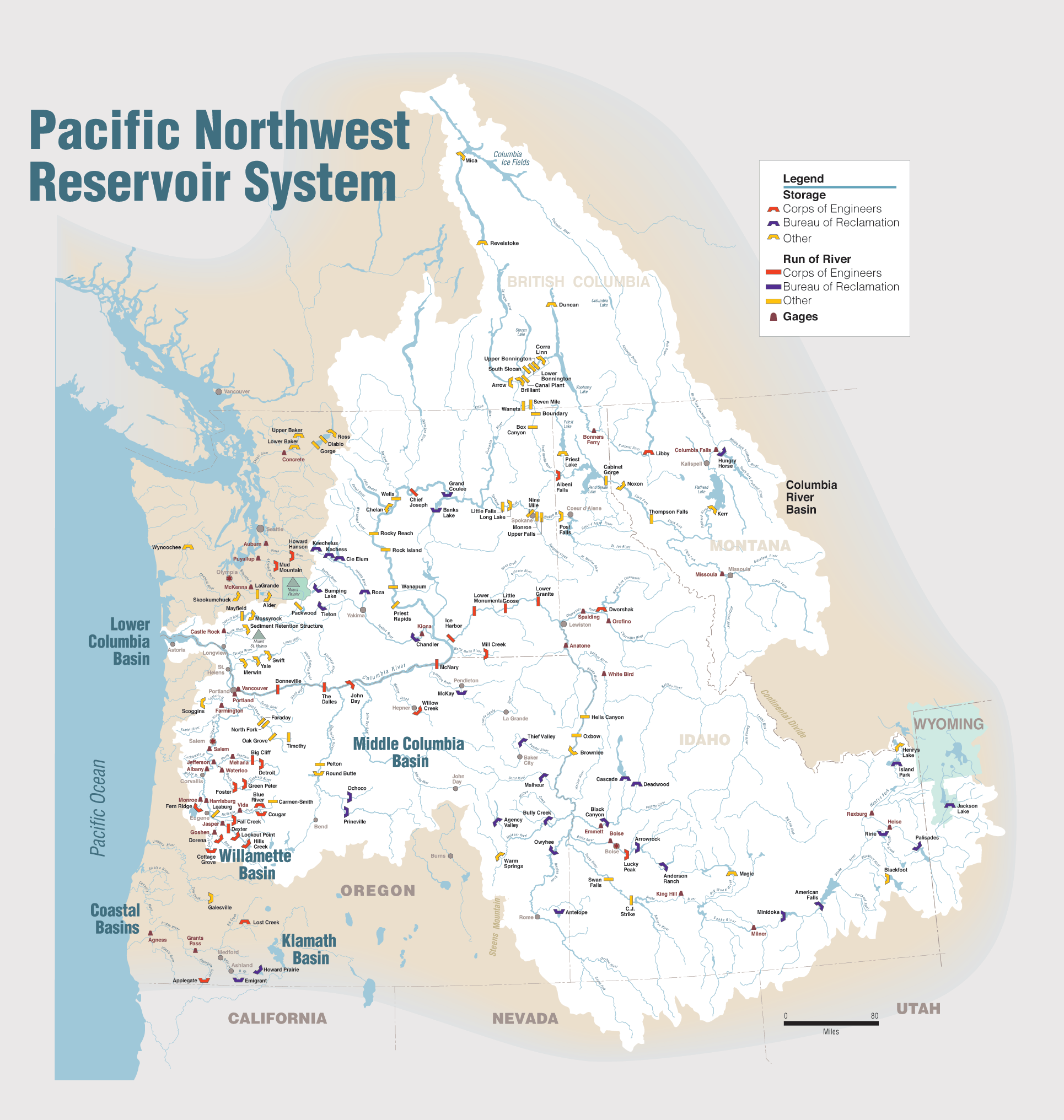

The Columbia River has the greatest annual drainage as compared to all other rivers along the Pacific coast. Before the introduction of dams on the river, the changes in water level rose and fell predictably with the seasons and a nine-meter displacement existed between the spring snowmelt highs and fall lows. After the dams were built, the river flows changed and in some areas the previous maximum and minimum water levels were altered by several tens of meters. High spring–summer flows were reduced, and fall–winter flows were increased to satisfy United States power demands. After the damming, the water during high floods began to cover much of the valley's arable land—and when it was drawn down to produce power it carried away fertile soil, leaving agricultural land useless. Additionally, it is estimated that the habitat of 8,000 deer, 600 elk, 1,500 moose, 2,000 black bears, and 70,000 ducks and geese was flooded due to the creation of the reservoirs.

The introduction of a dam affects every living thing in the surrounding area, both up and downstream. Upstream change is obvious as water levels rise and submerge nesting grounds and migration routes for water fowl. As water levels in storage reservoirs change throughout the year, aquatic habitat and food source availability become unreliable. Plankton, a main staple of salmon and trout's diet, is especially sensitive to changes in water level. Nutrient-rich sediment, that would previously have flowed downstream, becomes trapped in the reservoirs above dams, resulting in changes in water properties and temperatures on either side of the barrier. A difference in water temperature of 9 degrees Celsius (48 °F) was once measured between the Columbia and its tributary the Snake River. When silt settles to the bottom of the river or reservoir it covers rocks, ruins spawning grounds and eliminates all hiding place for smaller fish to escape from predators. Alteration in water quality, such as acidity or gas saturation, may not be visually dramatic, but can be deadly to certain types of aquatic life. The Columbia River, with its series of dams and reservoirs, is influenced by a complex combination of these effects, making it difficult to predict or understand exactly how the animal populations will react.

Salmon and Steelhead trout travel from the ocean upriver to various spawning grounds. The construction of multiple dams on the Columbia threatened this fishery as the fish struggled to complete the migration upstream. All dams on the Columbia River downstream of Chief Joseph have fish ladders installed, from Wells to Bonneville Dam.

Migration downriver is also problematic after dams are built. Pre-dam currents on the Columbia efficiently carried fry to the ocean, but the introduction of dams and reservoirs changed the flow of the river, forcing the young fish to exert much more energy to swim through slack waters. In addition, many fish are killed by the dam turbines as they try to swim further downstream. It is unclear exactly how many fish are killed in the turbines, but old estimates range between 8 and 12% per dam. If a fish hatches high upstream they will have to swim through multiple dams, leading to possible cumulative losses of over 50 to 80% of the migrating fry. Efforts to make turbines safer for fish to pass through have significantly reduced fish loses to near pre-dam levels. While hatcheries appear to be quite successful for some species of fish, their efforts to increase fish populations will not be effective until up and downstream migration is improved. There is no one solution to improving the salmon and trout populations on the Columbia as it is the cumulative effects of the dams, slack-water reservoirs, loss of habitat, pollution and overfishing that are killing the fish. From 1965 to 1969, 27,312 acres were logged along the Columbia River to remove timber from the new flood plain. The slashing of vegetation along the shoreline weakened soil stability and made the land susceptible to wind erosion, creating sandstorms. Conversely, in wet periods, the cleared areas turned into vast mud flats.

In the late 1940s, the BC Fish and Wildlife Branch began studying the impacts the dams were having on the area's animal inhabitants. Their findings resulted in a small sum being designated for further research and harm mitigation. Their work, in collaboration with local conservation groups, became focused on preserving Kokanee stock jeopardized by the Duncan Dam which ruined kilometers of spawning grounds key to Kokanee, Bull Trout and Rainbow Trout survival. Since Rainbow and Bull Trout feed on Kokanee, it was essential Kokanee stock remained strong. As a result, BC Hydro funded the construction of Meadow Creek Spawning Channel in 1967, which is 3.3 km (2.1 miles) long, and at the time was longest human-made spawning ground and first made for fresh water sport fish. The channel supports 250,000 spawning Kokanee every year, resulting in 10 to 15 million fry, with the mean egg to fry survival rate at around 45%. BC Hydro has also provided some funding to Creston Valley Wildlife Management Area to help alleviate damage done by Duncan Dam to surrounding habitats. The area is a seasonal home to many unique bird species, such as Tundra Swans, Greater White-Fronted Geese and many birds of prey. Such species are sensitive to changes in the river as they rely on it for food and their nesting grounds are typically found quite close to the water. BC Hydro, in partnership with the province of BC and Fisheries and Oceans Canada, has also been contributing to the Columbia Basin Fish and Wildlife Compensation Program since 1988.

==== United States ====
Unlike the Columbia's Canadian reach, the U.S. portion of the river had already been heavily developed by the time the treaty entered into force. Because the U.S. role in the agreement was largely to supply power-generating capacity, and that capacity was already in place, it was not obligated to construct any new dams. While in the Upper Columbia, treaty dams meant the filling of large reservoirs, submerging large tracts of land, on the Lower Columbia no new dams had to be built. The local effects of dam construction were limited to those of the Libby Dam in Montana. The U.S. was authorized to build this optional dam on the Kootenay River, a tributary of the Columbia. Lake Koocanusa, Libby Dam's reservoir, extends some distance into Canada.

Because this project involved a transboundary reservoir, it was slow to move from planning to construction. By 1966, when construction began, the environmental movement had begun to have some political currency. Environmental impact assessments found that this dam would be deleterious to a variety of large game animals, including big-horned sheep and elk. While the Libby Dam opened the possibilities of downstream irrigation, scientists determined that it would also destroy valuable wetland ecosystems and alter the river hydrology throughout the area of its extent, in the reservoir and far downstream.

Under pressure from environmental activist groups, the Army Corps of Engineers developed a mitigation plan that represents a major departure from the previous treaty dams. This plan addressed concerns about fish by building hatcheries, acquired land to serve as grazing areas for animals whose normal ranges were submerged, and implemented a technological fix as part of the dam project that enabled control of the temperature of water released from the dam.

The local environmental impact of the Libby Dam was to flood 40,000 acres (around 162 square kilometers), altering downstream and upstream ecosystems. This was the greatest direct environmental effect of the treaty in the United States. While the Libby Dam and Lake Koocanusa were the most visible results of the treaty in the U.S., there were long-ranging environmental implications of the new management regime. The increased storage capacity in the Upper Columbia dams afforded river managers a much greater degree of control over the river's hydrograph. Peak flows could now be more dramatically reduced, and low flows bolstered by controlled releases from storage. Peak power demands tend to occur in midwinter and midsummer, so river managers calibrate releases to coincide with periods of high demand. This is a dramatic change from the snowmelt-driven summer peak flows of the river prior to its development.

== See also ==
- List of dams in the Columbia River watershed
- BC Hydro and Power Authority, provincially owned power utility and owner/operator of Mica, Arrow & Duncan dams
- Columbia Basin Trust, province of British Columbia effort to mitigate impacts of the treaty
- Columbia Power Corporation, a province owned crown corporation and sister agency with CBT.
- Bonneville Power Administration, U.S. federal agency managing sale and transmission of federal power in the Pacific Northwest
- United States Army Corps of Engineers, U.S. federal agency managing Libby dam and many other public works projects
- International Joint Commission, binational commission to prevent and resolve U.S. and Canada disputes over boundary waters
- W. A. C. Bennett, Premier of British Columbia who led the development of dams on the upper Columbia and Peace Rivers
- Grand Coulee Dam, the largest dam on the Columbia River
- Kootenai River, upstream Columbia tributary that begins in Canada, enters U.S., and returns to Canada
