= Columbia Basin Trust =

Columbia Basin Trust was created by the Columbia Basin Trust Act (British Columbia) in 1995 to benefit the region most adversely affected by the Columbia River Treaty (CRT), in the Canadian province of British Columbia.

The CRT, ratified by the United States and Canada in 1964, led to the construction of three storage dams in the Basin (the Duncan, Keenleyside and Mica dams) and one in Montana (Libby Dam). The purpose of these dams was flood control and power production in both countries. Most of the benefits of the CRT were enjoyed by areas outside the Basin while most of the negative effects were, and still are, felt by the Basin.

There was a lack of prior consultation with the people of the Basin, including the 2,300 residents who were displaced by flooding of their communities and farms. The people of the Basin came together in the early 1990s to press the Province for recognition of the injustice of this situation. Local governments in the Basin coordinated their efforts at the regional district and tribal council level under the Columbia River Treaty Committee, which first met in 1992.

The committee, in partnership with elected officials from the region, negotiated with the Province. They had two objectives:

1. The creation of a trust governed by a board of Basin residents.
2. The allocation to the region of funds representing a fair share of the ongoing downstream benefits earned under the CRT, to be managed by the trust.

On both counts negotiations were successful and Columbia Basin Trust was formed. Columbia Basin Trust received a $295 million endowment by the Province.

1. $250 million is committed to finance power project construction.
2. As directed by Basin residents, $45 million is being reinvested for the benefit of Basin residents through short-term cash investments, business loans, real estate ownership, and venture capital projects.
3. In addition, Columbia Basin Trust receives $2 million per year from 1996 to 2012.

The Province further committed to transfer $250 million to the Columbia Power Corporation (CPC), Columbia Basin Trust's Joint Venture Partner in power projects in the Basin. Fifty per cent of the net profits go to Columbia Basin Trust for the benefit of the people of the Basin. The income from the investments is being spent on social, economic and environmental benefits for the residents of the Basin.

The Arrow Lakes generating station, jointly owned by Columbia Power Corporation and Columbia Basin Trust, won one of three Blue Planet prizes presented by the International Hydropower Association in 2005 for "social, environmental and technical excellence."
