= Keenleyside Dam =

Hugh Keenleyside Dam
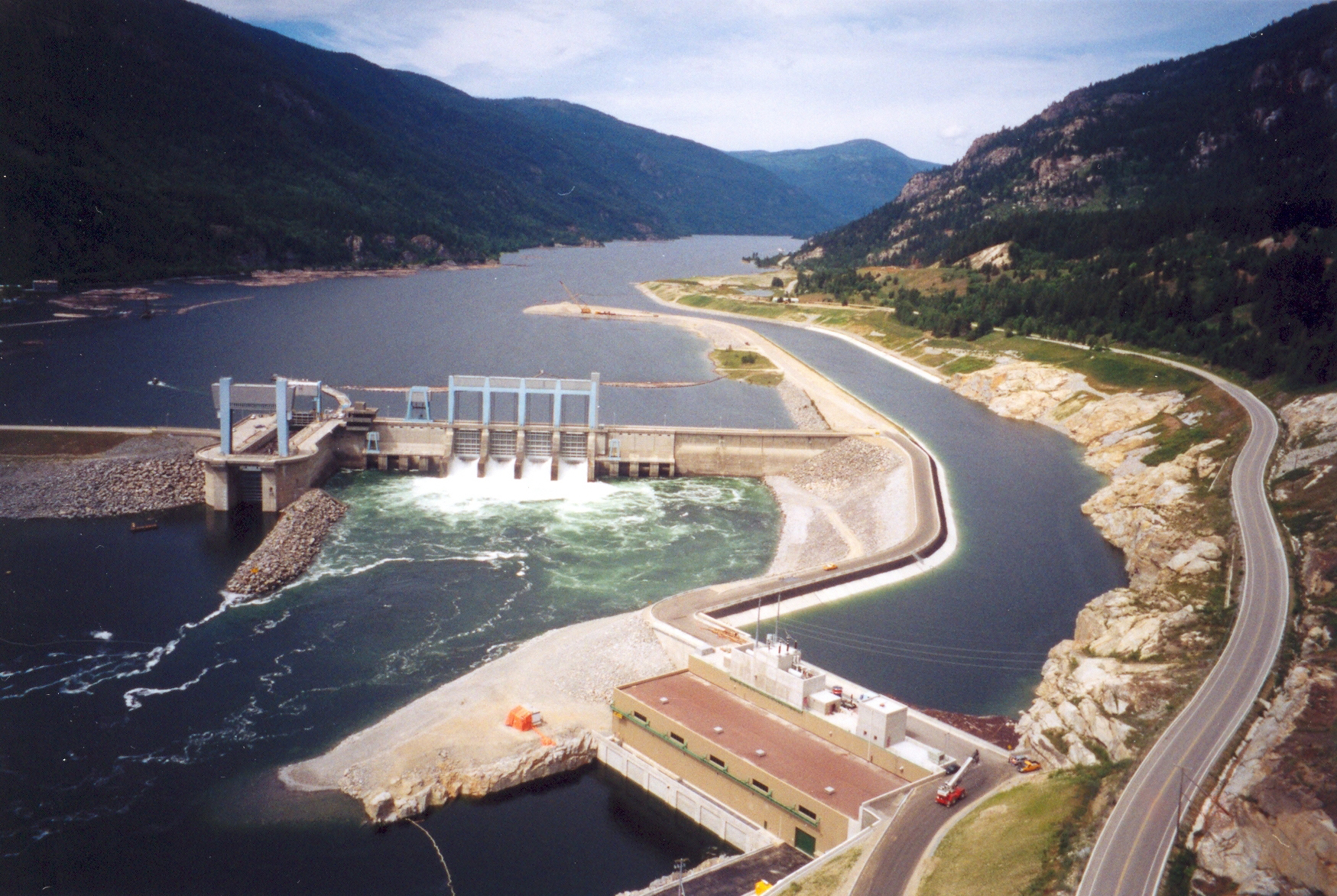

- Location within British Columbia
- Location: Castlegar, British Columbia, Canada
- Coordinates: 49°20′22″N 117°46′19″W
- Construction began: 1968

Dam and spillways
- Impounds: Columbia River
- Height: 52 m (171 ft)
- Length: 853.4 m (2,800 ft)

Reservoir
- Creates: Arrow Lakes
- Total capacity: 8.76 km^{3} (7,100,000 acre⋅ft)

Power Station
- Turbines: 2
- Installed capacity: 185 MW
- Capacity factor: 47.5%
- Annual generation: 770 GWh

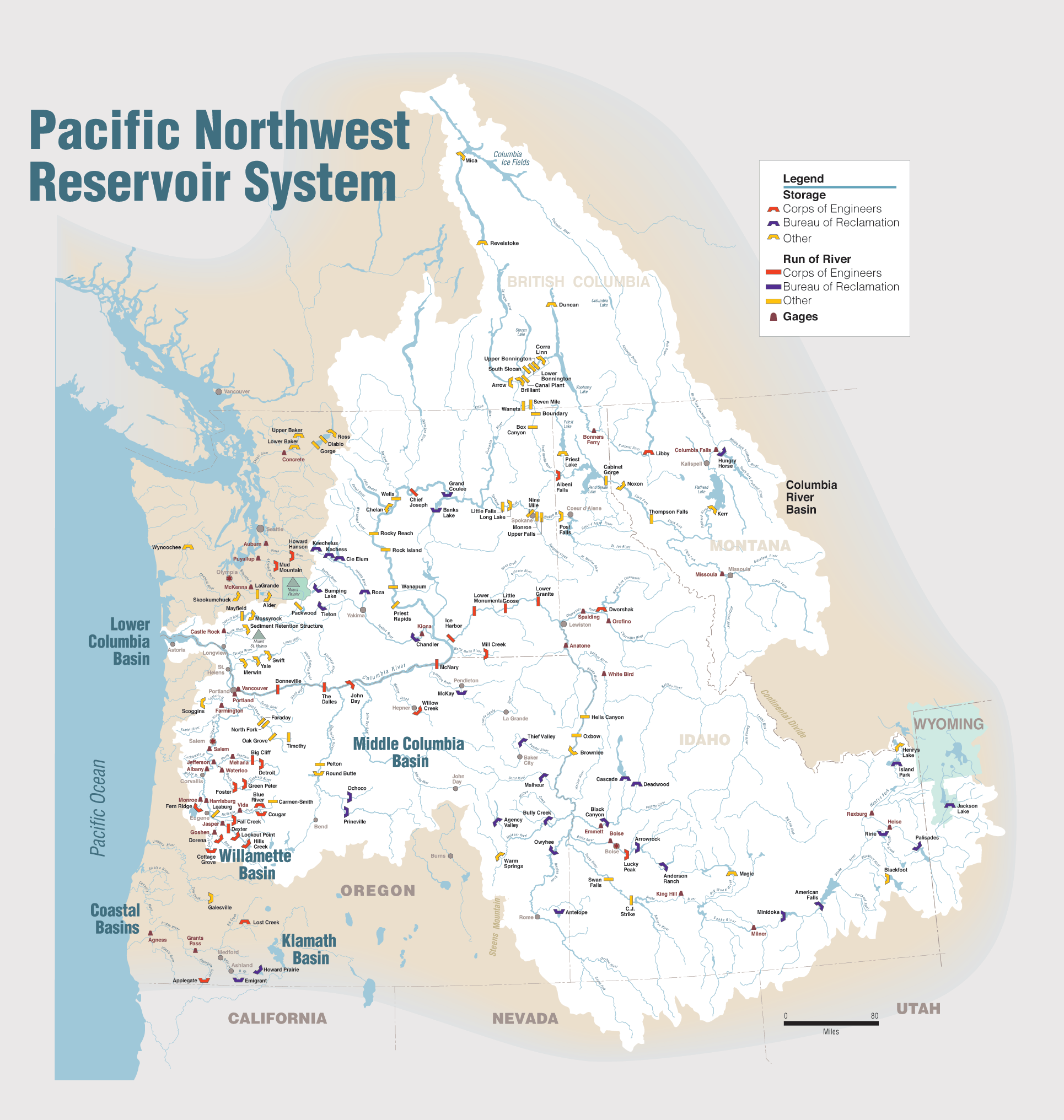
Pacific Northwest River System

Hugh Keenleyside Dam (formerly known as the High Arrow Dam) is a flood control dam spanning the Columbia River, 12 km (6.5 miles) upstream of the city of Castlegar, British Columbia, Canada.

== Dam ==
The dam is at the outflow of what was the upper and lower Arrow Lakes; today the two lakes are joined forming one long reservoir extending 232 km (144 mi) north to Revelstoke Dam, and contains 8.76 km^{3} (7.1 MAF) of reservoir volume. The dam is operated by BC Hydro.

The 853.4 m (2,800 ft) long earth fill and concrete dam was built as part of fulfilling Canada's obligations under the Columbia River Treaty, along with the Duncan Dam, both were built to prevent flooding and control the flow of water in the Columbia River for downstream hydroelectric dams. It was commissioned on October 10, 1968, six months ahead of schedule.

Immediately downstream of the dam a 185 megawatt (MW) hydroelectric powerhouse, the Arrow Lakes Generating Station, began construction in 1999 and was completed in 2002. The station is owned by the Columbia Power Corporation.

Lower Arrow Lake was raised 12 metres (40 feet) above the natural levels, resulting in several towns being dismantled and relocated before their sites were flooded, including Burton. Arrowhead, British Columbia is another ghost town, now submerged.

The dam was named after Hugh Llewellyn Keenleyside, the Canadian ambassador to Mexico, 1944–1947. Hugh Keenleyside served as the chairman of the British Columbia Power Commission and co-chairman at the British Columbia Hydro and Power Authority from 1962 to 1969.

The Arrow Lakes reservoir is described by BC Hydro as a "great waterway for boating", despite the effect that the 20 m (66 ft) difference between high and low water has on docks and ramps. The dam is equipped with a navigation lock - the only such lock west of Manitoba - which is available at no charge to boaters. However, commercial traffic and floating logs have priority over leisure craft.

== See also ==
- Hydroelectric dams on the Columbia River
- List of dams in the Columbia River watershed
- Mica Dam
- Revelstoke Dam
- List of generating stations in BC
