= FortisBC =

Natural gas and electric utility in British Columbia, Canada

- Type: Subsidiary
- Industry: Natural Gas, Electricity
- Headquarters: Kelowna and Surrey, British Columbia, Canada
- Key people: Roger Dall’Antonia, president and chief executive officer
- Parent: Fortis Inc.
- Website: www.fortisbc.com

FortisBC is a British Columbia-based regulated utility that provides natural gas and electricity. It is a wholly owned subsidiary of Fortis Inc. FortisBC has approximately 2,600 employees serving more than 1.2 million customers in 135 B.C. communities and 58 First Nations communities across 150 Traditional Territories.

Two separate utilities do business as FortisBC. The larger of the two is a gas utility (FortisBC Energy Inc.) that serves more than 1,054,000 gas customers across British Columbia. FortisBC owns and operates approximately 50,500 kilometres of gas transmission and distribution pipelines. The other is an electricity utility (FortisBC Inc.) that serves close to 185,000 customers directly in communities in the province's Southern Interior. The company owns and operates approximately 7,300 kilometres of transmission and distribution power lines.

FortisBC owns and operates two liquefied natural gas storage facilities and four regulated hydroelectric generating plants. FortisBC Inc. and FortisBC Energy Inc. use the FortisBC name and logo under license from Fortis Inc.

Both utilities are regulated by the British Columbia Utilities Commission (BCUC).

== Company history ==
=== FortisBC Energy Inc. (natural gas) ===
FortisBC Energy Inc. is a subsidiary of Fortis Inc., a Canadian, investor-owned corporation.

- 1952: Inland Natural Gas was incorporated to distribute natural gas throughout the interior of British Columbia. The company purchased St. John Oil and Gas, Peace River Transmission, Canadian Northern Oil and Gas, and Grand Prairie Transmission.
- 1980s: Inland Natural Gas purchased the Lower Mainland gas division from BC Hydro and changed its name to BC Gas, serving 546,000 customers in 70 communities across BC.
- 2002: BC Gas became the dominant distributor of natural gas in British Columbia by purchasing Centra Gas BC Inc. and Centra Gas Whistler Inc., adding 75,000 natural gas customers on the Sunshine Coast and Vancouver Island, and 2,000 piped propane customers in Whistler.
- 2003: BC Gas Inc. became Terasen Inc.
- 2005: Terasen Inc. was acquired by Kinder Morgan
- May 17, 2007: Fortis Inc. acquired Terasen Gas from Kinder Morgan
- 2011: the Terasen group of companies – Terasen Gas Inc., Terasen Gas (Vancouver Island) Inc., Terasen Gas (Whistler) Inc. – become FortisBC Energy Inc.

=== FortisBC Inc. (electricity) ===
FortisBC Inc. is a subsidiary of Fortis Inc., a Canadian, investor-owned corporation.

- 1897: West Kootenay Power and Light Company Ltd. were incorporated by act of parliament
- 1916: WKP was purchased by Cominco.
- 1986: Teck Resources Ltd. acquired a significant stake in Cominco. The two companies merged in 2001.
- September 1, 1988 – West Kootenay Power and Light Company, LTD became West Kootenay Power, Ltd.
- October 22, 2001: West Kootenay Power Ltd. was acquired by Utilicorp Networks Canada (British Columbia) Ltd.
- May 31, 2002: Utilicorp Networks Canada (British Columbia) Ltd. became Aquila Networks Canada (British Columbia) Ltd.
- September 2003: Fortis Inc. acquired Aquila’s Alberta and BC distribution and retail assets for $1.4 billion, including a large section of the Alberta transmission grid that Aquila had purchased from TransAlta for $600 million in 2000.
- June 1, 2004 - Aquila Networks Canada (British Columbia) Ltd. became FortisBC Inc.

== Liquefied Natural Gas (LNG) Production and Sales ==
FortisBC is the owner and operator of two LNG facilities in British Columbia.

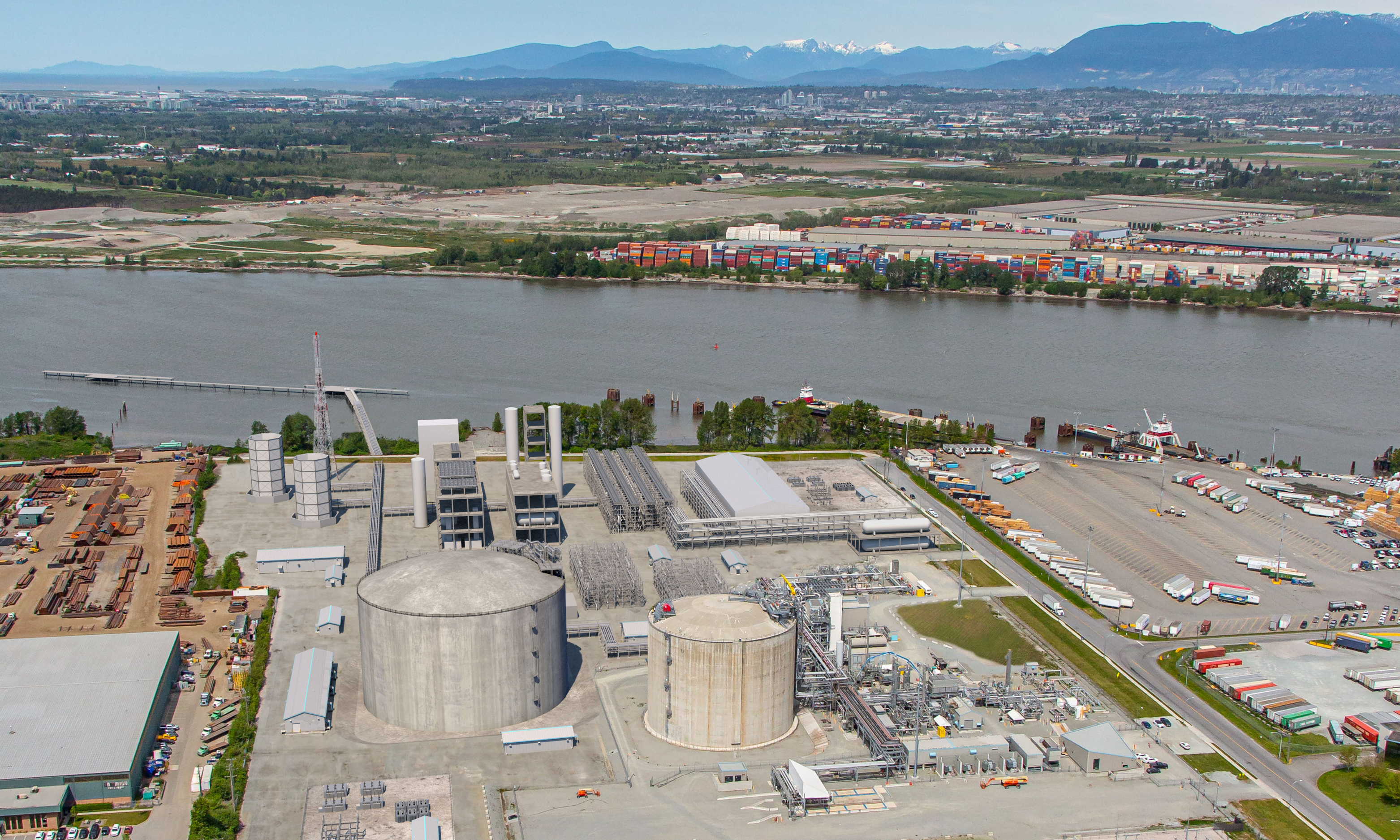
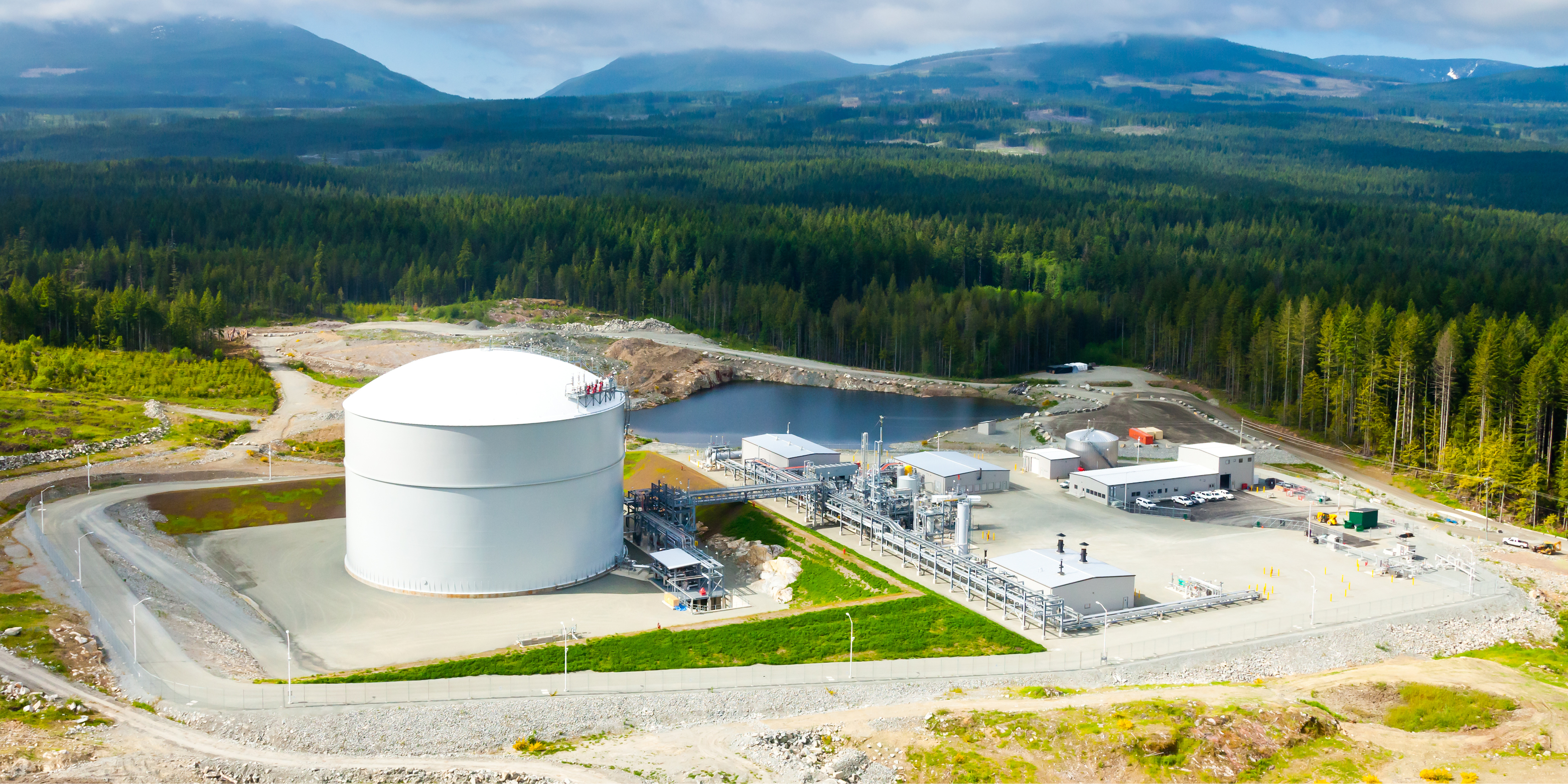
Top: Tilbury LNG plant. Bottom: Mt. Hayes Facility

=== Tilbury LNG plant ===
FortisBC’s Tilbury facility was Canada’s first LNG facility and has provided LNG since 1971. Built originally to ensure energy supply during high winter demand, Tilbury now also provides LNG for the marine transportation industry and small-scale exports via ISO containers. As demand for LNG as a marine fuel grows, the company is also working with the Vancouver Fraser Port Authority to develop the first ship-to-ship LNG marine refuelling service on the west coast of North America. This facility holds up to 74,000 cubic metres of LNG and is also the first in Canada to produce LNG for export overseas. A lifecycle greenhouse gas emissions (GHG) analysis from environmental consultant, Sphera, found the Tilbury facility produces LNG with nearly 30 per cent less carbon intensity than the global LNG supply, on average.

FortisBC plans to expand its Tilbury facility. FortisBC claims the proposed Tilbury Phase 2 LNG Expansion Project would improve the resiliency of the gas system. The proposed project includes the construction of a new storage tank that can hold up to 162,000 cubic metres of LNG, potentially tripling Tilbury’s current storage capacity. The proposed project would also contain a new liquefaction unit with a capacity of 3.5 million tonnes per year to produce LNG.

=== Mt. Hayes facility ===
FortisBC's 20-hectare Mt. Hayes facility is located approximately six kilometres northwest of Ladysmith. It opened in 2011. The storage facility is supplied by FortisBC’s existing pipeline systems and has a roughly 70,000m3 capacity to store liquefied natural gas. This project is a joint venture with the Stz'uminus First Nation.

== Hydroelectric generating plants ==
FortisBC owns four hydroelectric generating plants on the Kootenay River with a total capacity of 225 megawatts (MW). They are the Corra Linn, Upper Bonnington, Lower Bonnington and South Slocan plants.

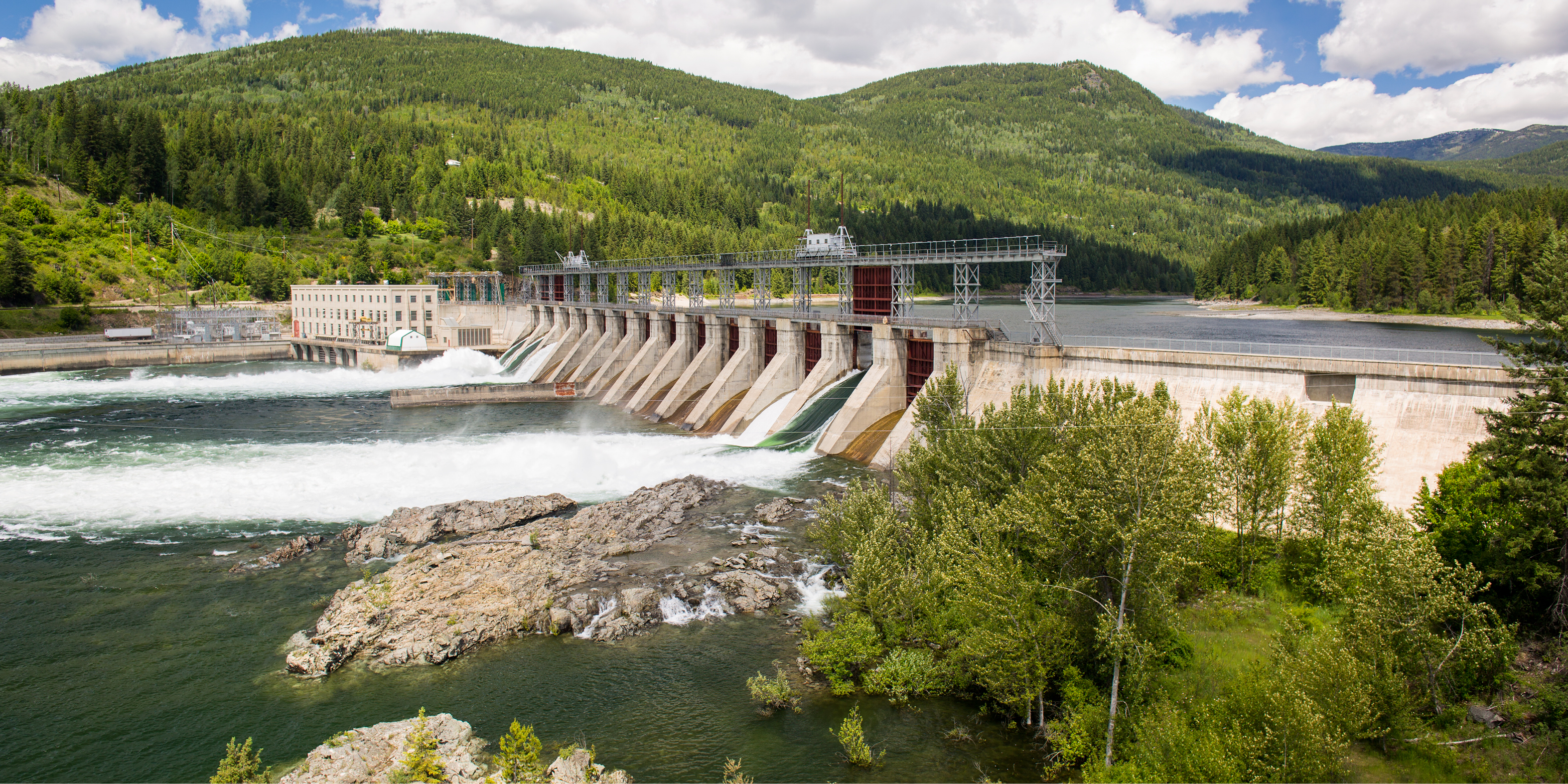
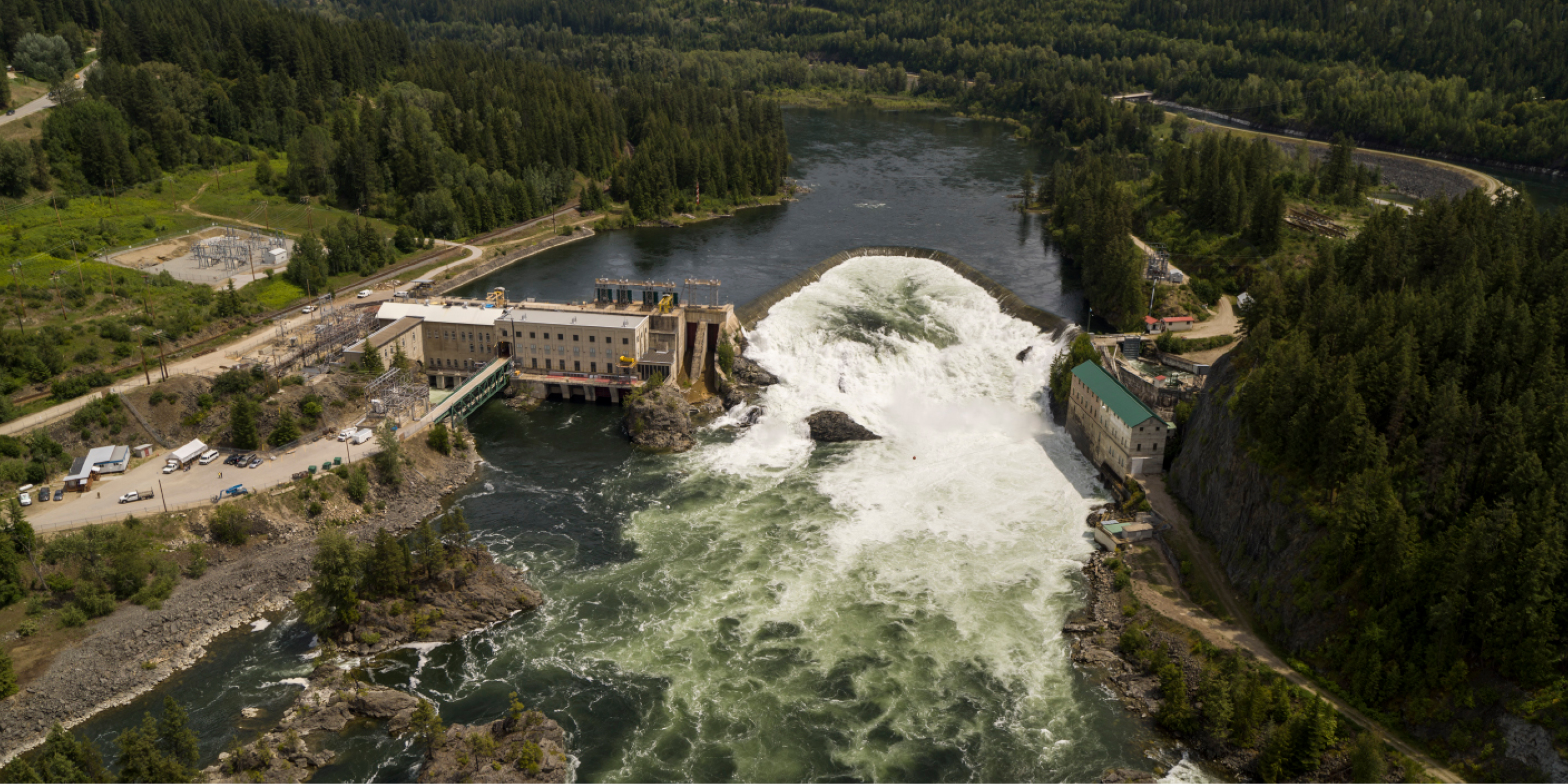
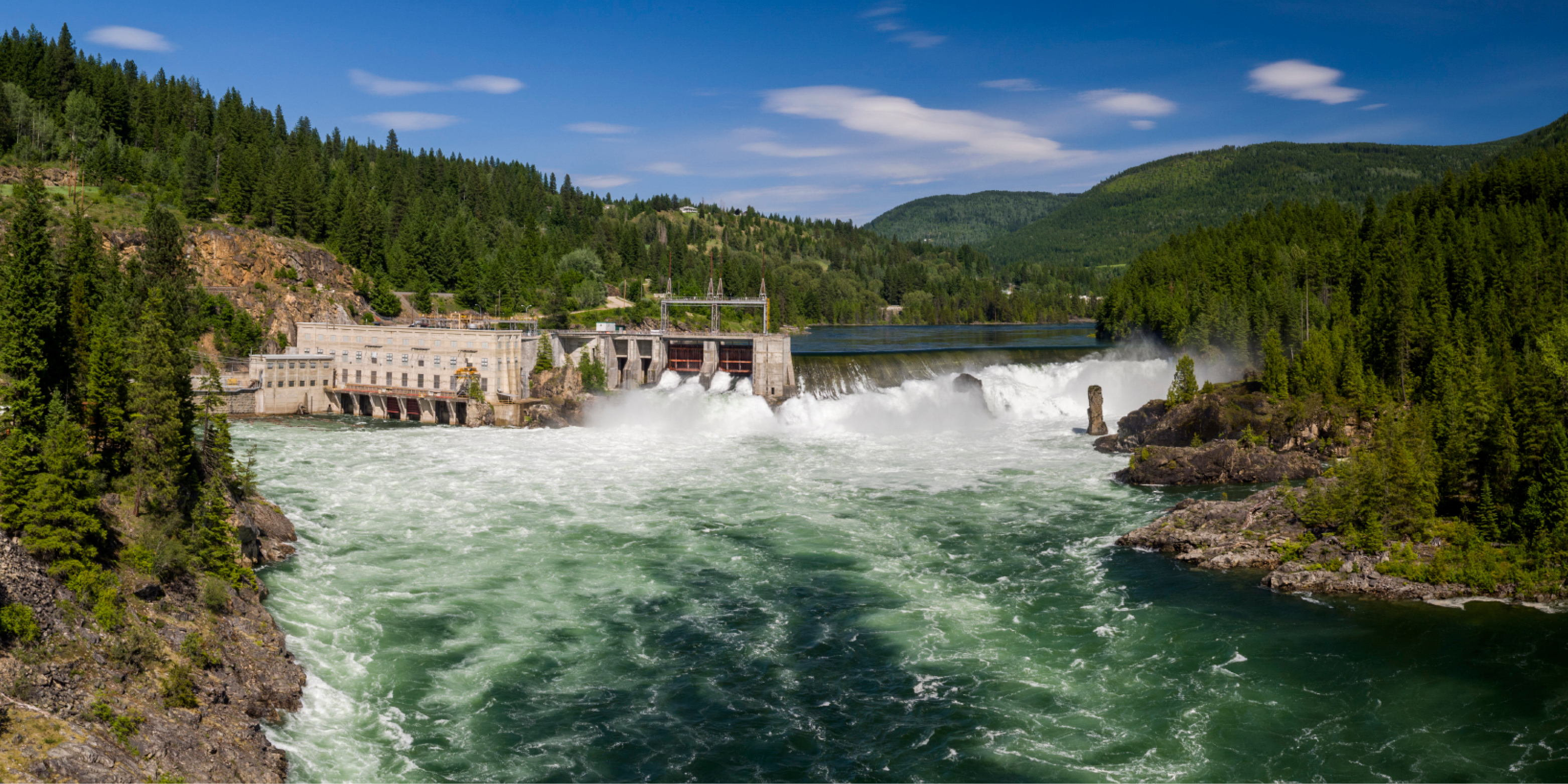
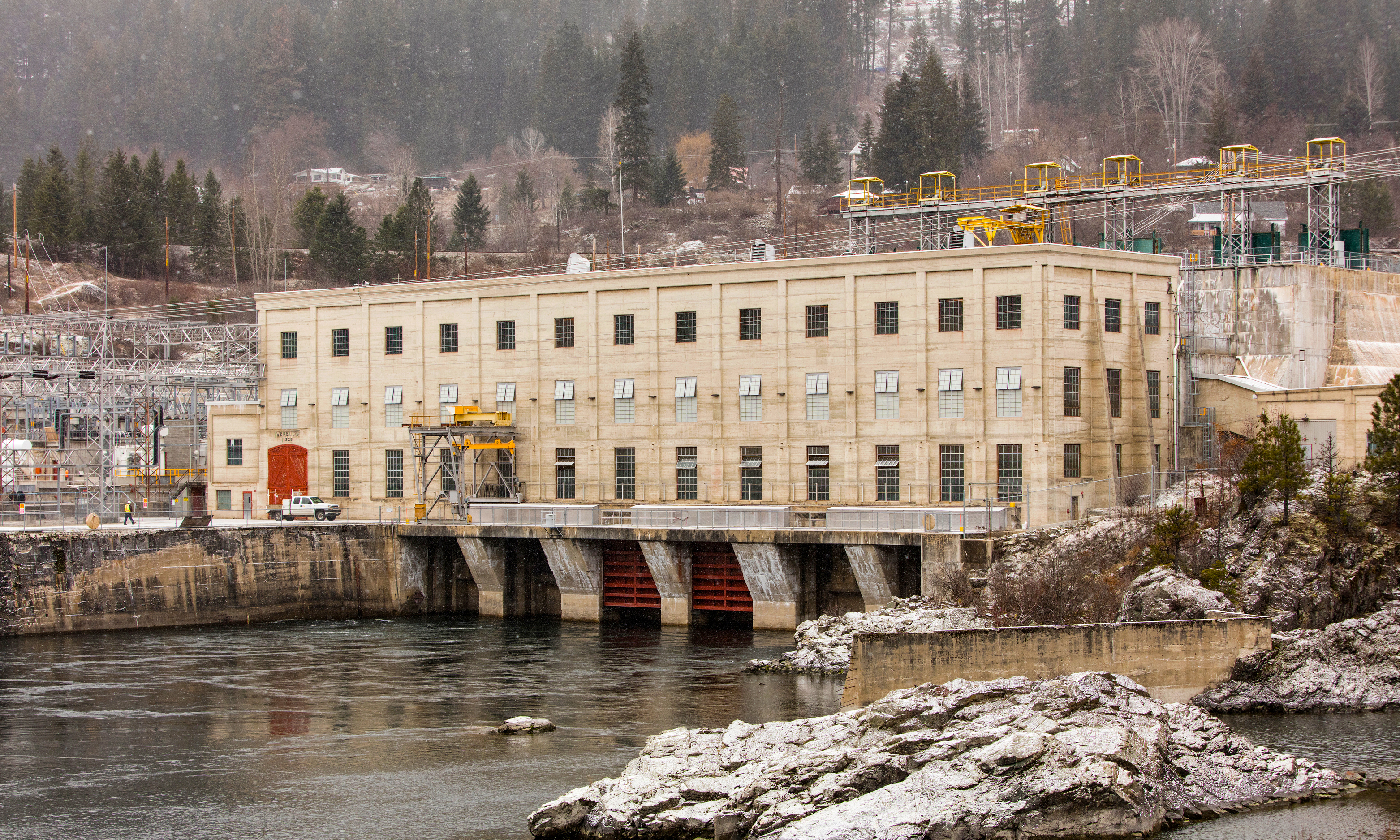
From top to bottom: The Corra Linn Dam, the Upper Bonnington Generating Plant, the Lower Bonnington Dam, and the South Slocan Dam.

=== Corra Linn ===
The Corra Linn Dam was built in 1932 to control upstream storage by raising Kootenay Lake and generating power through three 19,000 horsepower units operating under the depth of water behind the dam of approximately 16 metres. The aggregate generating capacity is 51 MW. The Corra Linn Dam is located on the Kootenay River, approximately 15 km (9.3 mi) downstream of the City of Nelson on British Columbia Highway 3A.

=== Upper Bonnington ===
The Upper Bonnington Generating Plant consists of six hydroelectric units in two adjacent powerhouses, a 15-metre-high concrete gravity dam, a powerhouse with two sections, a gated spillway and an overflow spillway. The original powerhouse was built in 1907, upgraded in 1916 and extended again in 1939 for a total rated capacity of 65 MW. The Upper Bonnington Dam is located on the Kootenay River, approximately 17 km (11 mi) downstream of the City of Nelson. Also at the same Bonnington Falls location, but on the other side of the river is the City of Nelson Powerhouse in operation since 1907. In 2018, the publication Hydro Review inducted the plant into their Hydro Hall of Fame, a program that recognizes extraordinary hydro power achievement throughout the world, with a special emphasis on long-lasting facilities.

=== Lower Bonnington ===
The Lower Bonnington Dam is composed of a powerhouse behind an intake dam on the right bank of the Kootenay River and a concrete gravity structure approximately 18 metres high. The original dam built in 1897 consisted of a rock-filled timber crib dam that straddled the river upstream of the falls at this site. In 1924, the dam was demolished and replaced with a new, larger plant that included three units that increased aggregate generating capacity to 54 MW. It was then reconstructed in 1964. The Lower Bonnington Dam is located on the Kootenay River approximately 18 km southwest of Nelson, BC.

=== South Slocan ===
The South Slocan Dam was commissioned in 1928 and has an aggregate generating capacity of 54 MW. The South Slocan Dam is located on the Kootenay River, near South Slocan, 20 km southwest of Nelson on British Columbia Highway 3A.

=== Generation plant operations ===
FortisBC also operates and maintains five generating plants owned by others, with a total generating capacity of 1,322 MW:

- Waneta Expansion Project, which is owned by Columbia Power Corporation and Columbia Basin Trust
- Waneta Dam, which is owned by Teck and BC Hydro
- Arrow Lakes Generating Station, which is owned by Columbia Power Corporation
- Brilliant Dam and Brilliant Expansion, which are owned by Columbia Power Corporation and Columbia Basin Trust

== Energy offerings ==
FortisBC offers compressed natural gas (CNG), liquified natural gas (LNG), renewable natural gas (RNG), propane gas, and electricity gained from hydroelectric facilities.

FortisBC is the largest distributor of natural gas, RNG and piped propane in British Columbia, serving more than 1,054,000 natural gas customers in British Columbia. It delivers piped propane to customers in Revelstoke, BC.

The company operates approximately 50,500 km of natural gas transmission and distribution pipelines and has 11 compressor stations. The distribution network includes several underwater pipeline crossings, including under the Columbia and Fraser rivers and the Strait of Georgia.

The Whistler natural gas line was built in conjunction with the Sea to Sky Highway Improvement Project, which was completed for the Vancouver-Whistler 2010 Winter Olympic Games. The natural gas line falls mainly within the highway right of way and brings natural gas to the Resort Municipality of Whistler, which was formerly served by propane.

=== Liquefied natural gas in the marine sector ===
FortisBC’s Tilbury LNG facility services marine vessels. FortisBC claims that the use of LNG by marine vessels can reduce emissions GHG emissions by up to 27%, particulate matter by up to 99%, nitrogen oxides by up to 95%, and sulphur oxides by almost 100%.

=== Electricity ===
FortisBC operates an electric vehicle (EV) charging network in the South Okanagan and Kootenay regions. In 2021, it opened 10 new stations, giving EV drivers access to highway-grade charging infrastructure. As of April 2023, FortisBC has a total of 42 EV charging stations across 22 sites.

=== Renewable Natural Gas ===
In June 2011, FortisBC launched a Renewable Natural Gas (RNG) program for customers in the Lower Mainland, Fraser Valley, Interior and the Kootenays. This program collects methane from farms and landfills and mixes it into existing natural gas infrastructure. FortisBC customers can opt into the program and request that up to 100% of their natural gas come from the RNG program.

In 2020, BCUC approved FortisBC’s request to purchase RNG from suppliers outside of BC. The company has signed agreements with RNG suppliers in Alberta and Ontario and the United States. In 2021, FortisBC had signed a total of 30 supply agreements to purchase RNG both in and out of BC. As of 2024, this program provided 2.8 PJ of RNG when compared to 230 PJ or natural gas provided by the company, or 1.2% of the total gas supplied by energy use.

FortisBC RNG Purchases by Year
Year	RNG Purchases (PJ)
2020	0.25
2021	0.71
2022	2.3
2023	2.8
2024	2.8

FortisBC sells RNG through both a voluntary program and a mandatory program. Customers who use the voluntary program pay $13.22/GJ of RNG that they purchase. The mandatory program began in July 2024 at a mandatory 1% blend. As of 2025, every customer is allocated 3% RNG and being charged via a biomethane rate rider on their bill.

=== Propane ===
FortisBC delivers piped propane to around 1,500 residential and commercial customers in Revelstoke, BC. The piped propane system was first introduced to Revelstoke in 1991 because the city was located too great of a distance from the natural gas distribution system. Currently, propane is supplied to Revelstoke by railcars and tanker trucks, where it is offloaded into storage tanks, vaporized as needed, and distributed to customers through an underground piped distribution system.

== Allegations of misinformation and greenwashing ==
On March 3, 2022, a government-industry study commissioned by Fortis BC., the B.C. Ministry of Energy, Mines and Low Carbon Innovation, and the BC Bioenergy Network was released. This document was then edited 9 days later to remove several paragraphs that portrayed natural gas unfavorably. Sections removed included an assertion that electric heat pumps were “six to eight times more efficient than heating with gas” as well as other claims regarding a predicted decline in future pipeline sales. A FOIPPA request from Glacer Media showed that those paragraphs were removed after release on demand of FortisBC’s strategic advisor for climate change and energy, Tyler Bryant, who claimed that he was frustrated with "how you guys are trying to expand the scope of the study". A FortisBC spokesperson and BC Bioenergy Network's director Scott Stanners both confirmed that the removal had occurred as a result of the study's steering committee judging the information out of scope.

Richmond city officials had noticed the removal in November of that year, with the city's director of sustainability and district energy accusing FortisBC of "manufacturing a conversation that suits its long-term goals.". These accusations were echoed by Richmond city counsellor Michael Wolfe and Nanaimo city counselor Ben Geselbracht, the latter of whom accused the report of lying by omission, a claim vehemently denied by Stanners.

In September 2022, a complaint was filed with the Canada Competition Bureau against the Canadian Gas Association claiming that the industry's positioning of natural gas as being eco-friendly was "false and misleading". FortisBC, a member of the Canadian Gas Association, was accused by journalists of promoting similar claims, amongst other allegations of misleading information and "greenwashing".

== Energy efficiency and conservation programs ==
FortisBC is mandated to provide conservation and energy efficiency programs to customers, helping them lower energy use and reduce GHG emissions. In April 2009, FortisBC implemented a $41.5 million energy efficiency and conservation program after receiving approval from the BCUC to use those funds from 2009 to 2010. In November 2009, the BCUC approved an extension of the program until the end of 2011, and increased allowed expenditures by approximately $38.5 million. FortisBC continues to provide millions in funding and incentives every year to help British Columbians use less energy and save money.

Customers upgrading to high-efficiency residential appliances and equipment such as furnaces, water heaters and fireplaces can receive a rebate to reduce the cost of choosing high-efficiency models. There are similar programs and offers available to commercial and industrial customers to encourage the transition to higher efficiency equipment. In addition, additional funding is provided for energy efficiency education to help encourage customer behaviour changes to reduce energy consumption.

In 2019, the BCUC approved FortisBC’s request to expand its overall energy-efficiency investment to $368.5 million over the 2019–2022 period. The request formed part of FortisBC’s 2019-2022 Demand Side Management Applications for both its natural gas and electricity operations. This represents the largest funding approval FortisBC has received to date for its energy efficiency initiatives.

In 2021, FortisBC invested close to $120 million in these conservation and energy efficiency programs, helping more British Columbians upgrade to high-efficiency natural gas and electricity equipment. Improving energy efficiency in homes and businesses can help customers reduce monthly bills and lower GHG emissions.

== See also ==
- List of dams in the Columbia River watershed
- Columbia Power Corporation
- List of power stations in British Columbia
- Princeton Light & Power
