= Waneta Dam =

- Coordinates: 49.0041°N 117.6116°W
- Opening date: 1954
- Owner(s): BC Hydro
- Operator(s): Teck Resources, BC Hydro

Dam and spillways
- Impounds: Pend d'Oreille
- Height: 76 metres (249 ft)

Power Station
- Installed capacity: 490 MW
- Capacity factor: 46.1%
- Annual generation: 1.98 TWh (7.1 PJ)

The Waneta Dam is a concrete gravity-type hydroelectric dam on the Pend d'Oreille River in the Canadian province of British Columbia. It lies 9.5 kilometres (6 mi) downstream of Seven Mile Dam at the Pend d'Oreille's confluence with the Columbia River. It is located about 12.5 kilometres (8 mi) southeast of Trail and 0.35 kilometres (0.2 mi) north of the U.S. border at Washington.

It supplies electric power to Teck Resources metallurgical operations at Trail, British Columbia and for BC Hydro which since 2010 has a 1/3 ownership of the facility. As of 2018 BC Hydro owns 100% of the generating stn It is located near the mouth of the Pend d'Oreille River just before it empties into the Columbia River, slightly north of the Canada–United States border.

== BC Hydro Purchase ==
In 2010, BC Hydro purchased a one-third interest in the Waneta Dam from Teck Resources for a price of $825 million.

On August 1, 2017, BC Hydro announced its intention to purchase the remaining two-thirds interest in the dam from Teck for a price of $1.2 billion. Teck's Trail, British Columbia smelter will continue to use two-thirds of the electricity generated by the dam, continuing the terms of the previous agreement.

In July 2018, the sale of the remaining two thirds interest from Teck to BC Hydro was finalized for $1.2 billion.

== Waneta Expansion ==
Construction of a separate two-unit powerplant commenced in Winter of 2010/11 to increase the dam's generating capacity by an additional 335 megawatts. This project, Waneta Expansion, is a partnership, with Fortis Inc. holding a 51% share in the project and the two Crown agencies Columbia Power Corporation and Columbia Basin Trust holding a 32.5% and 16.5% share, respectively. SNC-Lavalin designed and built the project which came online in 2015.

== See also ==
- List of dams in the Columbia River watershed
- List of generating stations in BC
