= McMahon Cogeneration Plant =

- Country: Canada
- Location: Taylor, British Columbia
- Coordinates: 56°8′53″N 120°40′3″W
- Status: Operational
- Commission date: 1993
- Owners: TransAlta, NorthRiver Midstream
- Operator: NorthRiver Midstream

Thermal power station
- Primary fuel: Natural gas
- Cogeneration?: Yes

Power generation
- Units operational: 2
- Make and model: Westinghouse W251B12
- Nameplate capacity: 120 MW

McMahon Cogeneration Plant is a natural gas power station owned by TransAlta (50%) and NorthRiver Midstream (50%). The plant is located in Taylor, British Columbia. The plant supplies steam to a gas processing plant owned by NorthRiver Midstream and generates electricity for the British Columbia grid through a long-term power sale agreement with BC Hydro.

== Description ==
The plant consists of:

- Two Westinghouse CW251B12 gas turbines
- Two Deltak heat recovery steam generators
