= Duncan Dam =

Coordinates: 50°15′6″N 116°56′47″W

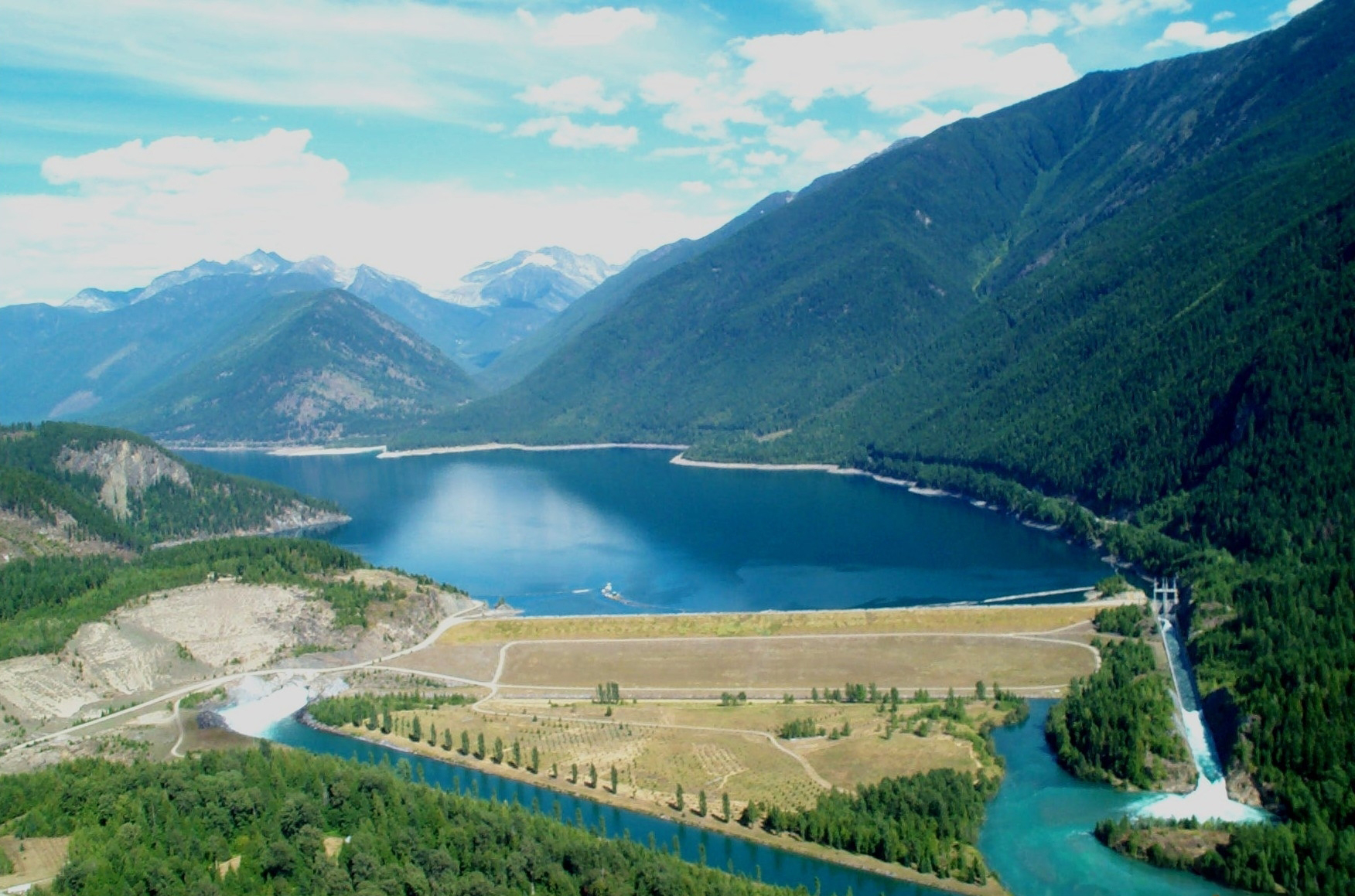
- Opening date: 1967

Reservoir
- Creates: Duncan Lake
- Total capacity: 1,400,000 acre-feet (1.7 km^{3})

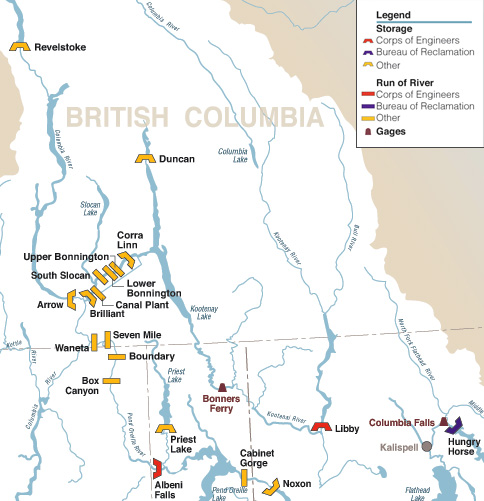
Map highlighting major dams and reservoirs in the Kootenay River watershed and surrounds

Duncan Dam is a dam spanning the Duncan River in the Canadian province of British Columbia.

Duncan Dam was the first dam built to satisfy the Columbia River Treaty, initiated after the 1948 flood along the lower Columbia, which proved fatal at Vanport City, Oregon and other locations. Construction began in 1965, and was completed in 1967. It is an earthfill dam with no power generation facilities. It was built as a storage facility, controlling the flow of water from the Duncan River into the Kootenay Lake reservoir.

The reservoir's storage is over 50% greater than Kootenay Lake. The reservoir is usually filled by August. The Duncan river drainage basin is 2,400 square kilometers. The dam regulates 10% of the water in the Kootenay River basin. Duncan Dam and Libby Dam together ensure operational water levels for the Kootenay Canal and Corra Linn Dam projects. Duncan Dam is owned and operated by BC Hydro.
