= Columbia Power Corporation =

Crown corporation in British Columbia, Canada

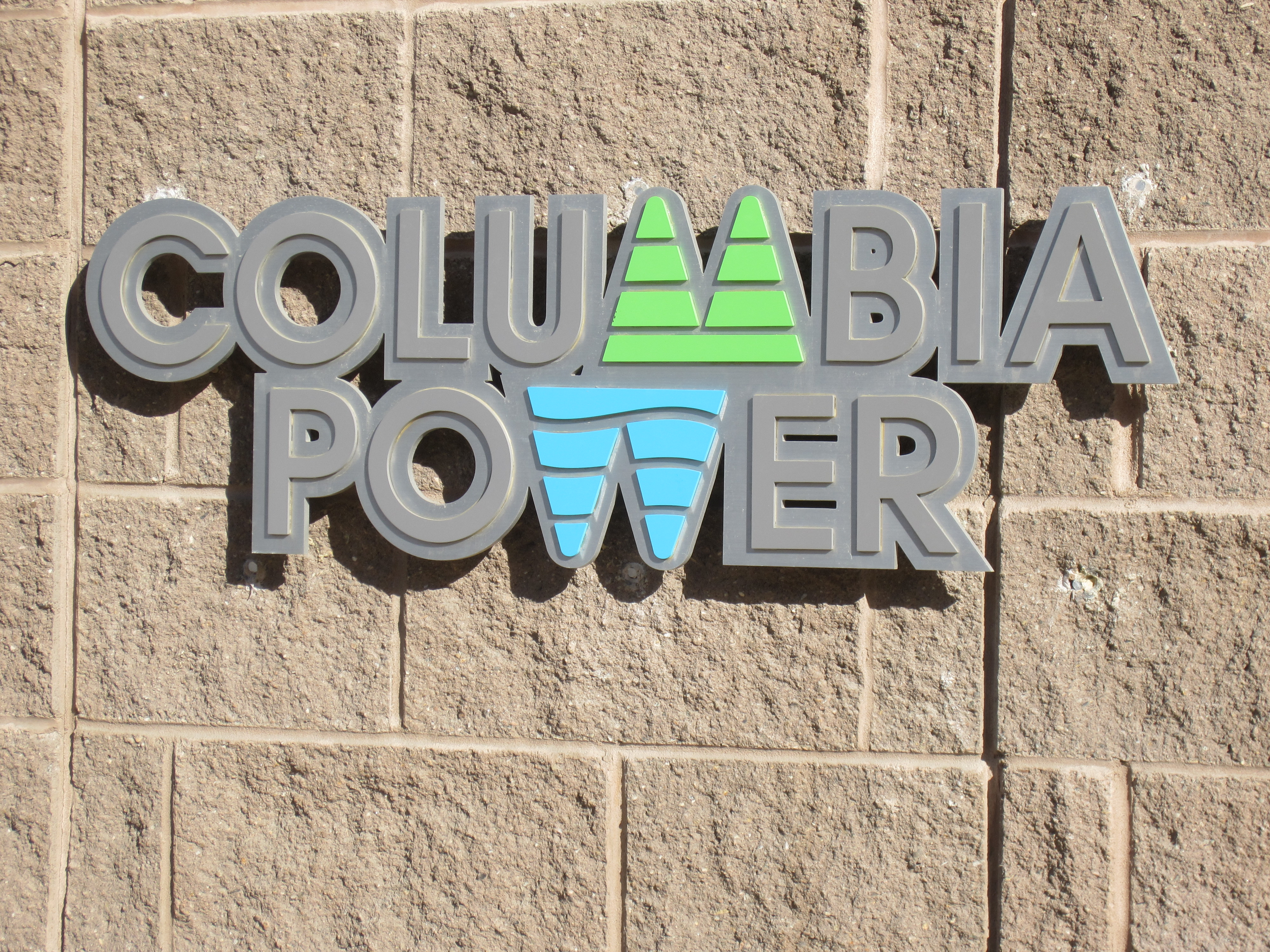
Columbia Power logo on the headquarters building, Castlegar British Columbia

Columbia Power Corporation is a Crown Corporation, owned by the province of British Columbia, Canada. Its mandate is to undertake hydro-electricity projects in the Columbia River region of British Columbia. In so doing, it is required to work with its sister crown corporation the Columbia Basin Trust.

Its assets include:

- Brilliant Dam 145 MW purchased from Teck Cominco in 1996
- Brilliant Expansion 120 MW
- Arrow Lakes Generating Station 185 MW
- Partnered with FortisBC at Waneta Expansion 335 MW
