= List of crossings of the Kootenay River =

This is a list of bridges and other crossings of the Kootenay River from its source downstream to the Columbia River.

== Crossings ==
Crossing	Carries	Location	Coordinates	Image
Kootenay Crossing Bridge	Highway 93	Kootenay Crossing, British Columbia (Kootenay National Park)	50°53′13″N 116°02′44″W	
Canal Flats Bridge	Highway 93 / Highway 95	Canal Flats, British Columbia	50°08′52″N 115°48′03″W	
Springbrook Bridge	Highway 93 / Highway 95	Skookumchuck, British Columbia	49°54′39″N 115°44′14″W	
Wasa Bridge	Highway 93 / Highway 95	Near Wasa, British Columbia	49°48′34″N 115°46′02″W	
Fort Steele Bridge	Highway 93 / Highway 95	Fort Steele, British Columbia	49°36′45″N 115°38′04″W	
Wardner Bridge	Highway 3 / Highway 93	Near Wardner, British Columbia	49°26′00″N 115°25′21″W	
Highway Bridge	Kikomun-Newgate Road	near Kikomun Creek Provincial Park, British Columbia	49°15′37″N 115°16′22″W	
Kootenay crosses Canada-U.S. border (as Lake Koocanusa impoundment)
Libby Dam		Near Jennings, Montana	48°24′35″N 115°18′53″W	
Lake Koocanusa Bridge	MT 37	Near Jennings, Montana	48°21′57″N 115°19′31″W	
Highway Bridge	MT 37	Libby, Montana	48°23′48″N 115°32′52″W	
Kootenai Falls Swinging Bridge	Footbridge	Kootenai Falls, Montana	48°27′12″N 115°46′17″W	
Theodore Roosevelt Memorial Bridge	Roosevelt Parkway	Troy, Montana	48°28′12″N 115°53′11″W	
Kootenai River Bridge	US 2	Troy, Montana	48°29′42″N 115°55′04″W	
Highway Bridge	Leona Road	Near Leona, Idaho (In Montana near MT-ID border.)	48°37′02″N 116°02′54″W	
Bonner's Ferry Bridge	US 2 / US 95	Bonners Ferry, Idaho	48°41′59″N 116°18′48″W	
Kootenay crosses U.S.-Canada border
Kootenay River Bridge	Highway 3	Near Creston, British Columbia	49°07′02″N 116°34′50″W	
Kootenay Lake Ferry	Highway 3A	Connecting Kootenay Bay and Balfour, British Columbia	49°39′07″N 116°54′41″W	
Harrop Cable Ferry		Harrop, British Columbia	49°36′34″N 117°03′15″W	
Nelson Bridge (Big Orange Bridge)	Highway 3A	Nelson, British Columbia	49°30′37″N 117°16′56″W	
Taghum Bridge	Highway 3A / Highway 6	Taghum, British Columbia	49°29′40″N 117°22′46″W	
Corra Linn Dam		Corra Linn, British Columbia	49°28′05″N 117°28′03″W	
Upper Bonnington Falls Dam		Bonnington Falls, British Columbia	49°27′32″N 117°29′09″W	
Lower Bonnington Falls Dam		Bonnington Falls, British Columbia	49°27′39″N 117°29′59″W	
	Blewett Road	Near South Slocan, British Columbia	49°27′32″N 117°30′33″W	
South Slocan Dam		Near South Slocan, British Columbia	49°27′23″N 117°31′05″W	
Glade Ferry		Tarry's, British Columbia	49°23′42″N 117°32′40″W	
Brilliant Dam		Near Brilliant, British Columbia	49°19′28″N 117°37′10″W	
Brilliant Suspension Bridge	Footbridge	Near Brilliant, British Columbia	49°19′03″N 117°37′47″W	
Brilliant Bridge	Highway 3A	Near Brilliant, British Columbia	49°19′00″N 117°37′52″W	
References: ACME Mapper

== See also ==
- List of crossings of the Columbia River
- List of British Columbia-related topics
- List of Montana-related topics
- List of Idaho-related topics
