= Kootenay River =

River in Western Canada and the United States

Kootenay River Kootenai River
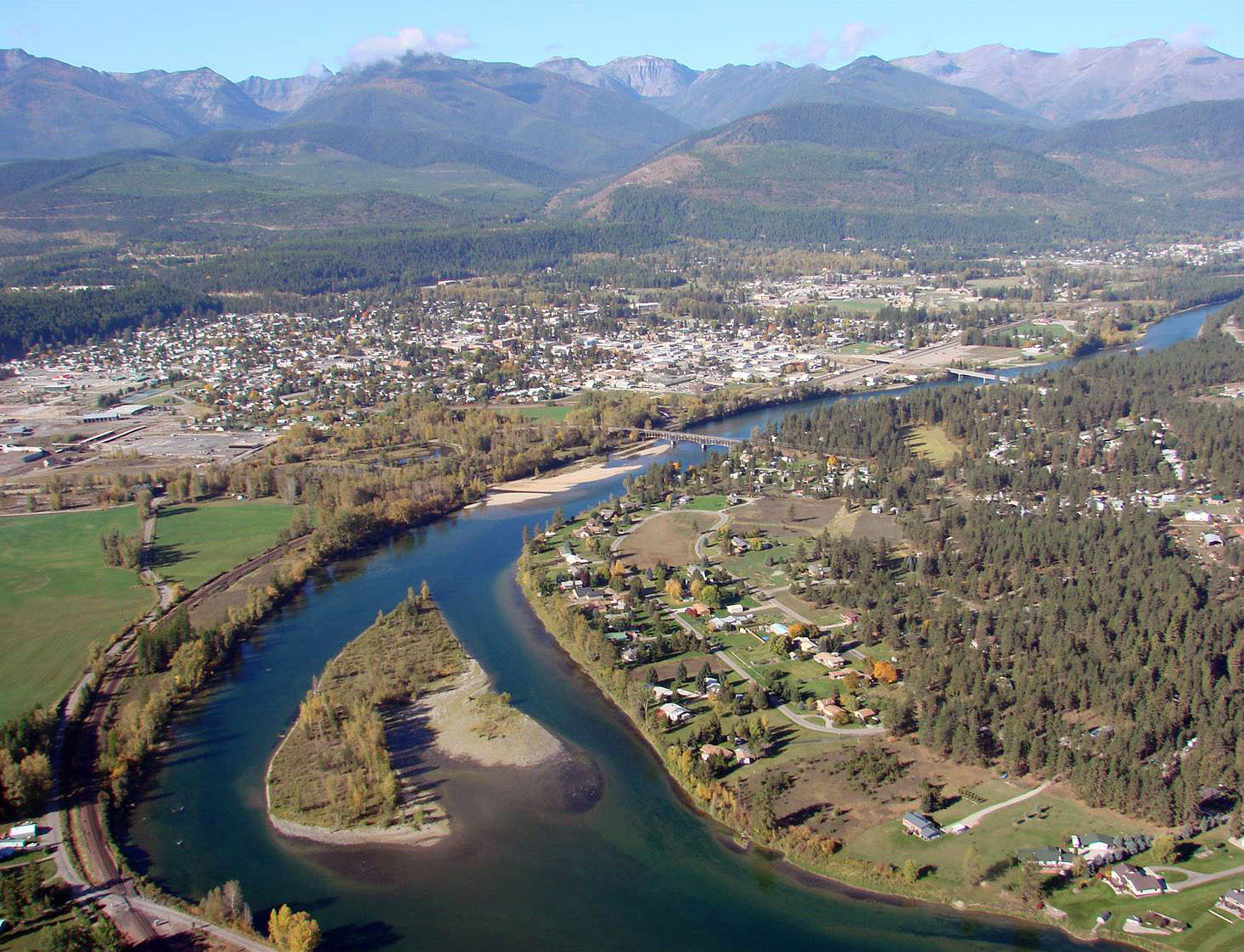
- The Kootenai River at Libby, Montana

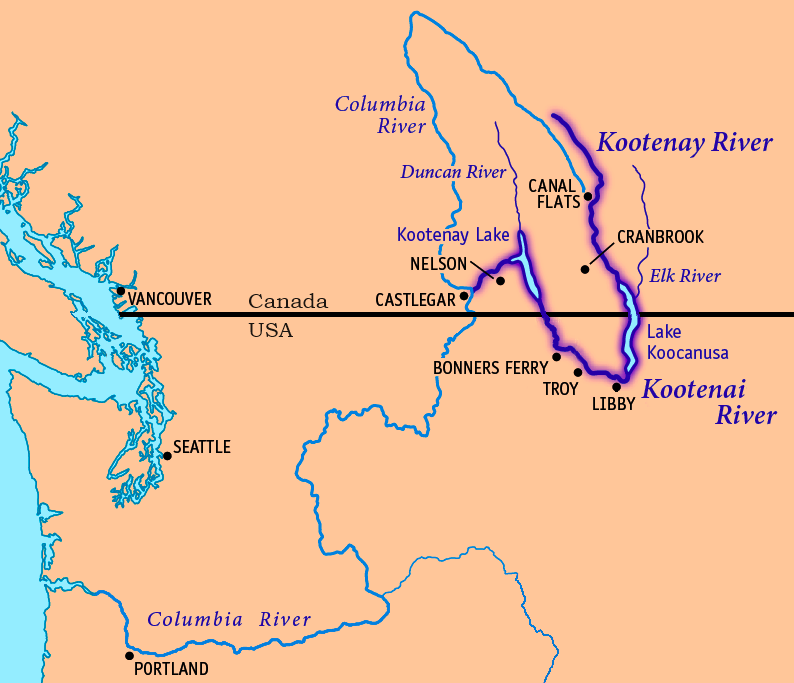
- Map of the Kootenay/Kootenai River, its main tributaries and lakes, and major cities.
- Native name: aqkinmiluk (Ktunaxa); aqkoktlaqatl (Ktunaxa)

Location
- Countries: Canada, United States
- Province: British Columbia
- States: Montana, Idaho

Physical characteristics
- Source: South flank of Castle Mountain
  - location: Mount Hungabee, Kootenay National Park, British Columbia, Canada
  - coordinates: 51°18′53.6″N 116°17′10.6″W
  - elevation: 2,261 m (7,418 ft)
- Mouth: Columbia River
  - location: Castlegar, British Columbia, Canada
  - coordinates: 49°19′0″N 117°39′4″W
  - elevation: 420 m (1,380 ft)
- Length: 780 km (480 mi)
- Basin size: 50,298 km^{2} (19,420 mi^{2})
- Discharge
  - location: Columbia River at Castlegar, BC (rates given for Kootenay Lake near Corra Linn Dam some 10 miles upstream)
  - average: 782 m^{3}/s (27,600 cu ft/s)
  - minimum: 104 m^{3}/s (3,700 cu ft/s)
  - maximum: 4,930 m^{3}/s (174,000 cu ft/s)

Basin features
- Tributaries
  - left: Palliser River, White River, Bull River, Elk River, Fisher River, Tobacco River, Lake Creek
  - right: St. Mary River, Yaak River, Moyie River, Goat River, Duncan River, Slocan River

The Kootenay River or Kootenai River is a major river of the Northwest Plateau in southeastern British Columbia, Canada, and northern Montana and Idaho in the United States. It is one of the uppermost major tributaries of the Columbia River, the largest North American river that empties into the Pacific Ocean. The Kootenay River runs 781 kilometres (485 mi) from its headwaters in the Kootenay Ranges of the Canadian Rockies, flowing from British Columbia's East Kootenay region into northwestern Montana, then west into the northernmost Idaho Panhandle and returning to British Columbia in the West Kootenay region, where it joins the Columbia at Castlegar.

The river is known as the "Kootenay" in Canada and by the Ktunaxa Nation, and as the "Kootenai" in the United States and by the Confederated Salish and Kootenai Tribes and Kootenai Tribe of Idaho. Fed mainly by glaciers and snowmelt, the river drains a rugged, sparsely populated region of more than 50,000 km^{2} (19,000 mi^{2}), of which over 70 percent is in Canada. From its headwaters to its confluence with the Columbia River, the Kootenay descends more than 2,000 metres (6,600 ft). At their confluence, the Columbia and Kootenay are similar in length, drainage area, and volume, but less of the Kootenay is impounded in reservoirs and thus it has more free-flowing stretches with rapids and falls. Part of the lower Kootenay forms Kootenay Lake, one of the largest natural lakes in British Columbia.

The Ktunaxa (Kootenai) were the first people to live along the Kootenay River. For hundreds of years, they hunted and fished on the river, quite isolated from neighboring tribes. In the 19th century, Canadian explorer David Thompson became the first recorded European to reach the Kootenay and established trading posts throughout the region. A gold rush followed by silver and galena strikes in the late 19th century drew thousands of miners and settlers to the region, bringing developments such as railroads and steamboat navigation. The Doukhobors, a Russian religious sect, established a short-lived colony, Brilliant, at the Kootenay's mouth; subsequently dispersing into many settlements, they contributed to the region's timber and agricultural industries.

As with many Pacific Northwest rivers, many dams were built on the Kootenay in the 20th century to generate electricity and protect against floods and droughts. Water levels of Kootenay Lake are artificially regulated, and numerous hydroelectric dams block the river between Kootenay Lake and the Columbia River. Upstream of Kootenay Lake, most of the river is free-flowing with the exception of the Libby Dam in Montana, which forms Lake Koocanusa.

== Name ==
The river was described with slightly different names by two groups of the local Ktunaxa (Kootenai) Indian tribes. These indigenous people who lived along the upper river knew it as aqkinmiluk, simply meaning "river". The people along the lower river called it aqkoktlaqatl, a name whose meaning is not certain. The name "Flatbow River" comes from the name the Blackfeet used to call the Ktunaxa, for their "powerful, stylish bows", and was later recorded by French-Canadian fur traders.

While searching for the ultimate source of the Columbia River, explorer David Thompson encountered Columbia Lake, where the Columbia River starts north as a small stream and the Kootenay rushes south, already a powerful river. Already knowing from earlier maps that the region included two rivers called the Columbia and the Kootenay, Thompson thought that what is now called the Columbia was the Kootenay, and he thought that he had not yet found the real Kootenay. Thence he applied the name "McGillivray's River" to the real Kootenay in honor of his trading partners William and Duncan McGillivray. In his writings, the Columbia from Columbia Lake to the Big Bend was called the Kootenae.

The name "Kootenai" was also used by French Canadians to refer to the Ktunaxa in the 19th century. "Kootenai" is thought to be a word meaning "water people" in an Algonquian language. The river is still referred to as Kootenai in the United States, while in Canada it is spelled Kootenay.

Comparisons of various U.S. Geological Survey (USGS) topographic maps from the 20th century show many misinterpretations or alternative names being applied to the segment of the river within the United States. These include "Kootanie", "Kootenie", and "Kootienay". The Geographic Names Information System of the USGS lists "Swan River" as an alternate name, although the origin of this name is uncertain. (There is, however, a Swan River further southeast in Montana.)

== Course ==
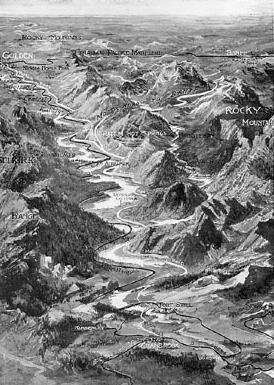
1913 bird's-eye view map of the Kootenay and Columbia Rivers in the Rocky Mountain Trench. Columbia Lake is near the center, and the Kootenay River flows from the upper right into the foreground.

The Kootenay rises on the northeast side of the Beaverfoot Range of southeastern British Columbia and flows initially southeast through a marshy valley in Kootenay National Park. The river becomes significantly larger at its confluence with the Vermilion River, which is actually the larger of the two where they meet near Kootenay Crossing. The Kootenay continues southeast, receiving the Palliser River from the left, and flows south into a gorge at the confluence with the White River.

At the small town of Canal Flats the Kootenay River passes within 2 kilometres (1.2 mi) of Columbia Lake, the headwaters of the Columbia River, as it merges into the Rocky Mountain Trench along the eastern foothills of the Purcell Mountains. It receives the Lussier River near Skookumchuck Station of the Canadian Pacific Railway and the St. Mary and Wild Horse rivers at the historic mining town of Fort Steele, then receives the Bull River at the settlement of the same name. At Wardner, British Columbia, the Kootenay widens into the Lake Koocanusa reservoir. The Elk River, the Kootenay's longest tributary, enters Lake Koocanusa south of Elko, British Columbia.

Stretching 130 kilometres (81 mi) south and crossing the US-Canada Border, Lake Koocanusa is formed by Libby Dam east of Libby, Montana. The Kootenai (as it is now named) receives the Fisher River just downstream of the dam and turns west, forming the "Big Bend" around the southern end of the Purcell Mountains and Libby. About 15 km (9.3 mi) below Libby it drops over Kootenai Falls. The Kootenai turns northwest at Troy, Montana, before the Yaak River joins from the north as the river crosses into Idaho. The Moyie River enters near Moyie Springs before the river enters the gentle terrain of the Kootenai Valley and turns north, flowing past Bonners Ferry and back towards the US-Canada Border.

The river re-enters Canada south of Creston, British Columbia, and flows through a marshy area called the Kootenay Flats before emptying into the 100-kilometre (62 mi) long Kootenay Lake. The lake is also joined by the Duncan River, the river's highest-volume tributary. Near Balfour an arm of the lake branches westward to Nelson, where the Kootenay River exits the lake below Corra Linn Dam. The final westbound stretch of the river flows through a deep canyon, forming several waterfalls including Bonnington Falls, where four run-of-the river hydroelectric dams impound the river. Near Brilliant the Kootenay forms a small inland delta then enters the Columbia River near Castlegar.

== Watershed ==
At 50,298 square kilometres (19,420 mi^{2}), the Kootenay river's watershed is one of the largest sub-basins of the Columbia River system. The watershed stretches almost 400 kilometres (250 mi) from north to south and 250 kilometres (160 mi) from east to west, roughly defining a region of the Pacific Northwest known as the Kootenays. In Canada, the term "Kootenays" is loosely defined although the Kootenay Land District, which includes the whole region, is formally defined; the name indirectly refers to the territory of the Kootenay indigenous people spanning from the Rockies on the east and the, Selkirks and Purcells (Percells in the U.S.) on the west in southeastern British Columbia (BC), and is used to mean more the area drained by the Kootenay River, namely including the lower Canadian stretches of the Columbia from Revelstoke to the US border, and also the reaches of the upper Columbia north from Canal Flats at least as far as Golden (the Boundary Country is sometimes referred to as being part of the West Kootenay).

The Kootenay is the third largest tributary of the Columbia by both watershed size and discharge. Over 70 percent of the Kootenay's watershed is in British Columbia, while 23 percent is in Montana and 6 percent is in Idaho. The Kootenay is one of only a few rivers that cross the US–Canada border multiple times: the others are the Milk River, a tributary of the Missouri River; the Souris River, a tributary of the Assiniboine River; and the Kettle River, a tributary of the Columbia River.

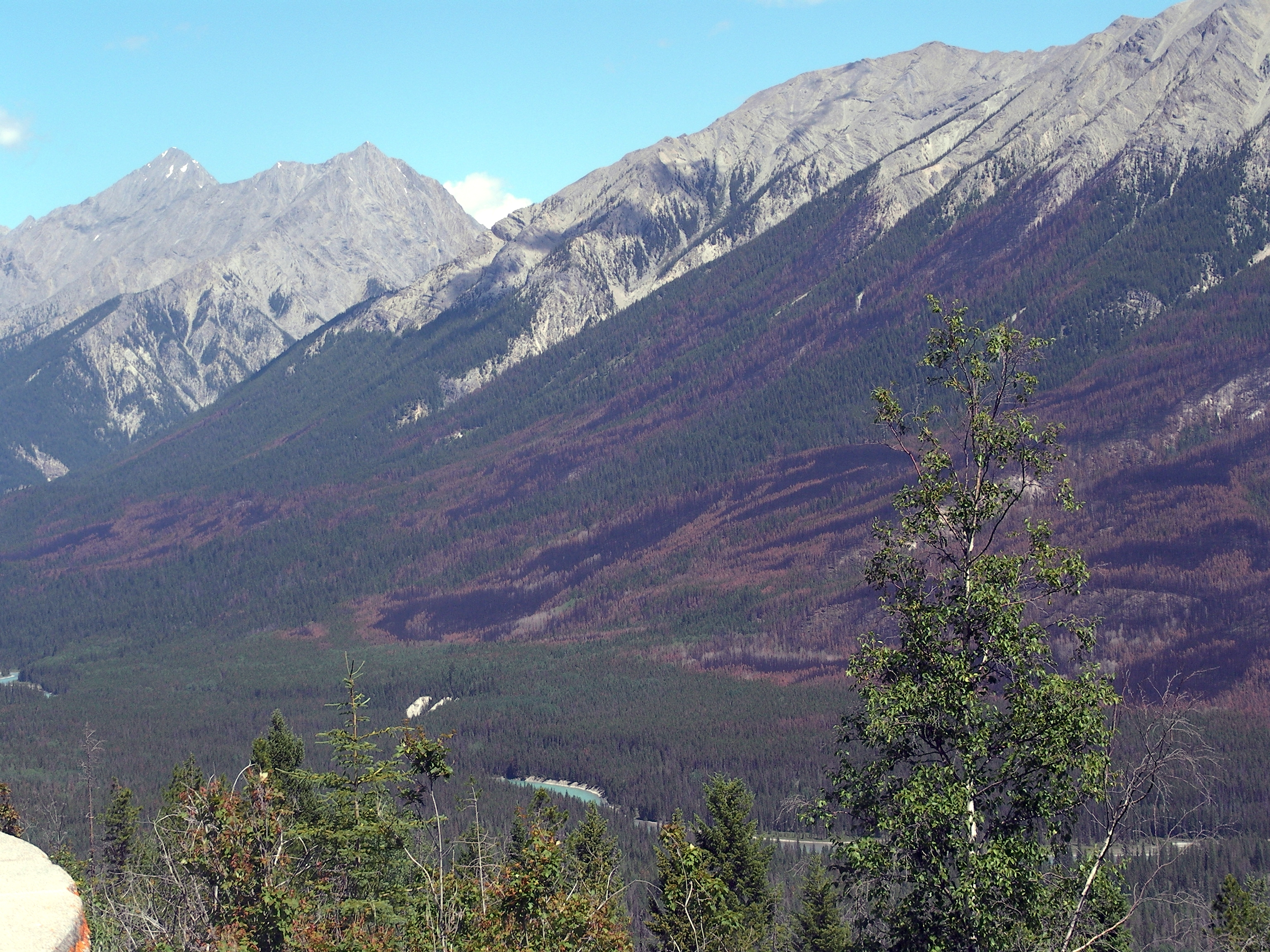
Kootenay River valley in Kootenay National Park

The Kootenay River watershed is defined by rugged parallel mountain ranges of the Rockies, which direct drainage along a northwest–southeast axis. The only large areas of flat land are in the Kootenay River valley from Bonners Ferry, Idaho to Kootenay Lake, and in parts of the Rocky Mountain Trench from Canal Flats to Lake Koocanusa. Of the Kootenay's many tributaries, the 206-kilometre (128 mi)-long Duncan River is the largest. Hundreds of other tributaries join the river in its winding course, including the Vermilion, Cross, Palliser, White, Wild Horse, St. Mary, Elk, Fisher, Yaak, Moyie, Goat, and Slocan rivers.

Many river basins border the Kootenay—some are part of the Columbia Basin, while others drain to distant shores of the North American continent. On the south and southeast, the divide formed by the Cabinet and Whitefish ranges separate the Kootenay and Flathead River watersheds. The Flathead is a tributary of the Clark Fork River-Pend Oreille River system which borders the Kootenay watershed on the southwest. The upper Columbia River basin forms the boundary on the north, and the Kicking Horse River watershed also borders the north side of the Kootenay basin. To the southwest is the Priest River, a Pend Oreille tributary. On the east side, over the Continental Divide, the Bow River and Oldman River take rise. Both are tributaries of the South Saskatchewan River, which is part of the Hudson Bay drainage basin.

=== Geology ===
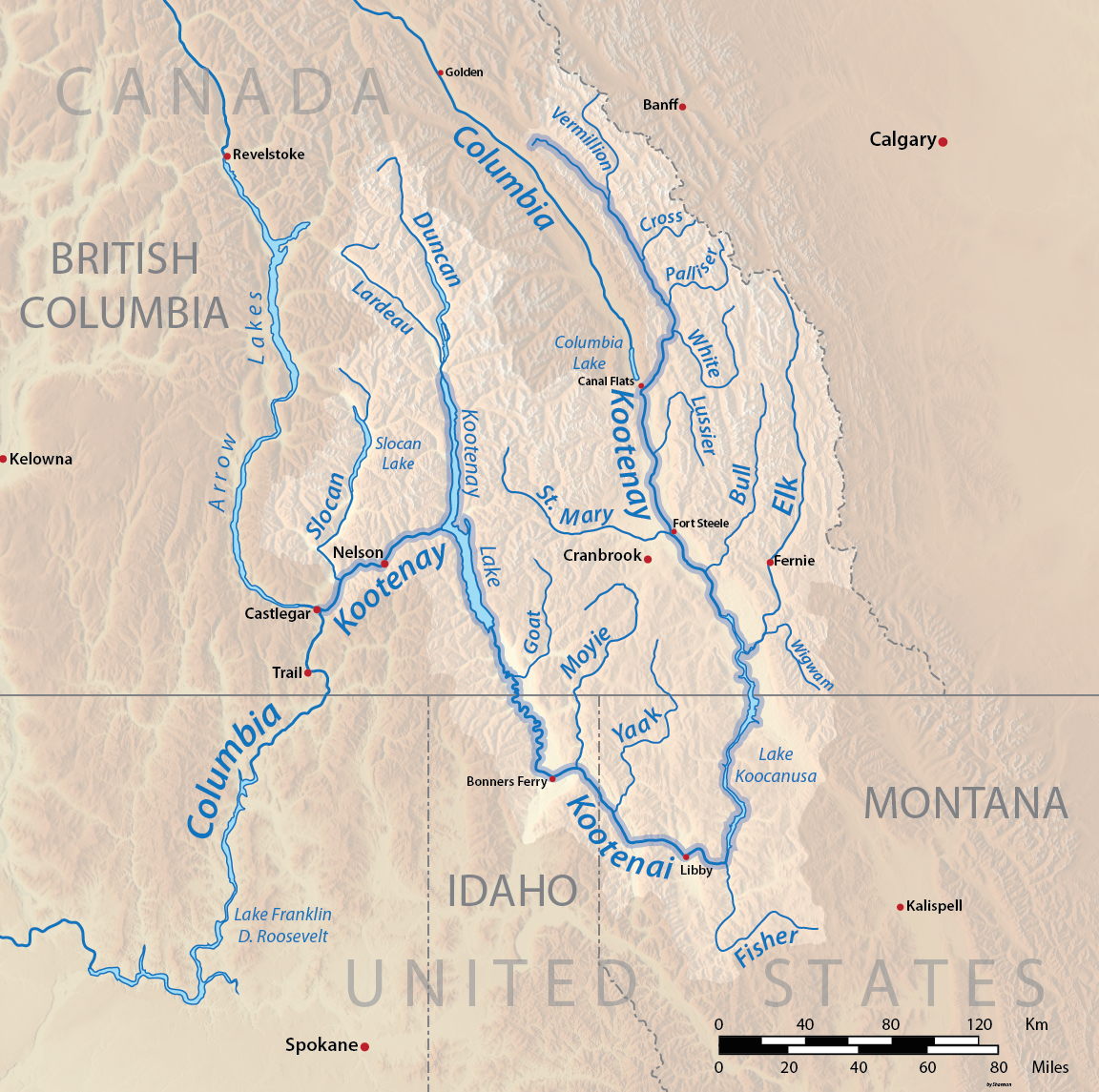
Relief map of the Kootenay River area

The geologic story of the Kootenay is strongly connected to the geology of the Columbia, Selkirk, and Rocky Mountains. The mountains in much of the Kootenay River catchment are composed of Precambrian sedimentary rock of the Belt Supergroup, in turn, stratified into several subgroups with slightly different characteristics and ages. However, most of the rocks have one thing in common; the rocks are generally hard and erosion-resistant. The Rocky Mountain Trench is thought to be a partial graben, or a long narrow strip of land that has dropped in elevation over time because of parallel faults on both sides. Faults in the Kootenay River watershed trend north-northwest to south-southeast as is common in much of British Columbia. The underlying rock is generally stable and contains more outcroppings of metamorphic and igneous rock as one progresses westwards. Formations of Cambrian and Devonian rock also appear in small amounts in the U.S. portion of the Kootenay.

Bedrock composes much of the streambed in the upper and lower reaches of the Kootenay, but in the middle portion, alluvial sediments allow the river to meander over a broader valley floor. The sediments probably originated through heavy glaciation during the previous Ice Age. About 15,000 years ago, the Cordilleran Ice Sheet advanced southwards into present-day BC, Montana, and Idaho, blocking the Kootenay River at the outlet of Kootenay Lake, which did not yet exist. Glaciers covered most of the northern Kootenay River watershed and heavily shaped the peaks and valleys one sees today. The glacier that formed Kootenay Lake caused the river to back up into an enormous body of water that stretched to Libby, Montana, near where the Libby Dam now stands, and possibly even connected to Lake Pend Oreille, which also was much enlarged at the time. Glacially deposited sediments buried the old streambed of the Kootenay River and created a natural dam where the Kootenay turns west out of Kootenay Lake. After the glaciers retreated, Kootenay Lake receded to its present level, and the Kootenay Flats were formed.

== History ==
=== First inhabitants ===
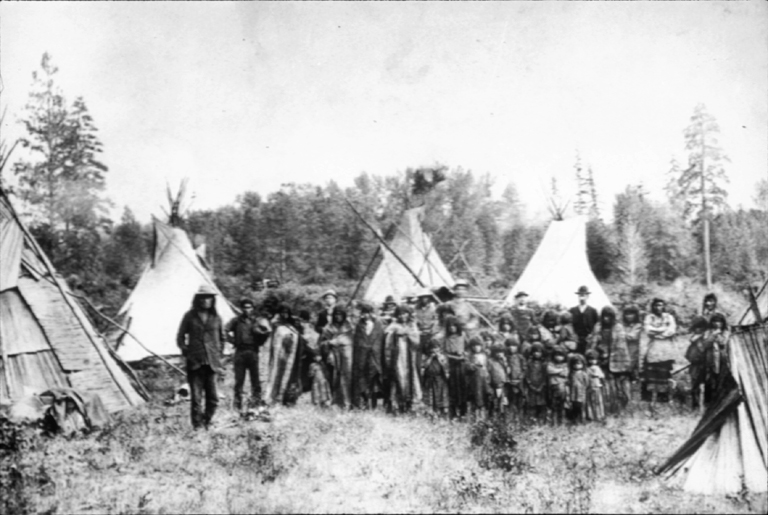
Kootenai group with tepees, circa 1900

The First Peoples of the Kootenay River valley (the residents at the time of European contact) were the Ktunaxa people (often referred to as Kootenai) from whom the river's name derives. Ktunaxa creation myths state that their people were created by the Quilxka Nupika (supreme being) and have always lived in the region; one reads "I have created you Kootenai people to look after this beautiful land, to honor and guard and celebrate my Creation here." However, linguistic and other evidence suggests that they are descended from Great Plains tribes that were driven out of their historic territory by the Blackfeet in the 16th century. The Ktunaxa are considered quite isolated from other Pacific Northwest and Great Plains tribes. Their language is an "isolate", which is only distantly related (if at all) to the Salishan languages spoken by tribes of the Lake Pend d'-Oreille area. They were semi-nomadic people and inhabited a large area of the Kootenay valley from the headwaters to Kootenay Lake. Four villages provided their shelter in the winter, while in the rest of the year, they traveled between fishing, hunting and berry-picking areas. The northern Ktunaxa hunted buffalo, while the southerners mainly fished. Notably, the Ktunaxa were the first tribe west of the Rockies to capture and use feral European-introduced horses for their own use.

The origin and meaning of the name "Kootenai" are uncertain. Before their discovery by Europeans, they were known as Ksanka, "people of the standing arrow". It is thought that French-Canadian fur trappers of the Hudson's Bay Company and other companies in the early 19th century were the first to refer to them as Kootenai, which means "water people" in an Algonquian language. It may also mean "deer robes," referring to their excellent skill for hunting deer. In some written records from the early 19th century, also by the French, the Ktunaxa were sometimes called the Flatbows (Arcs plats) and the river called the Flatbow River. Other inhabitants of the area included the Montana Salish (in the south), and Shuswap (in the north), but these tribes were mostly not on the main river.

=== Exploration ===
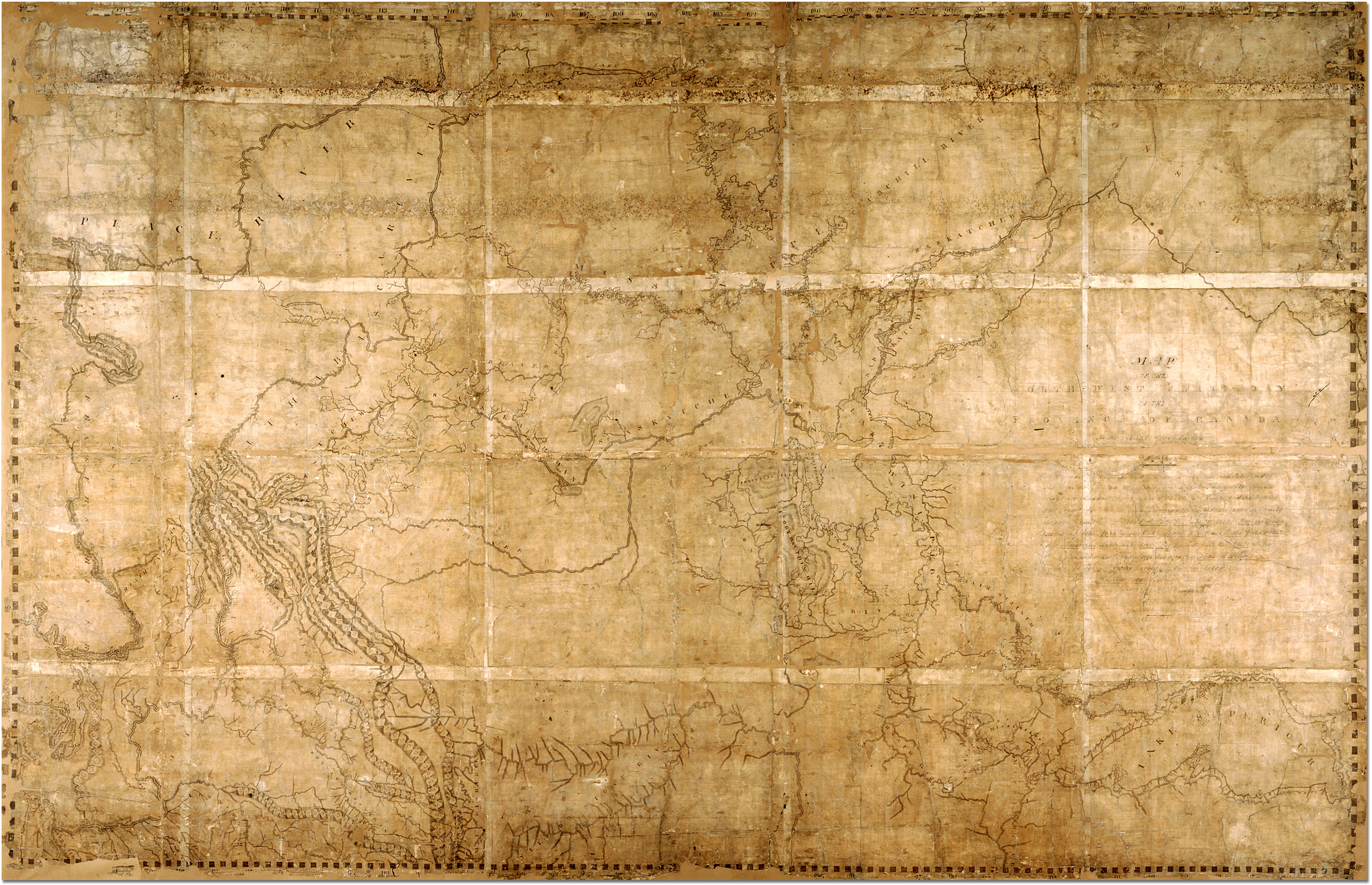
1814 map of the Pacific Northwest and central Canada by David Thompson. The Kootenay River is shown near the bottom left as McGillivray's River.

In 1806, explorer David Thompson set out from Saskatchewan to find the source of the Columbia. He crossed over the Canadian Rockies through Howse Pass and eventually arrived on the banks of the Kootenay, which he thought to be the Columbia. Thompson traveled down the river ways but turned back when he was attacked by Native Americans. The following year, Thompson, his family, and several men made another attempt at finding the Columbia. They crossed over the Rockies at a more northerly spot and traveled down the Blaeberry River to the Columbia, eventually discovering Columbia Lake and establishing there the trading post Kootenae House. In the spring of 1808, he set off down the Kootenay River, this time reaching present-day Montana and Idaho, where he established Kullyspell House and Saleesh House, trading posts on Lake Pend Oreille and the Clark Fork, respectively. After spending a winter in Montana, he tried to reach the Columbia by traveling down the Pend Oreille River but failed in this attempt, eventually returning to Kootenae House via the Kootenay River northwards the following spring.

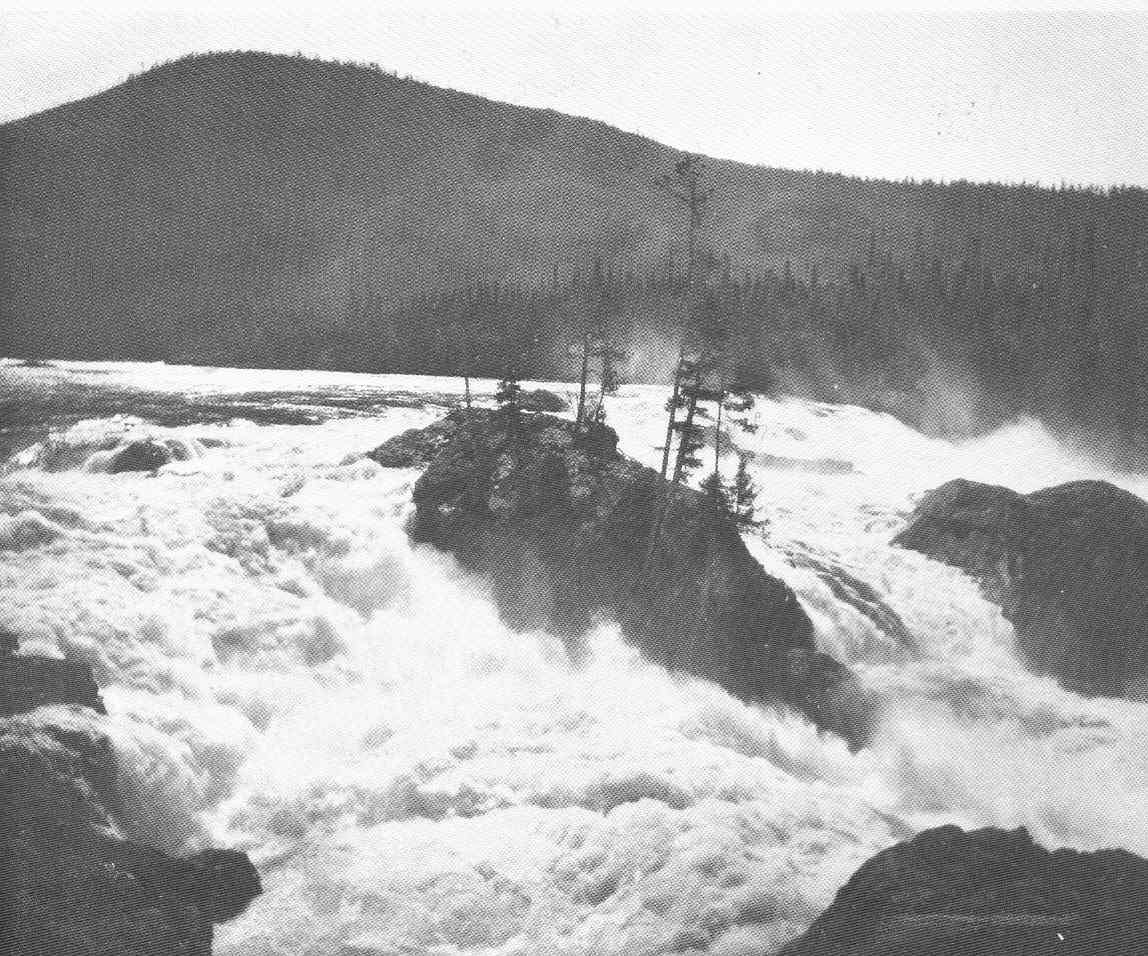
Falls of the Kootenay River below Kootenay Lake, ca. 1936

Through the early 19th century, Thompson continued to trade furs throughout the Kootenay region for the North West Company, and for the few years when he had a total monopoly over the Canadian fur trade west of the Rockies, he outlawed alcoholic drinks altogether. He was known to have written, "I had made it a law to myself that no alcohol should pass the mountains in my company". When two of Thompson's trading partners tried to make him take two barrels of rum to Kootanae House, Thompson "placed the two kegs on a vicious horse and by noon the kegs were empty and in pieces, the horse rubbing his load against the rocks to get rid of it ... I told them what I had done, and that I would do the same to every keg of alcohol." Of course, wine, beer, rum, and other intoxicating drinks were imported in time.

In 1846, the Oregon Boundary Dispute was settled with the stroke of a pen and a straight line which ignored the topography.

John Palliser crossed the Rockies through a pass in 1858 that led to the headwaters of the Palliser River, a tributary of the Kootenay River now named in his honor. (However, at first, his party referred to it as Palliser's River.) His expedition made it downstream to Columbia Lake but had some trouble making their way back to Alberta; the return route they had chosen proved too dangerous to negotiate. After trading for some horses and new supplies from a band of Ktunaxa, they made it back over the Rockies later that year through North Kootenay Pass near Lower and Upper Kananaskis Lakes, after traveling up the Elk River. The series of expeditions he would later lead through 1859 were to be known as the Palliser Expeditions, or officially, the British North American Exploring Expedition, which, although involved some travel west of the Rockies, was mostly limited to the east side of the Continental Divide. Palliser's earlier travels were credited for being a "vital forerunner to the European settlement of the Prairies [of central Canada], providing volumes of information on the resources of this vast region."

In September 1859, Palliser traveled into the Kootenay River valley to find a suitable path for a trade route and possibly a railroad. Instead of crossing the Rockies, as Thompson did, Palliser set out from Fort Colville, a Hudson's Bay Company trading post near Kettle Falls on the Columbia River. He then proceeded up the Pend Oreille River (noted as 'Pendoreilles') and crossed into the Kootenay River valley, which in his records was either the "Kootanie" or "Flat Bow River". Kootenay Lake was called "Flat Bow Lake". Palliser was told by Ktunaxa tribal members that a trail already existed along the Kootenay River, terminating at Columbia Lake, but was in decrepit condition (having been out of use for many years) and "entirely impracticable for horses". They re-blazed the trail for many miles and returned to Kootenay Lake by mid-October of the same year. The expedition's findings were later to become important transportation routes through the Rockies to the Kootenays area, and the trail that they followed later became the route of the Canadian Pacific Railway.

=== Gold and silver boom ===
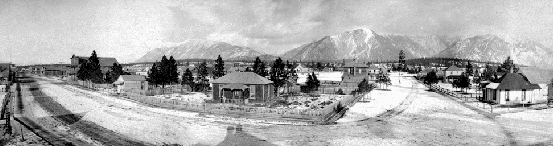
The mining settlement of Fort Steele in 1910

In 1863, a gold strike at the confluence of the Wild Horse and Kootenay Rivers in the East Kootenay region resulted in the Wild Horse Gold Rush in which between three and ten thousand men descended upon the area and the gold rush town of Fisherville was built; it had to be moved when it was discovered the town sat atop some of the richest deposits. Originally, the river (and the area) were known as "Stud Horse" by the early miners, but government officials changed it to Wild Horse. The new town's site was officially named Kootenai (though still known as Fisherville), also spelled Kootenay and Koutenais and also known as Wild Horse. Galbraith's Ferry was established across the Kootenay near Fort Steele to facilitate crossing by the incoming rush of prospectors and merchants. Most of the gold was mined out by 1864, in June of which one American prospector wrote that some 200 miners were arriving each day. By 1865 the peak of the rush was over, and the diggings had been found not as rich as previously believed when news arrived in 1865 of the strikes in the Big Bend of the Columbia and the bulk of the mining population moved there en masse.

Fisherville, which had a Hudson's Bay post and other businesses, continued on with a few hundred residents for a few years (most of them Chinese by the end, as was the case with many other BC gold towns also) but was eclipsed as a supply centre with the creation of nearby Fort Steele. The Chinese miners continued to work the "played-out" claims abandoned by American and Canadian miners, taking what little gold was left. Fisherville eventually was abandoned, its buildings left to ruin, and little remains of the settlement today. Other gold rushes on the Moyie and Goat Rivers, tributaries of the Kootenay, were followed by the discovery of silver and galena mines in the Kootenay Lake and Slocan Valley areas (Silvery Slocan), leading rapidly to the settlement of the region and the creation of various "silver city" boomtowns, notably Nelson, at the outlet of Kootenay Lake, Kaslo, midway up its north arm, New Denver, Silverton, Slocan City and Sandon in the 1880s and 1890s. By 1889, a smelter had been constructed close to the mouth of the Kootenay, near Revelstoke, to process ore from the mines. Serving the mines and settlers, steamer companies plied the Kootenai River from Bonners Ferry, Idaho to Nelson and to the Lardeau or "Lardo" district at the north end of Kootenay Lake, and also on the upper Kootenay River between the Cranbrook-Fort Steele area and points in Montana.

=== Steamboats ===
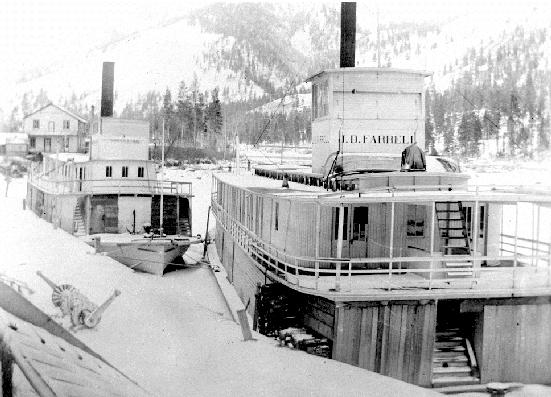
Sternwheelers J.D. Farrell and North Star on the Kootenay at Jennings, Montana

When the Canadian Pacific Railway (CPR) finished its transcontinental line across southern British Columbia, steamboats began to ply the upper Columbia and Kootenay Rivers, carrying passengers, produce, ore, and other trade items through the region to be distributed via the CPR's line at Golden. The total run was about 500 kilometres (310 mi) long, ranging from Golden to the north to Jennings, Montana in the south, with a portage at Canal Flats. Kootenay's steamboat era was short and lasted for only about 28 years. In 1882, as part of an incentive to help navigation on the Golden-Jennings run and possibly divert water northwards to the Interior of British Columbia in order to provide flood control for a low-lying area south of Kootenay Lake, called Kootenay Flats, European adventurer William Adolf Baillie-Grohman proposed the creation of a canal between the Kootenay River and Columbia Lake. Construction of the 2-kilometre (1.2 mi)-long, 14-metre (46 ft)-broad channel was finished in 1889. The Baillie-Grohman Canal, as it was called, had one lock which was 30 metres (98 ft) long and 9 metres (30 ft) wide.

Because of the rugged terrain and rough waters on the two rivers, especially on the glacier-fed Kootenay, steamboat operation was extremely difficult and proved to be anything but cost-effective. The roughest water was in Jennings Canyon, now mostly submerged in the Lake Koocanusa reservoir behind Libby Dam. Two of the first steamers, the Duchess and the Cline, sank when transporting miners to the Wild Horse gold rush on the Kootenay. Both ships had not even reached Canal Flats when they hit rocks in the Columbia. The first steamboat to run the Kootenay was the Annerly in 1893. Later vessels, such as the Gwendoline, had mixed success. Captain Frank P. Armstrong, who had piloted several earlier steamboats on the Golden-Jennings run, was her builder and when she was about three-quarters completed, Armstrong decided to take her to Golden to complete the job. Gwendoline sailed up to the canal, which unfortunately was unusable because the gates of the lock had been dynamited due to a Kootenay flood. Armstrong was forced to portage the vessel and eventually made it to Golden. Gwendoline eventually sailed back south to Jennings to haul iron ore on the Kootenay. She was also the only ship to ever travel through the canal by proper means and made two of the only three steamboat trips through the canal.

The last ship ever to pass through the canal and one of the last on the Kootenay was the North Star, also piloted by Captain Armstrong. In 1902, Armstrong decided to take North Star to sail on the Columbia instead, finding business on the Kootenay less and less profitable as the mines in the region played out, as the CPR established its Kootenay Central Railway branch, and for a variety of other reasons. In June of that year, Armstrong took North Star to the Baillie-Grohman Canal, which was in decrepit condition. The lock was also too small to accommodate the vessel. Armstrong had two makeshift dams built to create a temporary lock 40 metres (130 ft) long, and then the forward dam was blown up so the ship could ride the surge of water ahead into Columbia Lake. The transit of North Star to Columbia Lake was the last time the canal was ever used by a steamboat and marked the end of the steamboat era on the Kootenay.

=== Doukhobor settlement ===
In the 20th century, members of a Russian religious sect called the Doukhobors living in the plains of Saskatchewan in central Canada were facing persecution, internal problems, and land confiscation by the Canadian government. Their leader, Peter Verigin, decided to move them to British Columbia in 1909, seeking land and improved life. He chose a townsite on the north bank of the Kootenay, where it joins the Columbia, across the big river from where the present-day town of Castlegar now stands. In 1909, he purchased about 14,000 acres (57 km^{2}) adjoining the mouth of the Kootenay River partly using funds raised by sale of farm equipment in Saskatchewan, and added to other lands acquired throughout BC, Doukhobor-owned lands ultimately totaled 19,000 acres (77 km^{2}). There was already a small settlement on the site, called Waterloo, but Verigin renamed it Brilliant, for the "sparkling waters" of the river. The whole area was known by the name, Dolina Ooteschenie, meaning "valley of consolation". By 1913, there were already more than 5,000 Doukhobors living in the region.

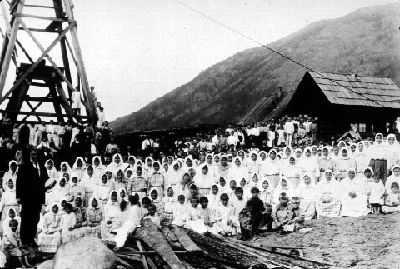
Peter Verigin (left) and group of followers in Glade, British Columbia, circa 1907

When they first arrived in British Columbia, the Doukhobors began felling trees in the Kootenay River valley to build their first homesteads. They also cleared areas of level ground in order to plant orchards and fields and constructed sawmills on the Columbia and Kootenay rivers to process the logs into lumber. After more settlers began arriving, they built larger buildings that housed multiple families instead of the small cabins then typical of the region. Each larger house or dom, holding 70-100 persons each, was constructed on roughly 41-hectare (100-acre) plots of land that Verigin had divided the entire community into back in 1911. The Doukhobors then constructed a brick factory at the present-day site of Grand Forks, from where they made bricks to be used mostly in the Brilliant settlement. Brilliant was one of the first cities in the area to have running water; a reservoir was constructed to hold water from the Kootenay River and a local spring, and by 1912, each household had running water. In 1913, Verigin converted an abandoned factory in Nelson, about 35 kilometres (22 mi) up the Kootenay from Brilliant, to produce jam and marmalade. The Doukhobors then established a ferry across the Columbia River, and a suspension bridge serving the same purpose was completed in 1913. For many years, Brilliant continued to be a major center in the region's lumber industry.

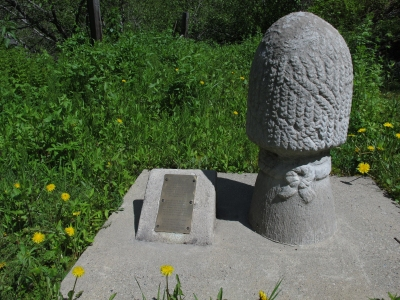
Verigin Memorial

However, Doukhobor views on education and the extremist actions of a Doukhobor group called the Sons of Freedom eventually spelled the end of their settlement. In the 1920s, unknown arsonists destroyed several public schools in Brilliant as an act against British Columbia law. Then in 1924, on a routine rail trip to Grand Forks, Peter Verigin and seven other people were killed by a dynamite explosion that completely destroyed the coach that he was traveling in. Pieces of battery and alarm clock indicated that this was the work of people who intentionally wanted to kill Verigin, most likely members of the Sons of Freedom, or as some historians put it, by the lover of one of Verigin's handmaidens. Over 7,000 people attended Verigin's funeral. The Doukhobor leader was buried in an elaborate tomb on a headland overlooking the city of Brilliant and the Kootenay and Columbia Rivers. Verigin was succeeded by his son, Peter P. Verigin, who arrived from Russia in 1927. Despite the economic reforms he created in response to debt to the federal government, his arrival coincided with a terrible depression and bankruptcy which caused the Doukhobors to lose most of their lands. Verigin Jr. died in 1939 and by 1963, almost all Doukhobor lands were sold to the government. Today, little remains of the former settlement at Brilliant except for Verigin's tomb. The Doukhobor suspension bridge spanning the Kootenay River still stands, and was designated a National Historic Site of Canada in 1995.

== Ecology ==
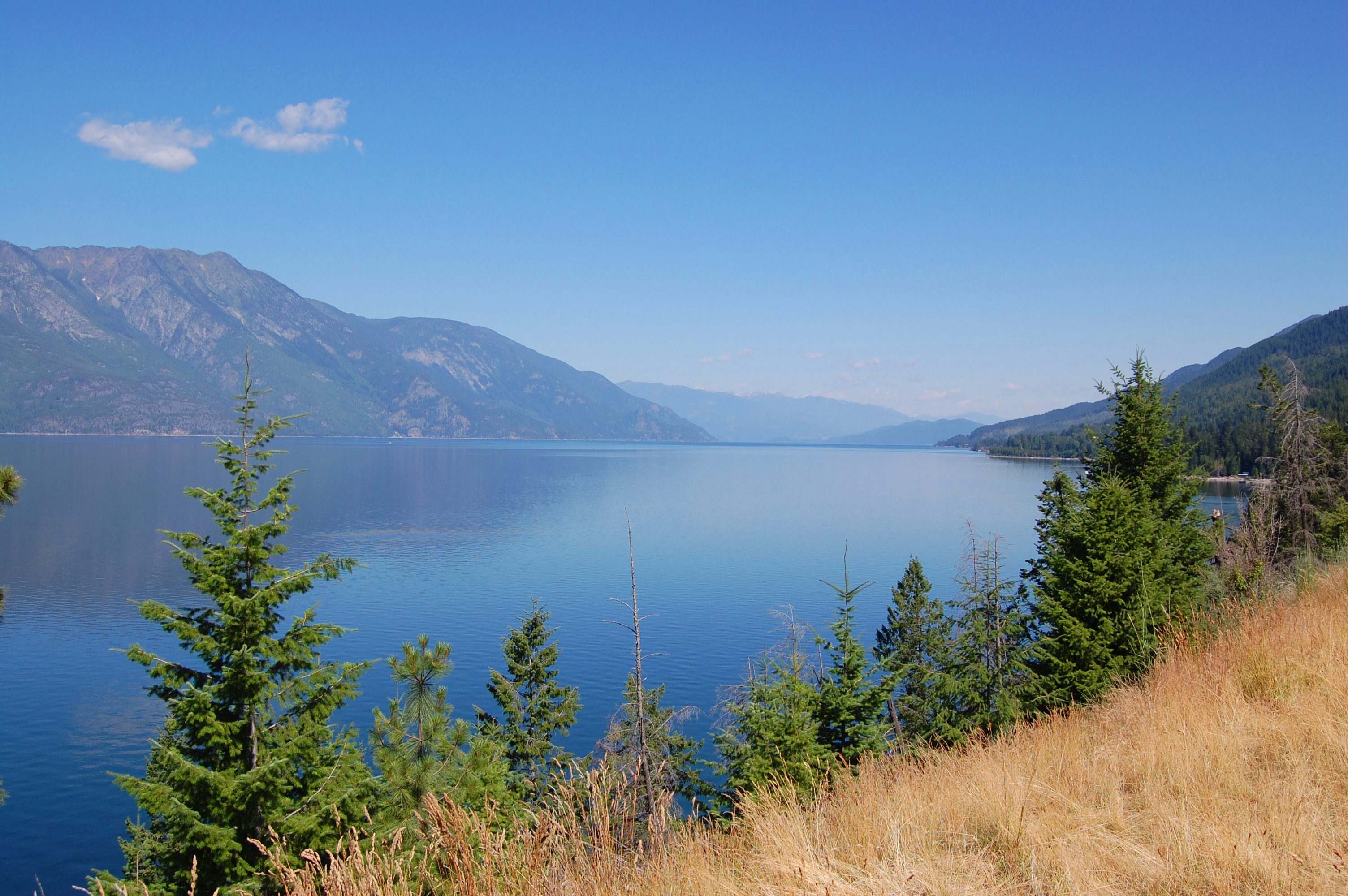
The south (Kootenay) arm of Kootenay Lake

The Northwest Power and Conservation Council divides the Kootenay River watershed into six biomes: aquatic (rivers and lakes), riparian zones, wetlands, grassland/shrubs, moderately wet forest, and dry forest. The forested zones extend through the alpine and subalpine reaches of the watershed, while grasslands dominate the low terraces and plateaus surrounding the river, especially in the Lake Koocanusa area and the Montana-Idaho portion of the watershed. In the Canada portion of the watershed, an alpine meadow ecozone occupies most of the high ridges and valleys of the mountains.

In the Canadian portion of the Columbia Basin, almost half of which is part of the Kootenay River basin, there are 447 species of terrestrial vertebrates. Most of the Kootenay basin lies within the Columbia Glaciated ecoregion which encompasses much of northeastern Washington, northern Idaho, northwestern Montana and southern British Columbia. Fish fauna in the region are largely shared with those of the Columbia Unglaciated ecoregion to the south, which has about fifty species of fish and only one endemic species. There are no endemic fish within the Columbia Glaciated region itself.

Riparian vegetation is mostly found along the lower two-thirds of the Kootenay and many of the tributaries that join within the United States. The other sections of the river flow through far more rugged terrain and are characterized by braiding, low nutrient content, shifting channels and coarse sediments, making it difficult for riparian zones to be established, as is with most of its upper and lower tributaries. Wetlands are found primarily where the river broadens into a series of sloughs, side-channels, marshes and small lakes before entering Kootenay Lake. This biologically diverse area, the Kootenay Flats, once supported over 1 million migratory birds every year, before the river was diked and many of the wetlands converted to agriculture.

Naturally, the Kootenay has a high sediment content because of high erosion of glacial sediments in the mountains. Because of the steep rapids and falls between Kootenay Lake and the river's mouth, the Kootenay (with the exception of its tributary, the Slocan River) has never been a significant stream for the annual runs of Columbia River salmon. However, landlocked salmon inhabit the upper reaches of the river above and in Kootenay Lake. This is attributed to a Kootenay River flood a long time ago, before the construction of any dams on the Columbia (Columbia River dams now block salmon from reaching any of the salmon run streams above Chief Joseph Dam ) which overflowed into Columbia Lake. It was with the creation of this temporary body of water that salmon somehow managed to swim over the submerged Canal Flats and into the Kootenay, where they became trapped.

Populations of large land mammals such as caribou, moose, deer, elk, have been declining dramatically since the reintroduction of wolves. Species almost entirely gone that were once common in the area include the white-tailed jackrabbit, pygmy short-horned lizard, band-tailed pigeon and passenger pigeon. After exploitation of the Kootenay basin by fur trappers, the beaver population was nearly exterminated as well.

== Economy ==
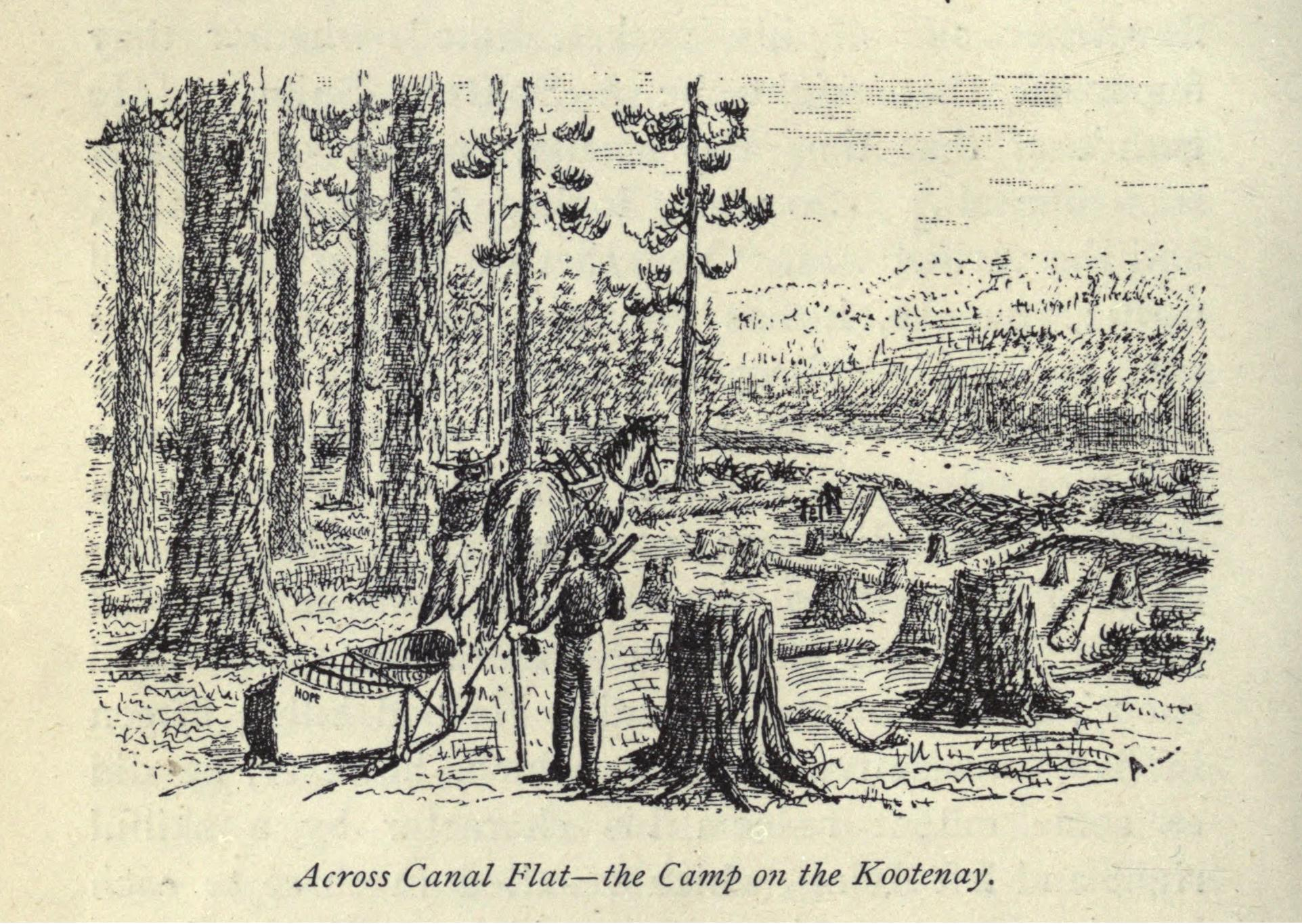
1887 illustration of logging at Canal Flats, British Columbia

Even before non-aboriginal people came to the region, the Kootenay River valley was an important path of trade and transport between the tribes of the Canadian Rockies and the Idaho Panhandle, mostly between the Ktunaxa (who practiced agriculture and aquaculture) and the Salish, Blackfeet and Pend d'Oreilles of the south and east, and with the Shuswap in the north. The physiographic continuation of the Kootenai Valley southwards from present-day Bonners Ferry, Idaho into the Pend Oreille basin via the Purcell Trench formed a natural corridor through which natives of the area could interact. The barrier formed by the Rocky Mountains to the east, however, meant that tribes of the area, especially the Ktunaxa, were economically and linguistically isolated from the Great Plains tribes (with the exception of the Shoshone, whose territory spanned both sides of the Rockies).

Logging began in the 19th century as a result of white emigration to the Kootenay region, and remains one of the primary industries of the area. In fact, much of the economy of the Pacific Northwest and Columbia Basin has historically been, and continues to be, to this day, dependent on the lumber industry. Lumber was required for the construction of buildings, forts, railroad tracks, and boats, and today is exported from the region in great amounts providing jobs and income for inhabitants of the area. Even in relatively uninhabited regions of the watershed, logging roads criss-cross the hills and mountainsides. Over 90 percent of the Kootenay basin is forested, but only about 10 percent of the area is not affected by some kind of lumber-industry development, now defined as about twenty "roadless areas" or "blocks", with 18 in the US.

To a limited extent, the Kootenay River has also been used for navigation. Commercial navigation began with steamboats in the 19th century to transport ores, lumber, passengers and other imported and exported products between the Kootenay River valley and the Canadian Pacific Railway station at Golden, British Columbia. Boat travel on the upper river ceased when a rail line was built along the Kootenay upstream of the big bend. Steamboats also operated briefly on the lower river and Kootenay Lake to service silver mines in the nearby mountains. In modern times, boats continue to ply Kootenay Lake and limited reaches of the Kootenay River.

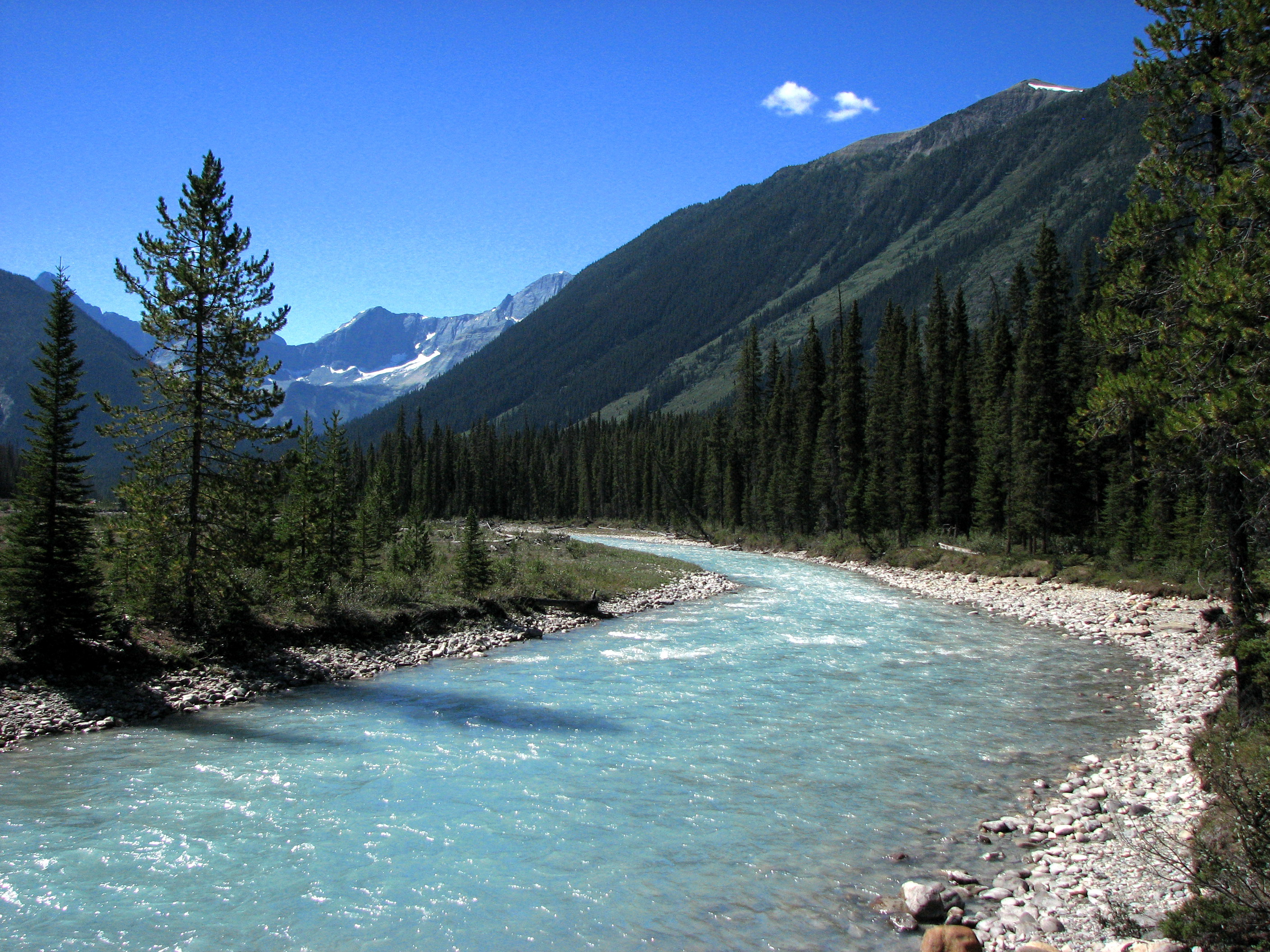
The Vermilion River is a tributary of the Kootenay River in Kootenay National Park

Mining is also an important economic sector of the Kootenay River area. Although originally valuable minerals such as gold and silver were unearthed, today coal is the primary resource extracted from underground. Conventional coal deposits underlie much of the East Kootenay, especially in the Elk River valley which is home to the Elk Valley Coalfield, and the Crowsnest Coalfield in the Purcell Mountains. The East Kootenay is the most important coal-producing area of British Columbia, has since 1898 produced over 500 million tons, and about 25 percent of the world's steel-making coal comes from the region. Most of the coal from the East Kootenay coalfields is exported to Japan and Korea.

Lead, zinc, copper and silver are still mined at some places in the Kootenay River basin, notably at the giant Sullivan Mine near Kimberley, British Columbia, which is the largest in the Kootenay watershed. Agriculture, however, is a much less important industry, and many of the fertile riverside lands have been flooded by the construction of dams (most notably Libby Dam in Montana, which backs water into Canada). Only about two percent of the entire Kootenay basin (1,005 square kilometres (388 mi^{2}) is used for agriculture, and much of that is for pasture and foraging). Crops such as oats, barley and wheat account for 62 percent of the agricultural output of the region, much of which is used locally or exported by rail. The primary agricultural region is the Kootenai Valley of northern Idaho south of Kootenay Lake.

The West Kootenay, however, is transitioning from a coal-mining to a tourism-based economy, and the rest of the Kootenay region is also starting to do so. The economy of southeastern British Columbia is becoming increasingly reliant on tourism, and several Canadian national and state parks have already been established, and several national forests in the U.S. A pier exists in Nelson, BC.

== River modifications ==
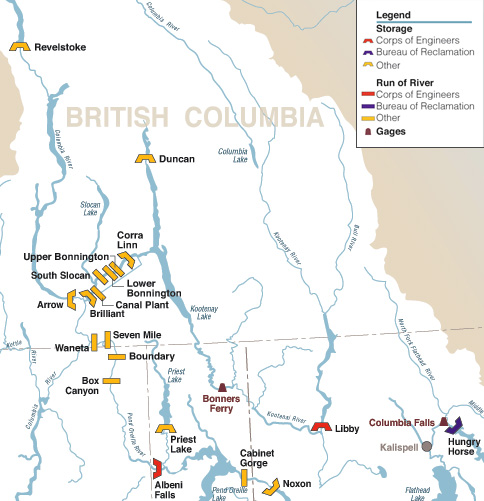
Map highlighting major dams and reservoirs in the Kootenay River watershed and surrounds

Dams, power plants and diversions of the Kootenay River, of which there are many, have been built for a variety of reasons throughout the 19th and 20th centuries. The seven dams on the Kootenay serve many purposes, ranging from generation of local electricity to regulation of Columbia River flow between Canada and the United States. None provide for navigation or fish passage. In former times, the Kootenay would rise each spring and early summers with "enormous freshets that every summer flood the Kootenay River valley". Such extreme variations are no longer common on the river below Libby Dam.

=== The Falls ===
As early as 1898, without building a dam, the original Lower Bonnington Power Plant was generating hydroelectricity from Bonnington Falls in the Kootenay River near the confluence of the Slocan River in order to supply water to mines in Rossland, British Columbia. For Upper Bonnington, the first dam built on the river, the original goal was to improve navigation between Kootenay Lake and the Kootenay's mouth on the Columbia by drowning the dangerous Bonnington Falls rapids that also blocked fish migration, and hopefully introducing fish to the upper river by constructing a fish ladder. None of these amenities for steamboats or salmon were ever constructed—in fact, the dam ended up being built above the falls instead of below them— and Upper Bonnington Dam, when completed in 1906, only generated hydroelectric power, and has served that purpose ever since.

Commercial demand led to two more dams at the falls, these were South Slocan Dam in 1928, and Corra Linn Dam, at the rapids above Bonnington in 1932. Three of the dams are of the run-of-the-river type, the 4.5 km length of the falls is now impounded in small lakes. All except Corra Linn, which was built to raise and regulate the level of Kootenay Lake. The Kootenay Canal Generating Station, completed in 1976 by BC Hydro, has its inlet at Kootenay Lake next to Corra Linn. The canal travels several kilometers, parallel to and above the river to utilize the roughly 84-metre (276 ft) high water drop in elevation between Kootenay Lake and South Slocan, bypassing the old dams. The canal is used to generate hydroelectricity, as are the four dams.

=== The Lower River ===
After the falls and the junction with the Slocan River the last 18 kilometres (11 mi) of the river is a gradual slope to the merger with the Columbia. In 1944 the last privately owned development Brilliant Dam was built, just 2.5 kilometres (1.6 mi) before the Kootenay river flows into the Columbia River at Castlegar.

=== Columbia River Treaty ===
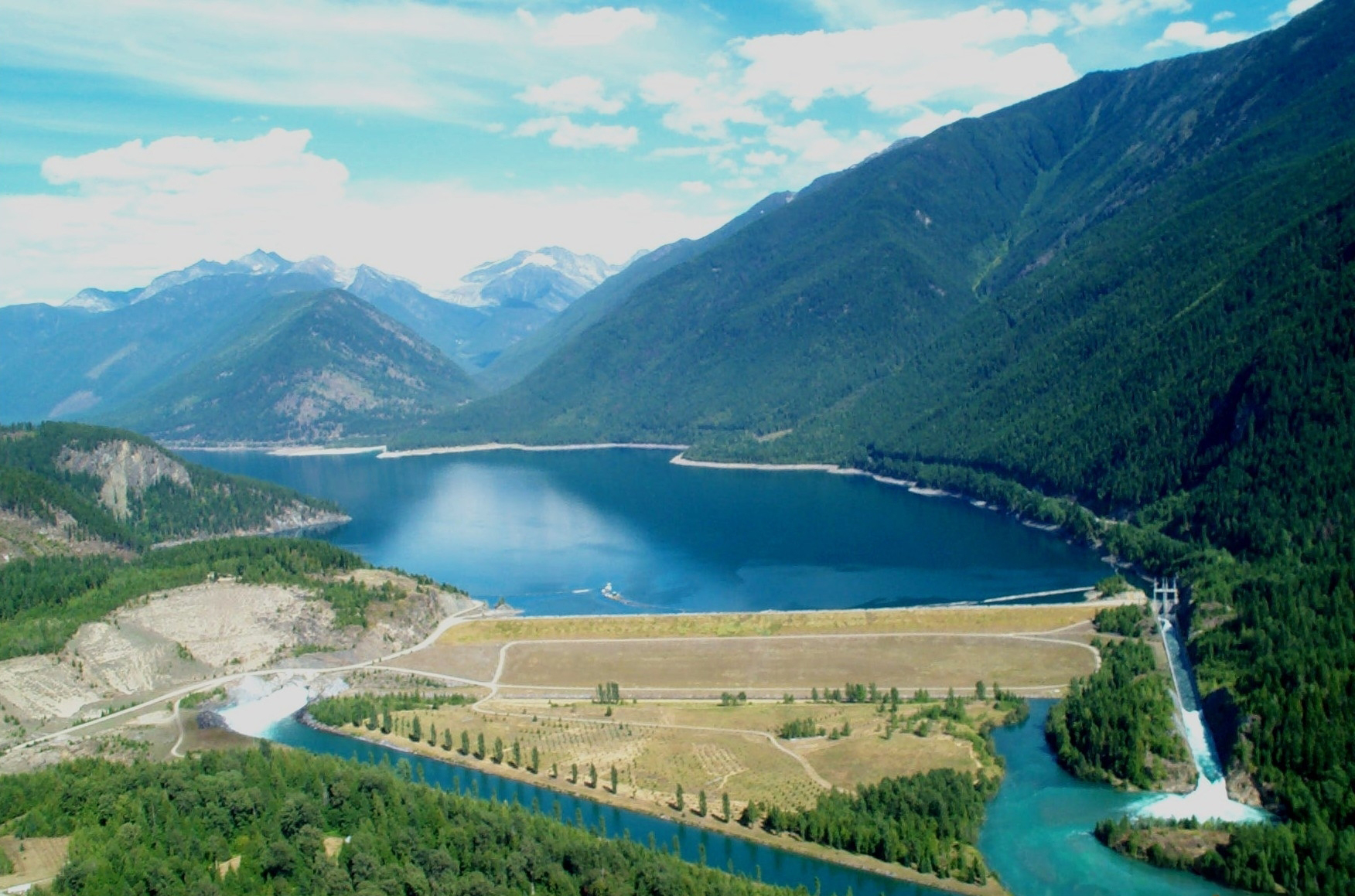
Duncan Dam on the Duncan River regulates water flow into Kootenay Lake as part of the Columbia River Treaty

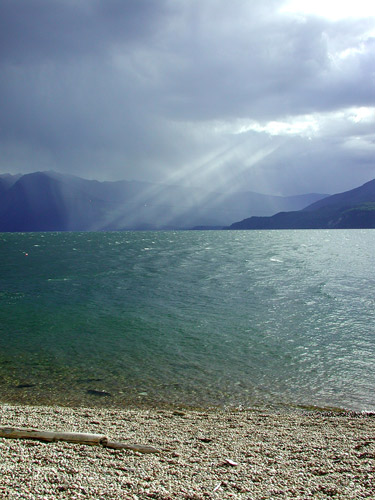
Kootenay Lake

The Columbia Basin is noted for its spring floods, major flood years were 1876, 1894, 1948 and 1964. As recently as the mid-1960s, the upper Columbia and Kootenay rivers in British Columbia were still free-flowing and unaffected by dams and reservoirs, resulting in the 1948 Vanport Oregon flood. The uncontrolled discharge past the Canada-U.S. border created problems for electricity generation in the US, and Canada also wanted to utilize the Columbia river for the production of hydroelectric power. Negotiated in 1961 between the governments of the two countries, the Columbia River Treaty attempted to ratify these problems. Construction of the first three of the four dams authorized by the treaty—Mica, Keenleyside and Duncan—was implemented in 1964. Of the four dams, the first two are on the Columbia, the third is on the Duncan River, a tributary of the Kootenay, and the fourth Libby, on the Kootenai in Montana. However, operation of the dams has led to environmental problems in both rivers because they have caused unnatural flow fluctuations, blocked fish migration, flooded fertile agricultural land, and forced over 2,000 people to relocate.

Solely built for the purpose of regulating water flow into Kootenay Lake, Duncan Dam, the first dam built for the treaty, was raised in 1967 and increased the 25-kilometre (16 mi) long size of Duncan Lake to a reservoir 45 kilometres (28 mi) long. Because of its purpose, it has no power generation facilities. Libby Dam, the fourth and last dam built under the treaty, was completed in 1975 by the U.S. Army Corps of Engineers. The other two dams built for the treaty, Keenleyside and Mica, are both on the Columbia River. Kootenay basin reservoirs provide nearly 8.6 cubic kilometres (7,000,000 acre⋅ft) of storage which constitutes almost half of the 19.1 cubic kilometres (15,500,000 acre⋅ft) stored in Columbia River Treaty reservoirs.

=== Diversion proposal ===
In the 1970s, it was proposed that the Kootenay River be diverted into the Columbia River (the two rivers are separated by a distance of no more than 2 kilometers (1.2 mi) near Canal Flats in the Rocky Mountain Trench in southeastern British Columbia). This would allow for the generation of increased hydroelectric power on the Columbia. It would also make easier the reclamation of the Kootenay Flats, an area south of Kootenay Lake, for agricultural purposes—spring freshets once raised the level of the lake by up to 8 metres (26 ft), inundating the lowlands around it. There were also never-implemented plans to divert part of the Kootenay enlarged Columbia River through a tunnel to the headwaters of the Thompson River in the northwest, and thence to the Fraser River valley of southwestern British Columbia.

The proposal was strongly opposed by both environmentalists as well as local residents. The economy of southeastern British Columbia is strongly dependent on tourism, with the Columbia River, including Columbia Lake and Windermere Lake, being very popular for summer swimming and boating activities. Diversion of the glacier-fed Kootenay River would have resulted in the Columbia River becoming much deeper and colder, flooding riverside communities and damaging tourism. At the opposite end of the scale, it would dry the bed of the Kootenay River downstream of Canal Flats, cutting off water supply to residents of the upper Kootenay Valley and invalidating the effectiveness of Libby Dam, whose construction was to begin in a few years. As a result, this proposed river diversion was never undertaken.

== Recreation ==
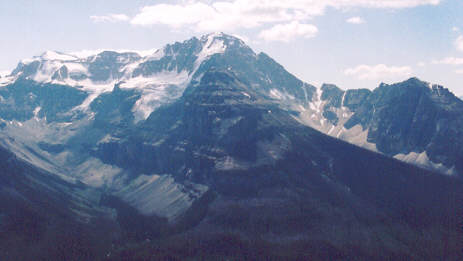
Stanley Peak in Kootenay National Park

=== Parks ===
Many national, provincial and state parks, wilderness preserves, protected areas and national forests lie partially or wholly within the Kootenay River watershed. In Canada, these include those listed below as well as many others.

- Bugaboo Provincial Park
- Creston Valley Wildlife Management Area
- Gilnockie Provincial Park
- Goat Range Provincial Park
- Kianuko Provincial Park
- Kokanee Glacier Provincial Park
- Kootenai Falls County Park
- Kootenay National Park
- Mount Assiniboine Provincial Park
- Purcell Wilderness Conservancy Provincial Park and Protected Area
- St. Mary's Alpine Provincial Park
- Top of the World Provincial Park
- Valhalla Provincial Park
- West Arm Provincial Park

Popular Banff National Park lies just across the BC–Alberta border, Yoho National Park sits to the north, and Glacier National Park in the northeast. The U.S. portion of the watershed includes Kootenai National Forest and Kaniksu National Forest (part of the Idaho Panhandle National Forests, which stretch southwards into the state).

In Kootenay National Park alone, there are over 200 kilometres (120 mi) of hiking trails, ranging from short day hikes to long backpacking trips. Cross-country skiing and snowshoeing are popular on the park's trails in the winter. Mount Assiniboine Provincial Park, which sits right next to Kootenay in the Rocky Mountains, also has an extensive trail system affording extensive views of the surrounding ranges. Kikomun Creek Provincial Park, on the northeast shore of Lake Koocanusa, includes campgrounds and access to boat launches on the east shore of the lake. The Kootenai River Trail along the Montana section of the river, about 10 kilometres (6.2 mi) long, follows the river from Libby to Kootenai Falls and the well known Swinging Bridge across the Kootenai. Skattebo Reach Trail, on the lower river, is about 14 kilometres (8.7 mi) long, running from Brilliant to Glade. Further downstream, five separate sites around Kootenay Lake form the Kootenay Lake Provincial Park. West Arm Provincial Park is on the impounded stretch of the Kootenay River just west of Kootenay Lake, and to the northeast of Nelson. Smaller Kokanee Creek Provincial Park, one of the more popular recreation areas in the West Kootenay, sits across the river from West Arm.

=== Fishing ===
Fishing is generally good on the middle reaches of the Kootenay River and in Kootenay Lake. Westslope cutthroat trout, bull trout, kokanee salmon (the landlocked Pacific salmon), rainbow trout and white sturgeon are among the many species found in the river. Kokanee and rainbows are commonly found in Lake Koocanusa. Kootenai Falls, which drops some 17 metres (56 ft) within a run of a few hundred meters, forms a natural boundary between fishes of the upper and lower river, but Libby Dam, several kilometres upstream, is an even more formidable barrier. Fish in the Kootenay have traditionally been abundant but the construction of the dam may have led to declines in the population of sturgeon, among other fishes, because of changes in water flow. The best season for fishing is from June to November. One may fish from banks, sandbars and islands, or from boats. Because of the size and strength of the river, fishing from drift boats is easier than from the shore. Also, because the Kootenay's primary sources are glaciers, fishing conditions are quite different from most rivers in Montana and Idaho, which are fed by snowmelt. In the United States, the Kootenay, with its "exceptional" trout fishing, is considered a Blue Ribbon fishery.

=== Boating ===
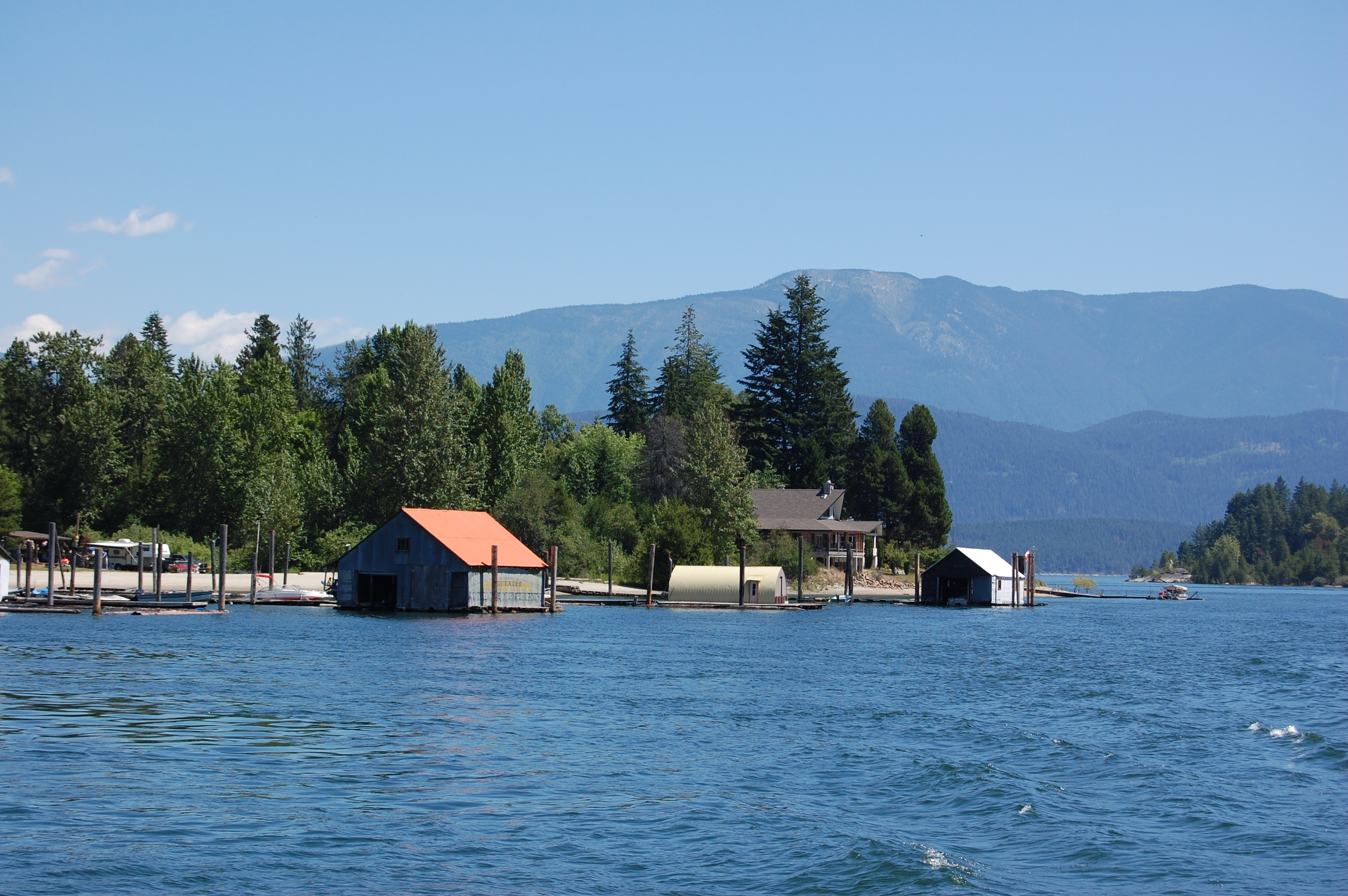
Boathouses on Kootenay Lake near Balfour, British Columbia

Steep and strewn with rapids, the Kootenay, despite being unsuitable for commercial transportation of agricultural and mineral products, is considered an outstanding whitewater river. Whitewater rafting is popular on the Kootenay in two stretches: in Jennings Canyon between the Libby Dam in Montana and Bonners Ferry in Idaho, and in the upper reaches of the river in Kootenay National Park in British Columbia.

Rafting the middle Kootenay between Libby Dam and Bonners Ferry is best at flows of 230 to 340 cubic metres per second (8,000 to 12,000 cu ft/s). The run, about 60 kilometres (37 mi) from east to west, includes Class IV+ rapids and includes Kootenai Falls, which rarely has been run safely, in the middle of its course. In Montana, the river is rated a Class I water under the Montana Stream Access Law for recreational purposes from Libby Dam to the Montana-Idaho border. Class I represents bodies of water that are navigable and suitable for recreation.

Rafting is also popular in some of the Canadian stretches of the river, especially those near the headwaters that have the steepest gradient and the most challenging rapids. Several Canadian outfitters provide trips on the river near Kootenay National Park ranging from a few hours to several days. Canoeing in the numerous sloughs, side-channels and distributaries of the Kootenay that thread through the wetlands of the Kootenay Flats has the additional benefit of watching birds and wildlife in the Creston Valley Wildlife Management Unit and other surrounding marshes. Larger craft such as houseboats are able to travel on Kootenay and Koocanusa Lakes. Rafting and kayaking is also an activity on the swift-flowing Slocan River, the lowermost major tributary of the Kootenay, and in parts of other major Kootenay tributaries as well.

== See also ==
- Confederated Salish and Kootenai Tribes – Native American tribe in Montana
- Dewdney Trail
- List of crossings of the Kootenay River
- List of dams in the Columbia River watershed
- List of longest rivers of Canada
- List of longest streams of Idaho
- List of rivers of British Columbia
- List of rivers of Idaho
- List of rivers of Montana
- List of tributaries of the Columbia River
- Montana Stream Access Law

== Works cited ==
- Basque, Garnet, ed. (1993). Frontier Days in British Columbia. Heritage Group Distribution. ISBN 1-894384-01-6.
- Brink, Nicky L; Bown, Stephen R. (2007). Forgotten highways: wilderness journeys down the historic trails of the Canadian Rockies. Brindle & Glass. pp. 131–134. ISBN 978-1-897142-24-0.
- Burpee, Lawrence Johnstone (1908). The search for the western sea: the story of the exploration of north-western America. Musson Book Company Ltd.
- Hayes, Derek (2006). Historical Atlas of Canada. Douglas & McIntyre. pp. 207–208. ISBN 1-55365-077-8.
- Holbrook, Stewart (1990) [1956]. The Columbia: The Classic Portrait of the Great River of the Northwest. Comstock Editions. ISBN 0-89174-051-1.
- Jenish, D'Arcy (2004). Epic wanderer: David Thompson and the mapping of the Canadian West. University of Nebraska Press. ISBN 0-8032-2600-4.
- Landers, Rich; Hansen, Dan; Huser, Verne; North, Doug (2008). Paddling Washington: Flatwater and Whitewater Routes in Washington State and the Inland Northwest. Mountaineers Books. ISBN 978-1-59485-056-1.
- Miller, Naomi (2002). Fort Steele: gold rush to boom town. Heritage Group Distribution. ISBN 1-894384-38-5.
- Palliser, John; Blakiston, Thomas Wright (1860). Exploration—British North America: Further papers relative to the exploration by the expedition under Captain Palliser of that portion of British North America which lies between the northern branch of the river Saskatchewan and the frontier of the United States, and between the Red River and …. Western Americana, frontier history of the trans-Mississippi West. G.E. Eyre & W. Spottiswoode for H.M. Stationery Office.
- "Introduction" (PDF). Kootenai Subbasin Plan. Northwest Power and Conservation Council. 2005-10-31. Archived from the original (PDF) on 2009-03-25.
- "Characterization of Biomes" (PDF). Kootenai Subbasin Plan. Northwest Power and Conservation Council. 2005-10-31. Archived from the original (PDF) on 2011-05-17.
- "Fish and Wildlife Communities" (PDF). Kootenai Subbasin Plan. Northwest Power and Conservation Council. 2005-10-31. Archived from the original (PDF) on 2011-05-17.
