= Fisher River (Montana) =

Fisher River Pleasant Valley Fisher River

Location
- Country: United States
- State: Montana
- Counties: Lincoln, Flathead

Physical characteristics
- Source: Pleasant Valley Fisher River
  - location: Salish Mountains
  - coordinates: 48°4′12″N 114°44′18″W
  - elevation: 4,130 ft (1,260 m)
- Mouth: Kootenay River
  - coordinates: 48°21′56″N 115°19′25″W
  - elevation: 2,110 ft (640 m)
- Length: 63 mi (101 km)
- Basin size: 838 mi^{2} (2,170 km^{2})
- Discharge
  - location: near mouth
  - average: 477 cu ft/s (13.5 m^{3}/s)
  - minimum: 35 cu ft/s (0.99 m^{3}/s)
  - maximum: 7,790 cu ft/s (221 m^{3}/s)

Basin features
- Tributaries
  - left: Silver Butte Fisher River, West Fisher Creek
  - right: Wolf Creek, Montana

The Fisher River is a tributary of the Kootenay River (spelled Kootenai in the United States) in the U.S. state of Montana. The Fisher River properly begins at the confluence of its two main tributaries, the Pleasant Valley Fisher River and the Silver Butte Fisher River. Of the two tributaries, the Pleasant Valley Fisher River is the larger and is sometimes considered part of the Fisher River proper. A variant name of the Fisher River is Pleasant Valley River, and a variant name of the Pleasant Valley Fisher River is Fisher River.

The river is part of the Columbia River basin, being a tributary of the Kootenay River, which is a tributary to the Columbia River.

== Course ==
The Pleasant Valley Fisher River originates in the Salish Mountains near Little Bitterroot Lake in Flathead County, Montana and flows northwest through Lost Prairie valley. It is joined by Pleasant Valley Creek just before crossing into Lincoln County, Montana, where the river flows southwest, through Loon Lake and Little Loon Lake, to join the Silver Butte Fisher River, forming the Fisher River proper.

Silver Butte Fisher River originates in the Cabinet Mountains and flows about 14 miles (23 km) northeast to join the Pleasant Valley Fisher River.

Downriver of the Pleasant Valley and Silver Butte confluence, the Fisher River flows generally north, picking up several tributaries including West Fisher Creek, Cow Creek, Wolf Creek, Fawn Creek, and Buck Creek, before emptying into the Kootenai River a few miles below Libby Dam and a few miles above Libby, Montana.

Part of Pleasant Valley Fisher River is paralleled by U.S. Route 2. The BNSF Railway's line through Flathead Tunnel and Marias Pass follows part of the lower Fisher River and its tributary Wolf Creek.

Much of the land of the Fisher River basin is privately owned, but a large portion lies within Kootenai National Forest.

== Natural history ==
The Fisher River's drainage basin has experienced higher levels of mining and logging operations than other nearby tributaries of the Kootenai River, such as the Yaak River and Moyie River. This has resulted in water quality impairment, stream channel degradation, and a relatively high amount of fine sediment in the water.

In the late 1960s, the Great Northern Railway (BNSF today) was rerouted along the lower ten miles (16 km) of Fisher River and most of Wolf Creek, a tributary. The streams were channelized and shortened during this time. Portions of Pleasant Valley Fisher River have also been channelized and shortened along U.S. Highway 2. All of these things negatively impact fish habitat in the Fisher River basin.

== History ==
According to the USGS, variant names for the Fisher River include: Bank Creek, Ma-su-la Creek, Pleasant Valley Fisher River, and Pleasant Valley River. Variant names for the Pleasant Valley Fisher River include: Bank Creek, Fisher Creek, Fisher River, Pleasant Valley Creek, and Pleasant Valley River. Variant names for the Silver Butte Fisher River include: East Fisher Creek, Fisher Creek, Galena Creek, Silver Butte Creek, Silver Butte River, West Fisher Creek, and West Fork Fisher Creek.

== See also ==
- List of rivers of Montana
- Montana Stream Access Law
- Tributaries of the Columbia River
