= Bull River (British Columbia) =

Location
- Country: Canada
- Province: British Columbia
- District: Kootenay Land District

Physical characteristics
- Source: Rocky Mountains
- Mouth: Kootenay River
  - coordinates: 49°28′N 115°27′W
- Length: 117 km (73 mi)
- Discharge
  - location: Near Wardner
  - average: 32.6 m^{3}/s (1,150 cu ft/s)
  - minimum: 0.82 m^{3}/s (29 cu ft/s)
  - maximum: 388 m^{3}/s (13,700 cu ft/s)

The Bull River is a 117-kilometre (73 mi) long tributary of the Kootenay River in the Canadian province of British Columbia. It is part of the Columbia River basin, as the Kootenay River is a tributary of the Columbia River.

== Course ==
The Bull River originates in the Rocky Mountains near the Continental Divide. It flows generally south and west, joining the Kootenay River east of Cranbrook.

== Aberfeldie Dam ==
Aberfeldie Dam is a run of the river powerhouse that was built on the Bull River in 1922. A new dam 27M tall was built in 1953. It is operated by BC Hydro. A $95-million redevelopment was completed in 2009 increasing capacity from 5MW to 24MW.

== See also ==
- List of rivers of British Columbia
- Tributaries of the Columbia River
