= Brilliant, British Columbia =

Human settlement in British Columbia, Canada

Coordinates: 49.323°N 117.644°W

Location of Brilliant in British Columbia

Brilliant is in the West Kootenay region of southeastern British Columbia. The locality is on the northeast side of the Columbia River, and on the west shore at the mouth of the Kootenay River. This minor residential area, west of Highway 3A, is part of Greater Castlegar.

== Earlier dwellers ==
Kp'itl'els, possibly meaning "end of a mountain range" or "come to an end", was the name of the Sinixt village. After dying out in the 20th century, a stone monument now commemorates the last Sinixt residents. In 1883, John Carmichael Haynes acquired land, and surveyed a townsite to be called Haynesville. Assumedly, the land reverted to the Crown following no activity. In the early 1900s, some regarded the area as Waterloo, but that settlement is generally placed farther south in today's lower Ootischenia.

== Doukhobor commune ==
In 1908, the Doukhobors bought 11 square kilometres (2,700 acres), which leader Peter Verigin named the village of Brilliant, describing the river as a clear diamond. One theory for the rename is that the pacifist group wanted to disassociate from the military connotation of a name like Waterloo. In 1913, the Brilliant Suspension Bridge over the Kootenay replaced the ferry that connected with the Ootischenia communes. Brilliant, the Doukhobor headquarters for Canada, included a jam factory, grain elevator, fruit packing shed, general store/post office, and train station.

Surplus wheat grown by communes on the Prairies came by railway boxcar either loose or as sacks of flour. The 1,100-cubic-metre-capacity (30,000 imp bu) grain elevator at Brilliant was completed in 1918. Each day, a wagon load of wheat was emptied from the structure, and taken to the 3.6-cubic-metre-per-day-capacity (100 imp bu/d) gristmill.

Verigin's main residence was in the business section, but he spent much of his time at other colonies. In 1922, his followers built "Besedushka" (pavilion in Russian) upon a rocky outcrop overlooking the settlement. The ornate, but small building was a place where Verigin could relax and meet special visitors. One evening in 1924, Freedomites burned down that location, and the schools at Brilliant and Ootischenia. The communes faced constant harassment from the nearby Freedomite group at Thrums.

By 1937, the commune was bankrupt. The next year, the National Trust Company Limited foreclosed upon the assets. Idle for five years, the grain elevator transferred to the government in 1942. The following month, a suspicious fire consumed the elevator.

== Later developments ==
The land subdivided, Brilliant became primarily a residential community that includes the Brilliant Cultural Centre and Verigin Memorial Park. On the river the suspension bridge still stands and just upriver is the Brilliant Dam.

In March 2021, the Ministry of Forests in partnership with the Sinixt Confederacy and Colville Confederated Tribes put restrictions and physical barriers in place to stop motorized vehicles from continuing to degrade the cultural and ecological values of the lower Brilliant area, also referred to as Brilliant Flats, through mud bogging and dirt biking.
