= Palliser River =

Coordinates: 50°27′17″N 115°39′18″W

The Palliser River is a tributary of the Kootenay River in the Canadian province of British Columbia. It is part of the Columbia River basin, as the Kootenay River is a tributary of the Columbia River.

The Palliser River is named in honor of John Palliser, whose Palliser Expedition explored the Canadian Rockies from 1857 to 1859.

== Course ==
The Palliser River originates in Height of the Rockies Provincial Park, in the Rocky Mountains on the west slopes of the Continental Divide. Its headwaters are located near Palliser Pass. The river flows south then west to join the Kootenay River. Albert River joins the Palliser River shortly before its confluence with the Kootenay River.

== See also ==
- List of rivers of British Columbia
- Tributaries of the Columbia River
