= Kootenai Falls =

Waterfall on the Kootenai River in Lincoln County, Montana, United States

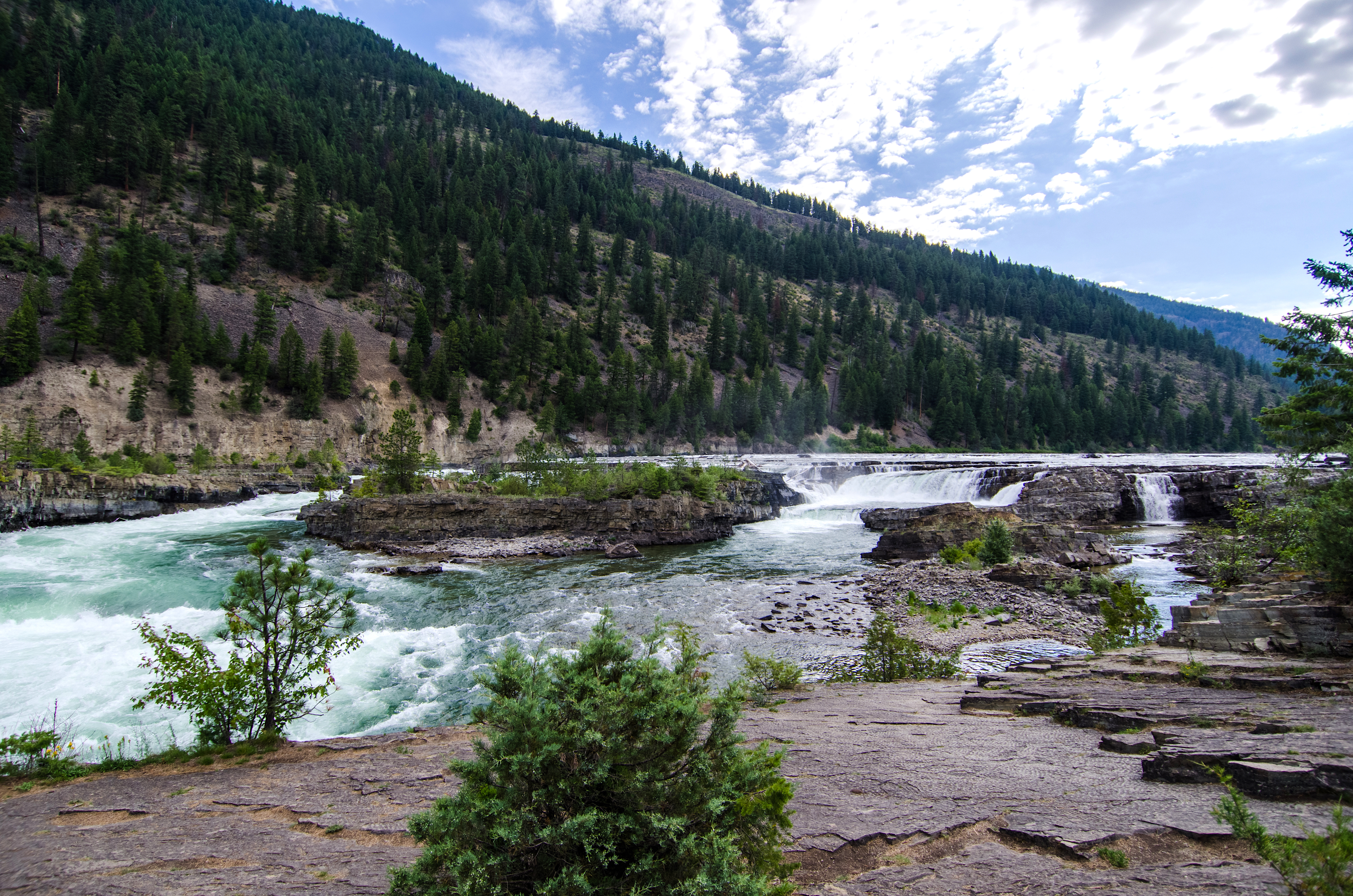
- Interactive map of Kootenai Falls
- Location: Lincoln County, Montana; United States
- Coordinates: 48°27′20″N 115°45′48″W
- Type: Plunge
- Total height: 17 metres (56 ft)
- Longest drop: 9 metres (30 ft)
- Average width: 258 metres (846.5 ft)
- Watercourse: Kootenai River
- Average flow rate: 731 m^{3}/s (25,820 cu ft/s)

Kootenai Falls is a waterfall on the Kootenai River located in Lincoln County, Montana, just off U.S. Route 2. It is the largest undammed waterfall in the state and one of the largest waterfalls in the United States by flow rate. The falls is accessed by a foot trail from the parking area next to the highway.

Historically a sacred site to the local Kootenai Tribe, the falls became a popular tourist destination in the 2010s due to the Kootenai Falls Swinging Bridge just downstream. The bridge was constructed in the 1930s by the Civilian Conservation Corps to help with the US Forest Service's firefighting efforts. It has been rebuilt twice, most recently in 2019 to facilitate better safety for the increasing number of visitors. The bridge and falls have made appearances in movies such as The River Wild (1994) and The Revenant (2015).

The area's ecology includes large animals such as bighorn sheep and American black bears, while the geology includes compressed, folded sandstone and shale dating back millions of years, with visible remnants of algae mats and water marks from when Montana was covered by water.

== History ==
The falls are considered a sacred site to the Kutenai Tribe. They see the falls as the centre of the world and a place where tribal members can commune with the spiritual forces that give direction to the tribe and to individual members.

In the early 1800s, David Thompson, a Canadian explorer and employee of the Northwest Company, travelled into the canyon and used the Kootenai River as a navigational guide through the area following Native Americans and game trails. He portaged around the falls, following cairns built by the Kutenai before continuing on upriver.

== Kootenai Falls Swinging Bridge ==
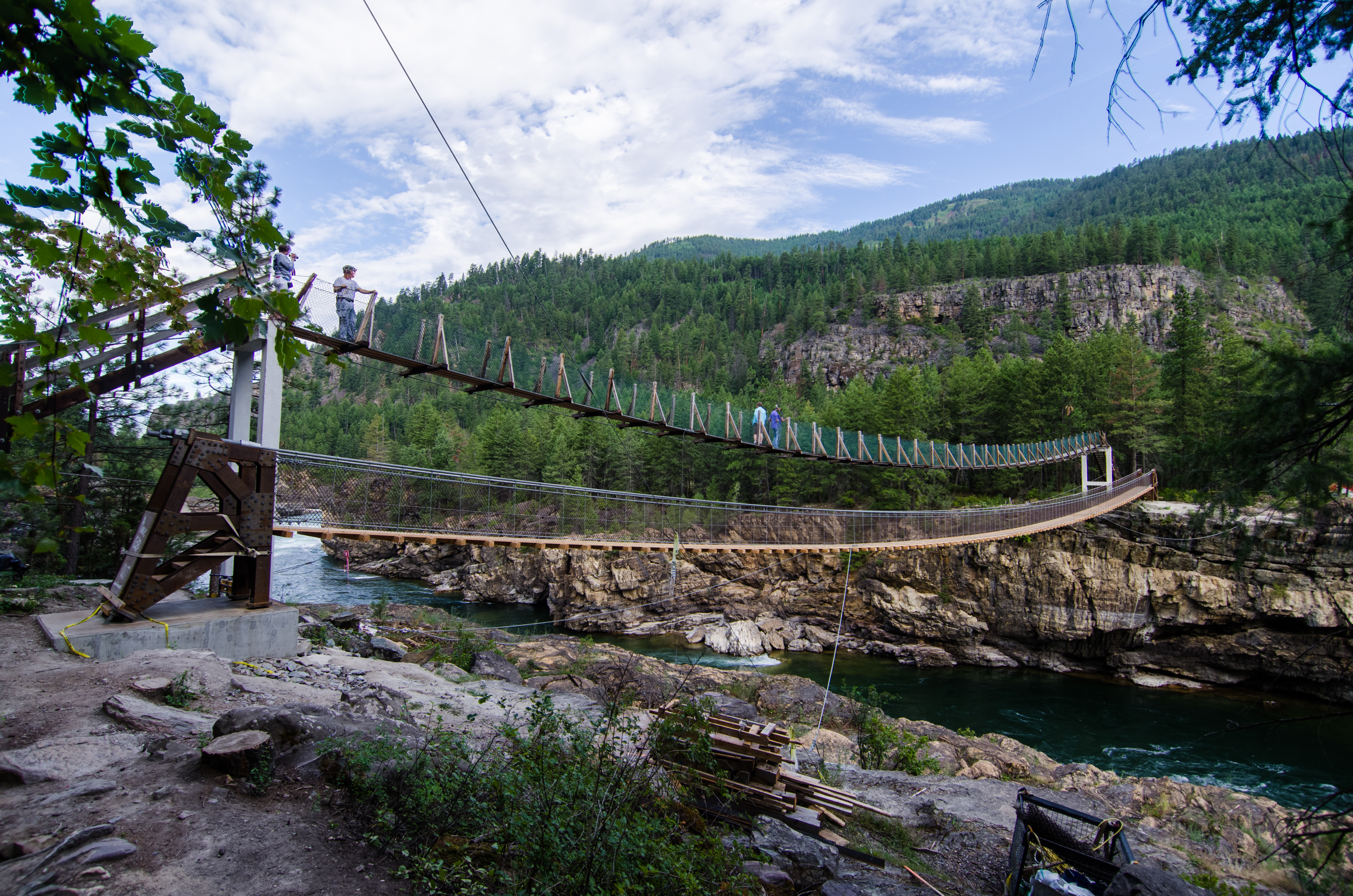
The Kootenai Falls Swinging Bridge in 2019

The Kootenai Falls Swinging Bridge, known to locals as just the Swinging Bridge, is a simple suspension footbridge that crosses the Kootenai River just downstream of Kootenai Falls. The bridge was first constructed by the Civilian Conservation Corps during the Great Depression, allowing the US Forest Service to better facilitate firefighter access to the forested mountains just north of the river. The bridge is open to the public and offers visitors elevated views of Kootenai Falls.

The original footbridge was destroyed during a flood in 1948. Shortly thereafter, a new footbridge was built atop a pair of concrete piers in order to overtake the historic flood stage of the river, and although the bridge was maintained and rehabilitated throughout the following decades, the bridge was rebuilt in 2019 due to its increasing popularity. The new bridge cost between $500,000 and $600,000 and was completed two months ahead of schedule.

== Geology and ecology ==
The Kootenai River Gorge is composed of "sandstone and thin layers of shale from the Mount Shields Formation of the Belt Supergroup, with folds from compression that dates back to the Sevier Orogeny 50 to 100 million years ago. The rock was deposited 1.5 billion years ago, when much of Montana was covered by water. Ancient ripple marks and large stromatolites (the remains of algae mats) are visible in the canyon."

Bald eagles may be spotted in nearby cottonwood trees. The nearby Wildlife Management Area is home to bighorn sheep, American black bears, moose, and many other animal species, while the plant life is described as "very diverse [...] most coniferous trees common to the Northwest can be found."

== Popular culture and recreation ==
The Kootenai Falls and Swinging Bridge were featured in the 1994 movie The River Wild, and the falls were featured in the 2015 movie The Revenant.

The falls are sometimes used for whitewater kayaking, though most boats need to be portaged, while the bridge is a popular tourist attraction. Rainbow trout may be fished above the falls. There is a picnic area nearby sponsored by the Libby chapter of Lions Clubs International. There are trails suitable for hiking, biking, and horseback nearby, and hunting and wildlife viewing are possible depending on species.

== Gallery ==
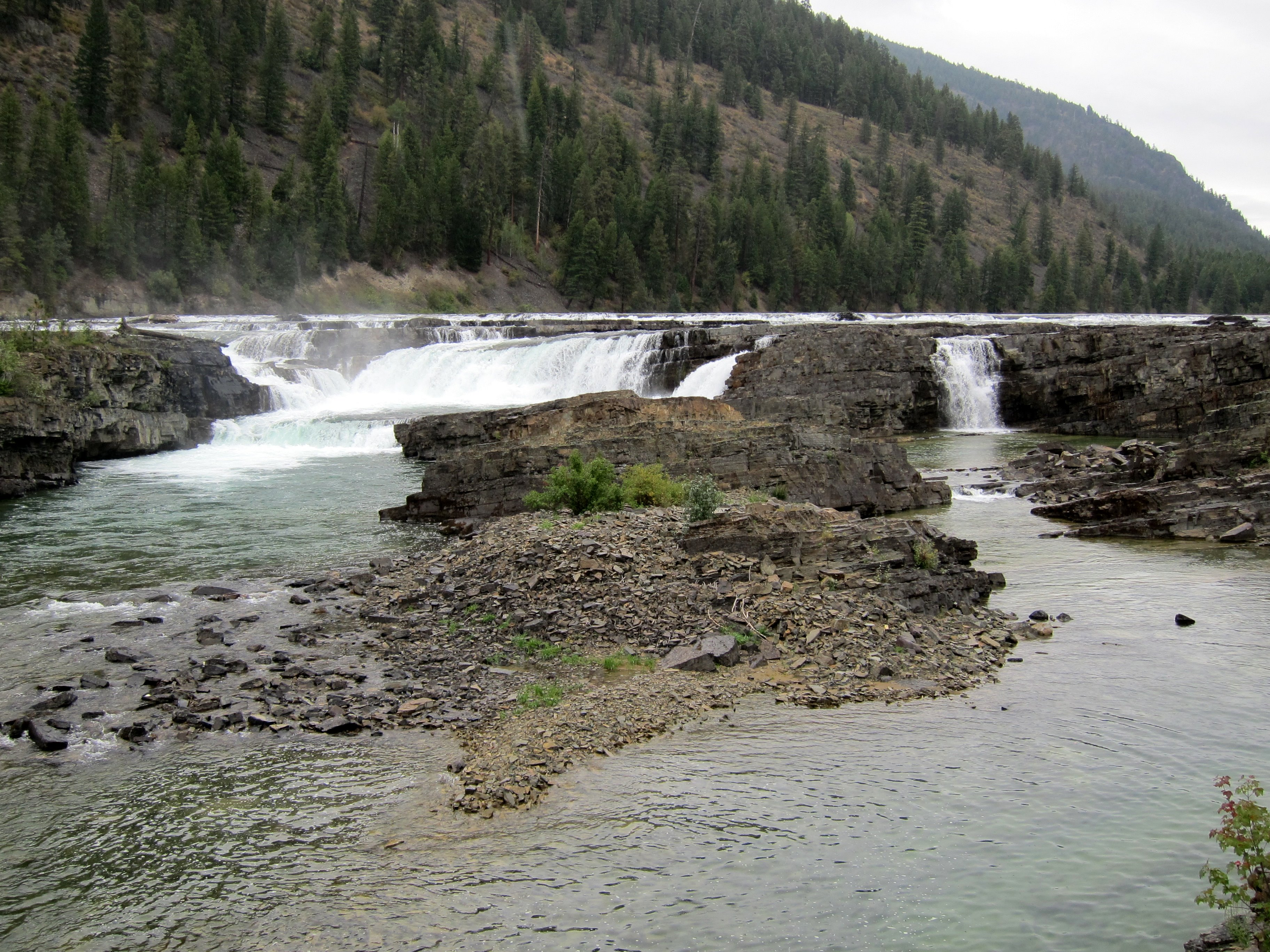

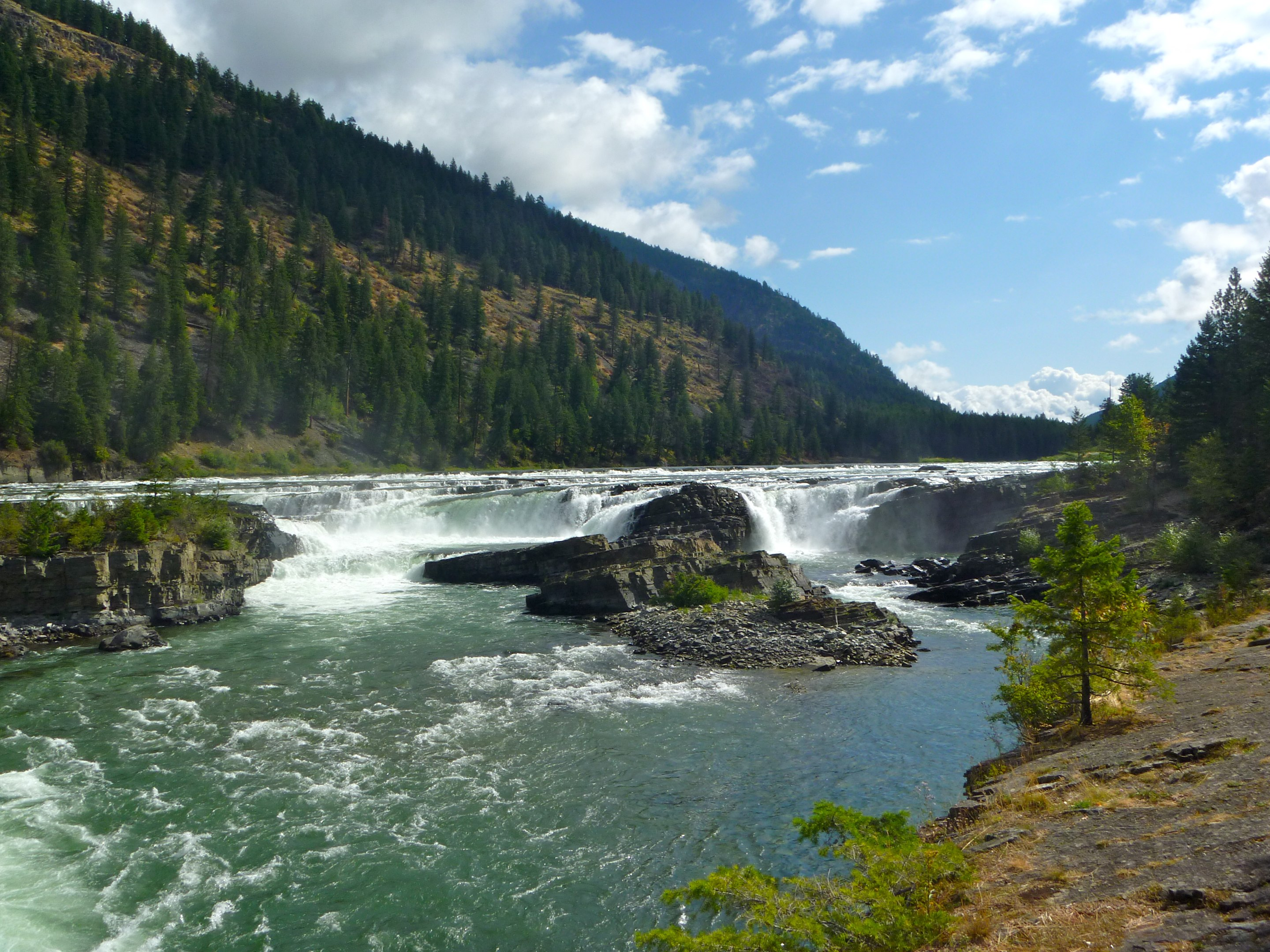

Solo whitewater kayaker on the Kootenai Falls

== See also ==
- List of waterfalls
- List of waterfalls by flow rate
- Libby, Montana
