= Kootenay Lake Provincial Park =

Provincial park in British Columbia, Canada

- IUCN category II (national park)
- Location within British Columbia
- Interactive map of Kootenay Lake Provincial Park
- Location: British Columbia, Canada
- Nearest city: Trail
- Coordinates: 49°22′22″N 116°48′36″W
- Area: 3.43 km^{2} (1.32 sq mi)
- Established: March 8, 1990
- Governing body: BC Parks

Kootenay Lake Provincial Park is a provincial park in British Columbia, Canada. It encompasses five widely dispersed parks around Kootenay Lake: Kootenay Lake Provincial Park (Davis Creek site), Kootenay Lake Provincial Park (Lost Ledge sites), Kootenay Lake Provincial Park (Midge Creek site), Kootenay Lake Provincial Park (Campbell Bay site), and Kootenay Lake Provincial Park (Coffee Creek site).

All of the parks are located in south central British Columbia.

Sites in Kootenay Lake Provincial Park
Site name	Area (ha)
Davis Creek and Lost Ledge sites	43
Midge Creek site	223
Campbell Bay site	25
Coffee Creek site	52
