= Hall Street Pier =

Pier in Nelson, British Columbia, Canada

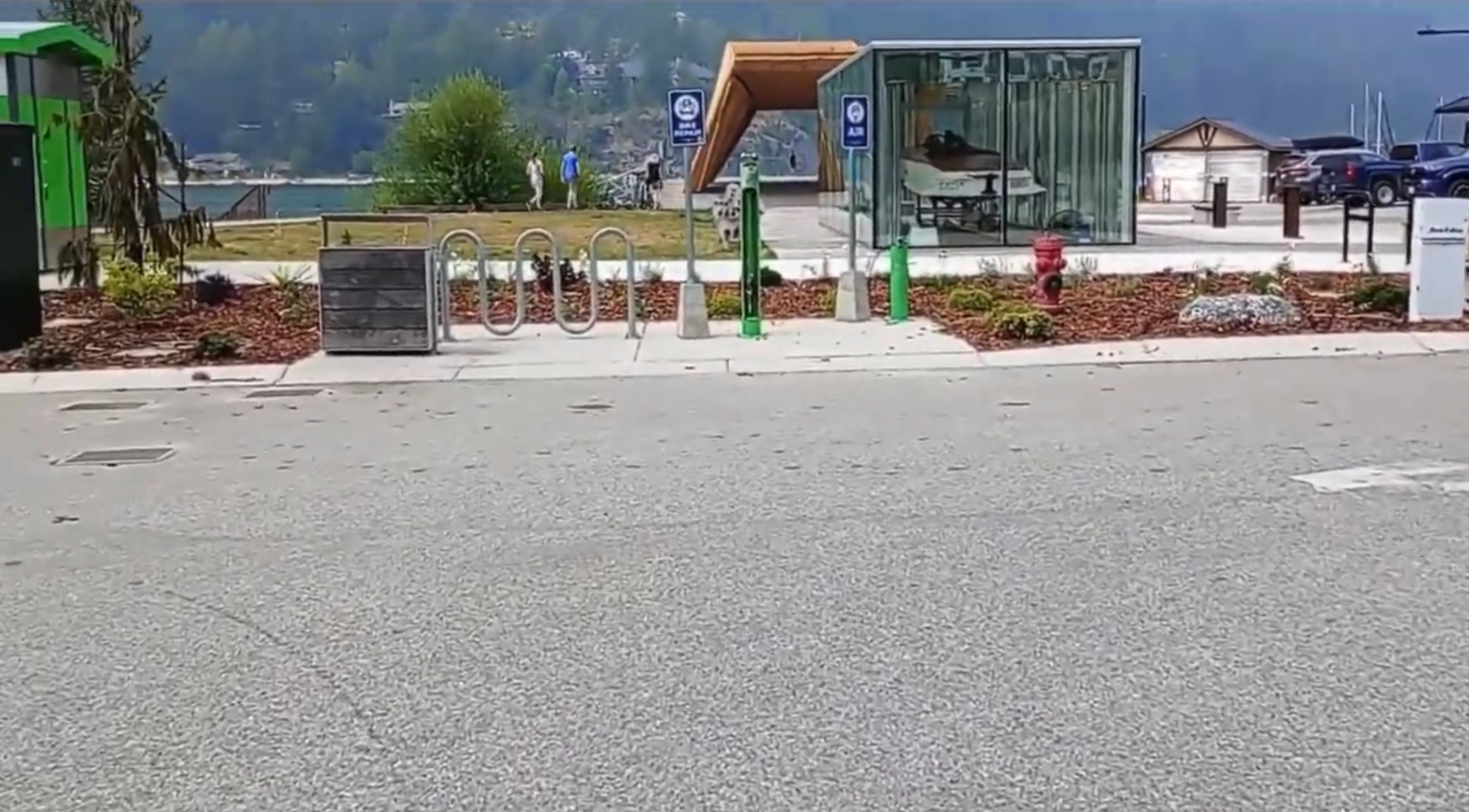
- The pier as it appeared in the YouTube video “The Nelson pier gets a renovation (Full tour)” by Ship Ahoy, filmed prior to the public opening

Location
- Location: Nelson, British Columbia
- Coordinates: 49°29′51″N 117°17′44″W

Details
- Opened: September 14, 2024
- Joins: West Arm of Kootenay Lake

The Hall Street Pier, sometimes referred to as the Nelson Pier, is a lake pier on the West Arm of Kootenay Lake in Nelson, British Columbia, Canada. It was officially opened to the public on September 14, 2024. The pier was designed by Matthew Stanley as a community gathering site that symbolizes the connection between the city and the lake. The pier includes a canopy, swimming area, recreational dock, and a large walking area. The canopy has a hybrid wood- and- steel design, and is intended to produce moiré lighting. The pier originally included the Ladybird speedboat, but it was removed in August 2024 due to temperature-control issues in the speedboat's shelter. The Ladybird, powered by a Liberty V-12 aircraft engine, won the 20-mile race of the Kootenay Lake Regatta 8 times.

== History ==
The site was a community gathering site for the Ktunaxa and Sinixt First Nations.

In 1892, a dock for paddle-steamers was built. The Nelson Rowing Club was founded as the Nelson Boat Club in 1896, after which rowing regattas were held on the lake. The Kootenay Launch Club was founded in 1903, and held an annual motorboat regatta until the 1950s.

The dock was destroyed by underwater dynamite in 1947, and the SS Moyie sailed its last voyage in 1957. A 216-foot long wharf was built in 1986.

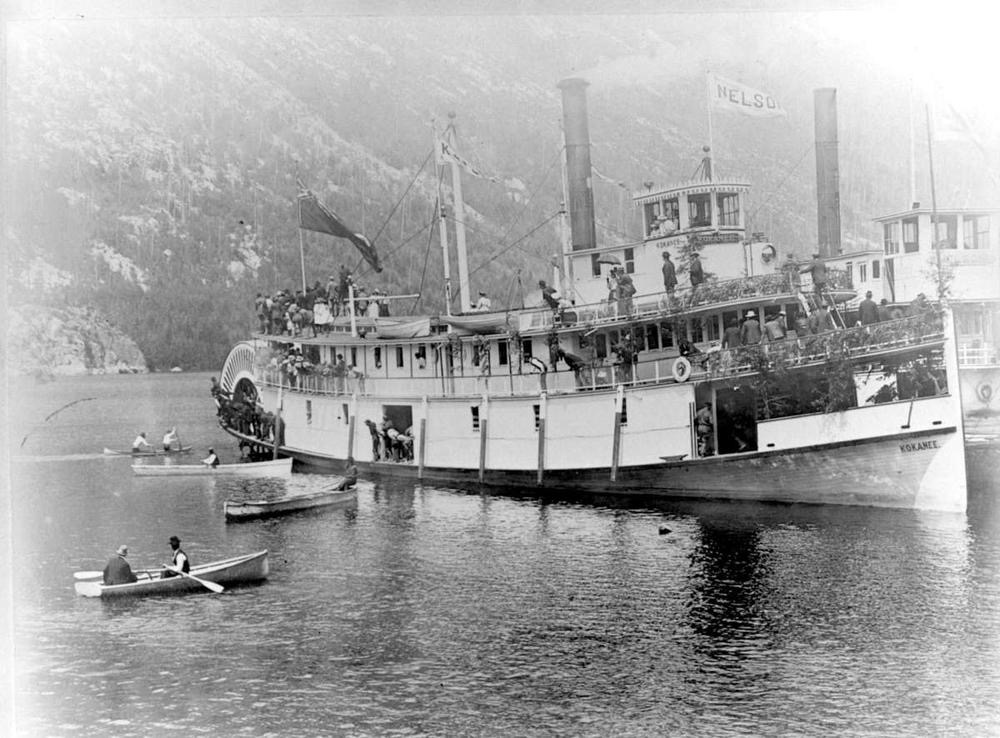
The dock in July 1896.

In 2020, it was announced that a new pier would be built to replace the deteriorating 1986 wharf as an economic stimulus project after the COVID-19 recession. A $1,000,000 grant for the pier's construction was given by the B.C. government as part of the Community Economic Recovery Infrastructure Program. A $500,000 CAD grant was given by the Columbia Basin Trust. The opening ceremony included a speech by mayor Janice Morrison.

In 2023, the pier was awarded a Canadian Architect award of excellence. In 2025, it won an AZ Award in Urban Design Interventions and Infrastructure.
