= Gilnockie Provincial Park =

Provincial park in British Columbia, Canada

- IUCN category II (national park)
- Location within British Columbia
- Interactive map of Gilnockie Provincial Park
- Location: Kootenay Land District, British Columbia, Canada
- Nearest city: Creston, BC
- Coordinates: 49°05′14″N 115°39′19″W
- Area: 2,842 ha (7,020 acres)
- Established: July 13, 1995
- Governing body: BC Parks

Gilnockie Provincial Park is a provincial park in British Columbia, Canada. This 2842-hectare park is situated southeast of Cranbrook and just north of the U.S. border. It includes the upper portion of Gilnockie Creek. Gilnockie Provincial Park protects some of the oldest fir and larch stands in the region where bears, moose, elk, white-tail and mule deer are found.

Although Gilnockie Park has low recreation values, this steep densely wooded and small wet valley encompasses wide-ranging species and habitat diversity and provides north south connectivity for many animals and birds. No facilities are provided. Visitors should be self-sufficient and proficient in backcountry travel practices.
