= Brilliant Suspension Bridge =

Suspension bridge over the Kootenay River

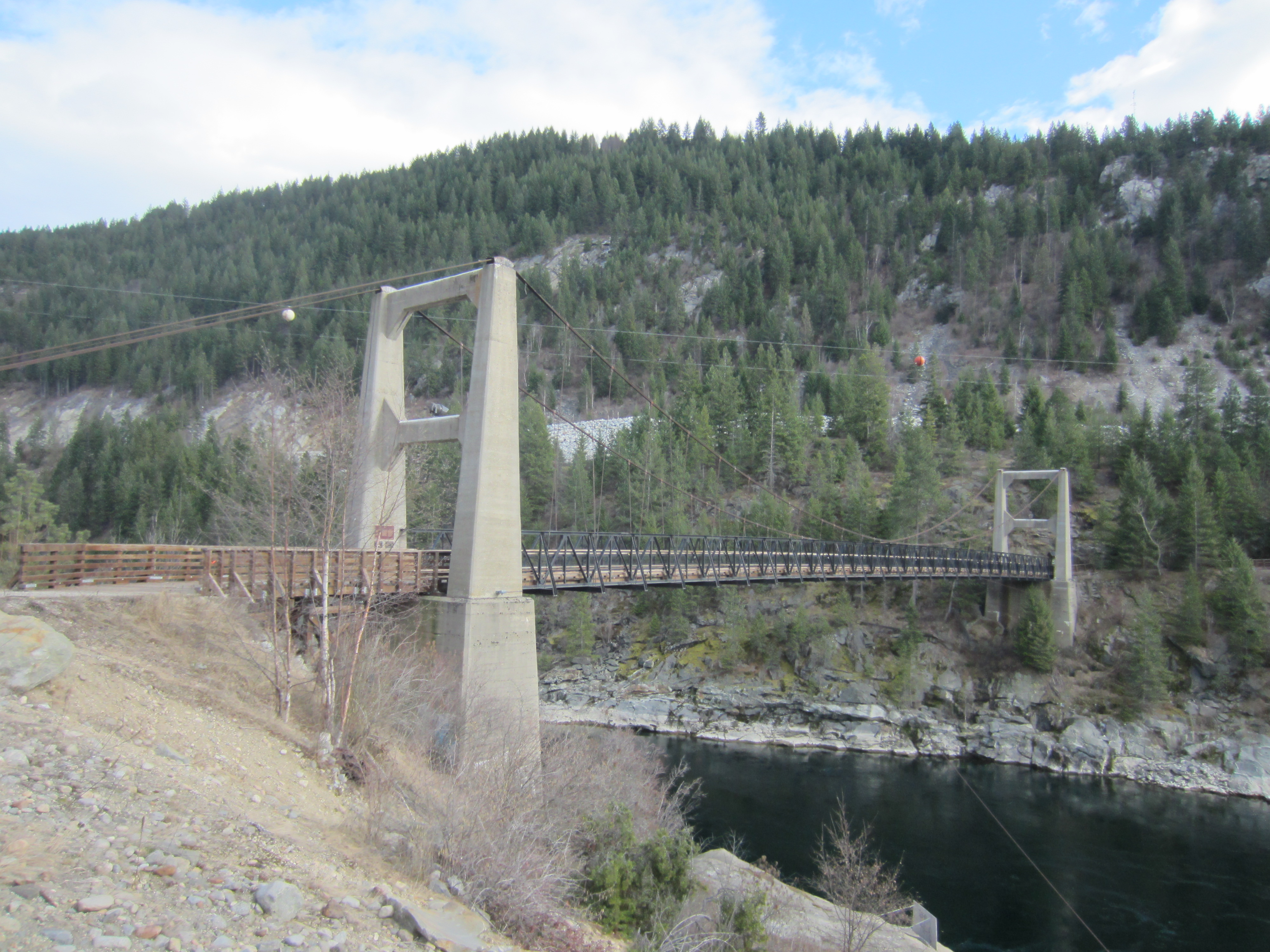
- Brilliant Suspension Bridge
- Coordinates: 49°19′3.05″N 117°37′46.89″W
- Carries: footbridge
- Crosses: Kootenay River
- Locale: Brilliant, British Columbia, Canada

History
- Opened: 1913; 1995
- Closed: 1966

Location
- Interactive map of Brilliant Suspension Bridge

The Brilliant Suspension Bridge is a suspension bridge over the Kootenay River near Castlegar, British Columbia. It was built in 1913 by Doukhobors settled in the area to replace a ferry across the river. In 1966, the new Highway 3A bridge replaced this one, and it was abandoned. Restoration began in the early 1990s, and the bridge was declared a national historic site in 1995. It reopened as a footbridge in 2010.

== See also ==
- Petrofka Bridge
