= Brilliant Dam =

Dam in Central Kootenay, British Columbia, Canada

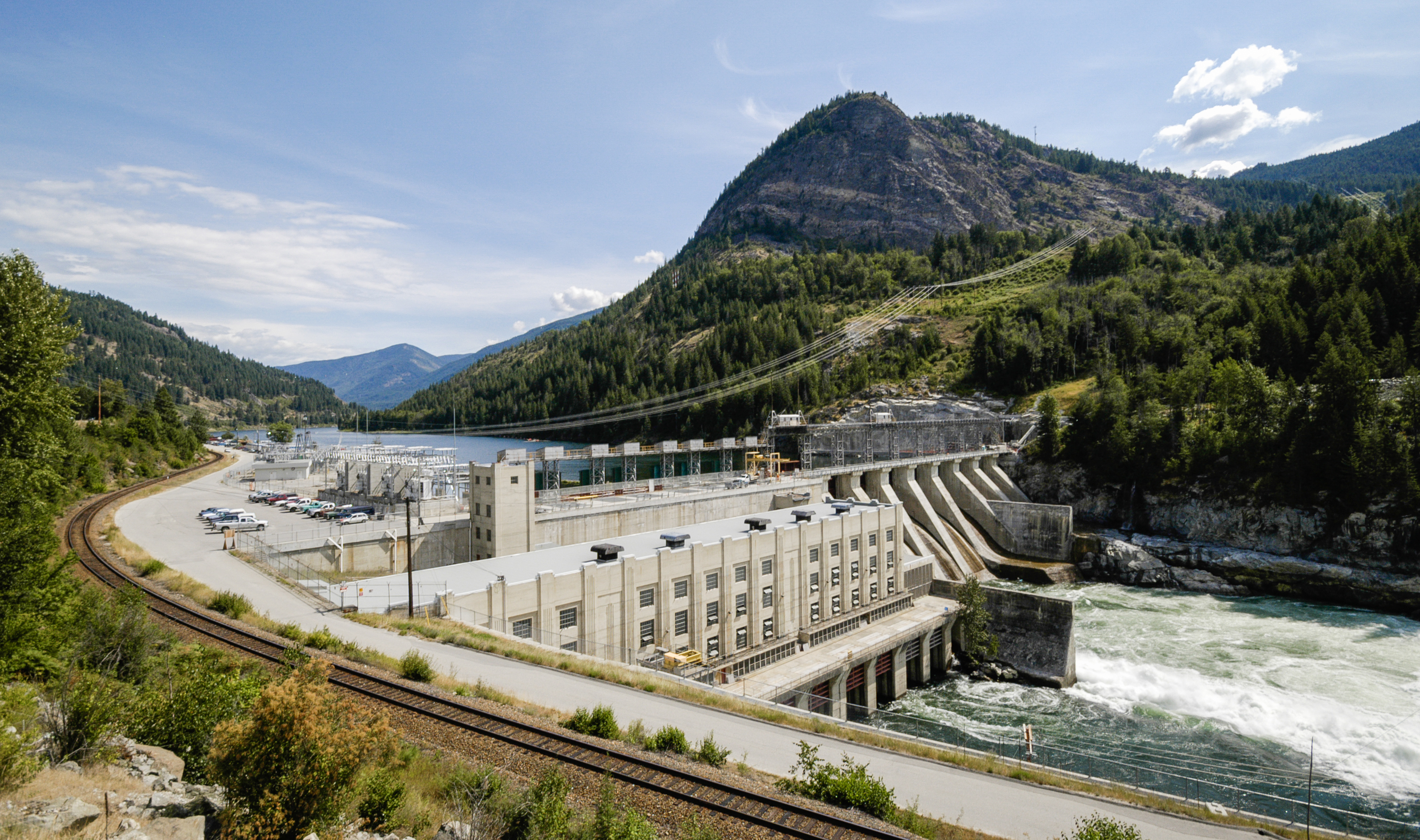
- Interactive map of Brilliant Dam
- Country: Canada
- Location: Central Kootenay; British Columbia
- Coordinates: 49°19′29″N 117°37′12″W
- Purpose: Hydroelectricity
- Status: Operational
- Opening date: June 1944

Dam and spillways
- Impounds: Kootenay River
- Height (foundation): 42.6 m (140 ft)

Power Station
- Hydraulic head: 28 m (92 ft)
- Installed capacity: 265 MW

Brilliant Dam is a hydroelectric dam on the Kootenay River near Castlegar, British Columbia, Canada. It was built during the Second World War, mostly by Doukhobor men exempt from military service, and its 129 MW twin turbines first came into operation in June, 1944. The Columbia Power Corporation purchased the dam from Teck Cominco in 1996.

== History ==
Brilliant Dam is 42.6 metres high, with a net hydraulic head of 28 metres, and eight sluice gates. In 2000, work began to increase flow and upgrade the generating units. Upon completion, its four turbines will generate a combined 145 MW of electricity.

In 2003, the Columbia Power Corporation began the Brilliant expansion project. The project includes the construction of an additional powerhouse on the left bank, housing a 120 MW Kaplan turbine which uses excess water beyond the capacity of the original powerhouse. Completed in 2007, it increased the combined generation of the dam to 265 MW.

Brilliant Dam is downstream of Kootenay River's 49 MW Corra Linn Dam, 583 MW Kootenay Canal and 600 MW Libby Dam.

== See also ==
- List of dams in the Columbia River watershed
- List of generating stations in BC
- Doukhobors
