= Kikomun Creek Provincial Park =

Provincial park in British Columbia

- IUCN category III (natural monument or feature)
- Location within British Columbia
- Interactive map of Kikomun Creek Provincial Park
- Location: East Kootenay, British Columbia, Canada
- Nearest city: Fernie
- Coordinates: 49°14′34″N 115°15′08″W
- Area: 0.68 square kilometres (0.26 sq mi)
- Established: May 18, 1972
- Visitors: 140,723 (in 2017-18)
- Governing body: BC Parks

Kikomun Creek Provincial Park is a provincial park in British Columbia, Canada.

Kikomun Creek Provincial Park has a campground with five lakes, an abundance of the endangered painted turtles, many mountain bike trails throughout, two beautiful sandy beaches among its attractions.

== Geography ==
Kikomun Creek is situated in the southern region of the Rocky Mountain Trench, on the eastern shores of a man-made reservoir along the Kootenay River. This 685-hectare park provides recreational access to Lake Koocanusa, whose name is supposedly a combination of Kootenay, Canada and United States. The park encompasses large open grasslands, ponderosa pine forests and many small lakes. The grasslands in the area were used historically as grazing areas for the horses of the Ktunaxa people and the cattle of early settlers. Throughout the park, evidence of glacial activity thousands of years ago is evident in the form of ridges, valleys and water-filled depressions.

Kikomun Creek Provincial Park is located 20 miles (32 km) southwest of Fernie and 41 miles (65 km) southeast of Cranbrook in the Canadian Rockies region of British Columbia.

== Ecology ==
Kikomun Creek Provincial Park is home to one of the British Columbia's largest populations of western painted turtles, which are named for their distinctive red and yellow markings on their undersides. These turtles are often seen sunbathing on logs on Hidden Lake and Surveyors’ Lake. The park's wetlands provide habitat for beaver, muskrat, long-toed salamanders, blue herons and mallards. Other wildlife in the area includes badgers, elk, black bears, coyotes, cougars and deer. For birdwatchers, the park is also home to osprey, owls, bald eagles, red-tailed hawks and American kestrels. As for plant life, the park includes many endangered plant species due to its geographic location. A program has been established to restore many of these native grasslands to the park.

For those interested in fishing, Hidden, Surveyors’, Engineers, Muskrat, Skunk and Fisher Lakes contain smallmouth bass, brook and rainbow trout. Koocanusa Lake contains bull, rainbow and westslope cutthroat trout, kokanee, and mountain whitefish. Watercraft are permitted on the lakes, however powerboats are restricted to Koocanusa Lake, which also has the only boat launch. During the summer months, educational interpretive programs are offered and include such events as guided walks, slide shows and children's programs.

== Amenities ==
The park provides camping, swimming, hiking, mountain biking and fishing, making it one of the most popular outdoor destinations in the East Kootenays. Surveyors’ Lake has sandy beaches, picnic areas and change houses. There are also some easy hiking trails that circle Hidden and Surveyors’ Lakes. Throughout the park, there are many old roads and railway beds that are perfect for mountain biking that lead to some interesting geological features.

There are 105 vehicle accessible campsites and two group campsites. The campsites vary in size and can accommodate everything from a large RV to a single tent. Park is open May 1 to September 30; campground gate is closed but gate for boat launch access is open during off-season. This campground is also wheelchair accessible. There are two yurts available approximately 2 km from the campground and can be reserved by phone only through Discover Camping.

== Nearby Towns ==
- Jaffray
- Elko
- Fernie
- Crowsnest Pass

== See also ==
- List of British Columbia Provincial Parks
