= Libby Dam =

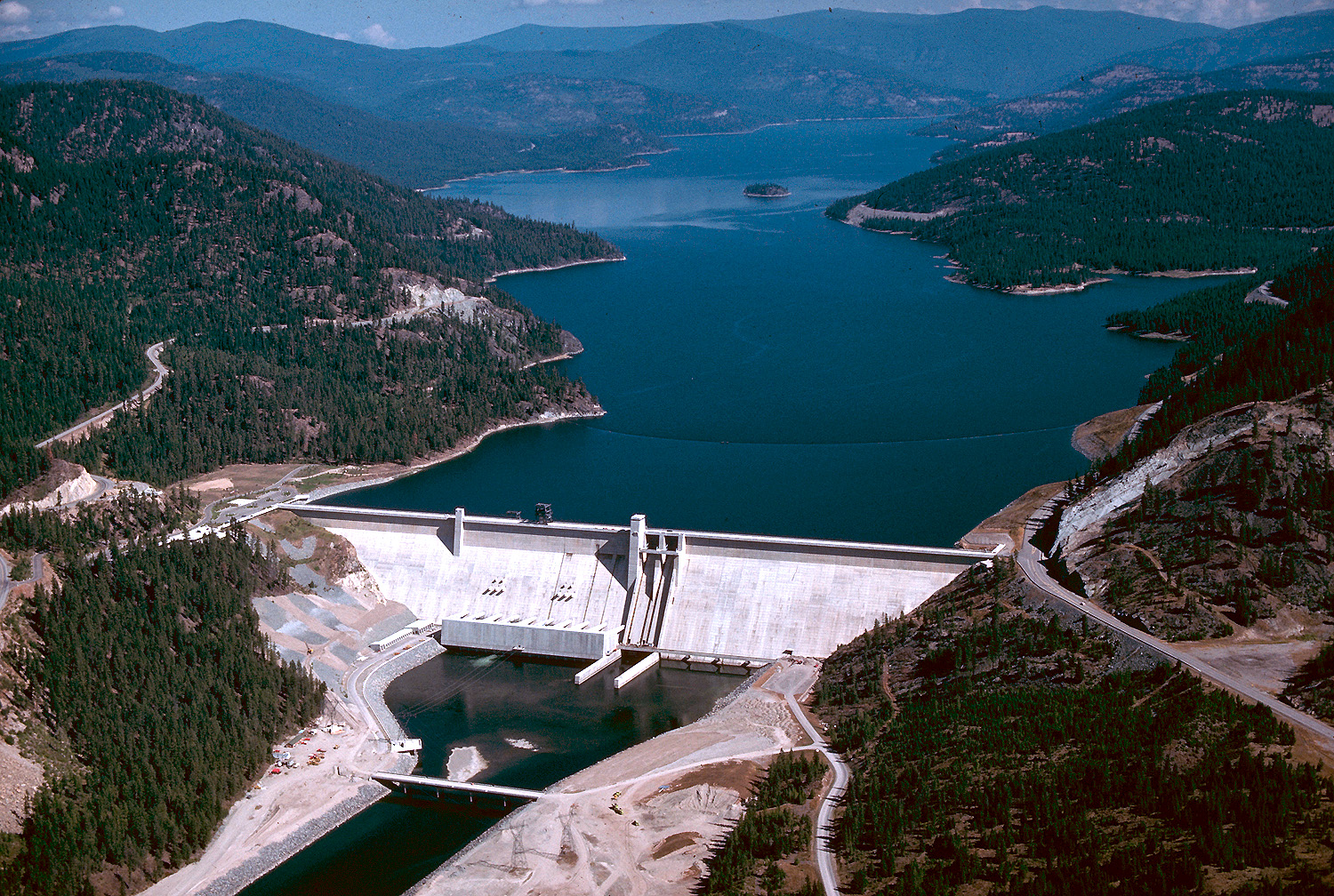
- Aerial view from southwest in 1986

- Location of Libby Dam Libby Dam (the United States)
- Country: United States
- Location: Lincoln County, Montana
- Coordinates: 48.41°N 115.314°W
- Opening date: August 24, 1975
- Owners: U.S. Army; Corps of Engineers

Dam and spillways
- Type of dam: Concrete gravity
- Impounds: Kootenai River
- Height: 422 ft (129 m)
- Length: 3,055 ft (931 m)
- Spillways: Gated overflow
- Spillway capacity: 160,000 cu ft/s (4,500 m^{3}/s)

Reservoir
- Creates: Lake Koocanusa
- Total capacity: 6,027,000 acre⋅ft (7.434 km^{3})
- Catchment area: 8,985 mi^{2} (23,270 km^{2})
- Surface area: 46,700 acres (18,900 ha)

Power Station
- Turbines: 5
- Installed capacity: 600 MW
- Annual generation: 1,574.4 GWh
- Website; U.S. Army Corps of Engineers - Libby Dam

Libby Dam is a concrete gravity dam in the northwestern United States, on the Kootenai River in northwestern Montana. Dedicated on August 24, 1975, it is west of the continental divide, seventeen miles (27 km) upstream from the town of Libby.

At 422 feet (129 m) in height and a length of 3,055 feet (931 m), Libby Dam created Lake Koocanusa, a reservoir which extends ninety miles (140 km) upriver with a maximum depth of about 370 feet (110 m). Forty-two miles (68 km) of it is in Canada in southeastern British Columbia.

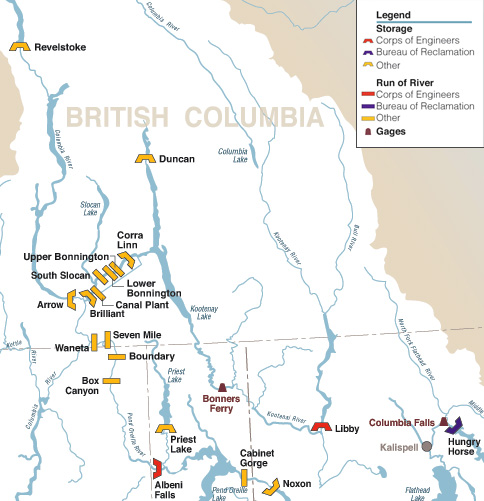
Map highlighting major dams and reservoirs in the Kootenai River watershed and surrounds

Lake Koocanusa was named for the treaty that was developed between the Kootenai Indians, the Canadian government, and the U.S. government to build the dam and form the reservoir. It was the fourth dam constructed under the Columbia River Treaty. The Kootenai River is the third largest tributary to the Columbia River, contributing almost twenty percent of the total water in the lower Columbia. Libby Dam has the capacity to hold back 4,980,000 acre-feet (6.14 km^{3}) of water.

The consulting architect for the project was Paul Thiry of Seattle, and the commission for its large granite bas-relief was awarded to sculptor Albert Wein by competition.

In order to make way for the dam, the town of Rexford was relocated and a new Flathead Railroad Tunnel was dug. Construction began in 1966, and the reservoir was available for filling in mid-1973.

The dam is operated by the U.S. Army Corps of Engineers and at full capacity, it can pass over 160,000 cubic feet per second (4,500 m^{3}/s) of water. The dam is designed with a selective withdrawal system that allows water passage from various levels of Lake Koocanusa, which allows the operators to moderate water temperatures downstream. The river continues northwest into Idaho, past Bonners Ferry, to Kootenay Lake in Canada and joins the Columbia River.

Libby Dam's powerhouse contains five turbines and is capable of generating 600 megawatts. The electricity is managed by the Bonneville Power Administration and services eight states: Montana, Idaho, Washington, Wyoming, California, Utah, Oregon, and Nevada. The money earned from electricity sales goes to the United States Treasury to repay the cost of building and operating Libby Dam.

President Gerald Ford was among the five thousand in attendance at the opening in 1975, along with Senator Mike Mansfield, the majority leader, and Governor Thomas Judge. At his first official event after a two-week vacation in Vail, Colorado, Ford "threw the switch" with Donald Macdonald, Canadian minister of energy.

== See also ==
- List of dams in the Columbia River watershed
