= BC Hydro =

Crown corporation in British Columbia, Canada

British Columbia Hydro and Power Authority
- Trade name: BC Hydro
- Type: Crown Corporation
- Industry: Electric utility
- Founded: 1961
- Headquarters: 333 Dunsmuir Street; Vancouver, British Columbia; V6B 5R3
- Area served: British Columbia
- Key people: Charlotte Mitha, President & CEO
- Products: Electricity generation, transmission and distribution
- Revenue: ▲CA$7.591 billion (2022)
- Net income: ▼CA$668 million (2022)
- Total assets: ▲CA$42.734 billion (2022)
- Owner: Government of British Columbia
- Number of employees: 6128 (2011)
- Website: www.bchydro.com

The British Columbia Hydro and Power Authority, operating as BC Hydro, is a Canadian electric utility in the province of British Columbia. It is the main electricity distributor, serving more than 4 million customers in most areas, with the exception of the City of New Westminster, where the city runs its own electrical department and portions of the West Kootenay, Okanagan, the Boundary Country and Similkameen regions, where FortisBC, a subsidiary of Fortis Inc. directly provides electric service to 213,000 customers and supplies municipally owned utilities in the same area. As a provincial Crown corporation, BC Hydro reports to the BC Ministry of Energy, Mines and Low Carbon Innovation, and is regulated by the British Columbia Utilities Commission (BCUC). Its mandate is to generate, purchase, distribute and sell electricity.

BC Hydro operates 32 hydroelectric facilities and two natural gas-fuelled thermal power plants. As of 2014, 95 per cent of the province's electricity was produced by hydroelectric generating stations, which consist mostly of large hydroelectric dams on the Columbia and Peace rivers. BC Hydro's various facilities generate between 43,000 and 54,000 gigawatt hours of electricity annually, depending on prevailing water levels. BC Hydro's nameplate capacity is 12,049 megawatts.

Electricity is delivered through a network of 18,286 kilometres of transmission lines operating from 69 kV to 500 kV, and 55,254 kilometres of distribution lines. BC Hydro has two major intertie paths, with its system being interconnected to the Alberta Electric System Operator via WECC Path 1, and to the Bonneville Power Administration via WECC Path 3.

For the 2013-2014 fiscal year, the domestic electric sales volume was 53,018 gigawatt hours, revenue was CA$5.392 billion and net income was CA$549 million.

== History ==
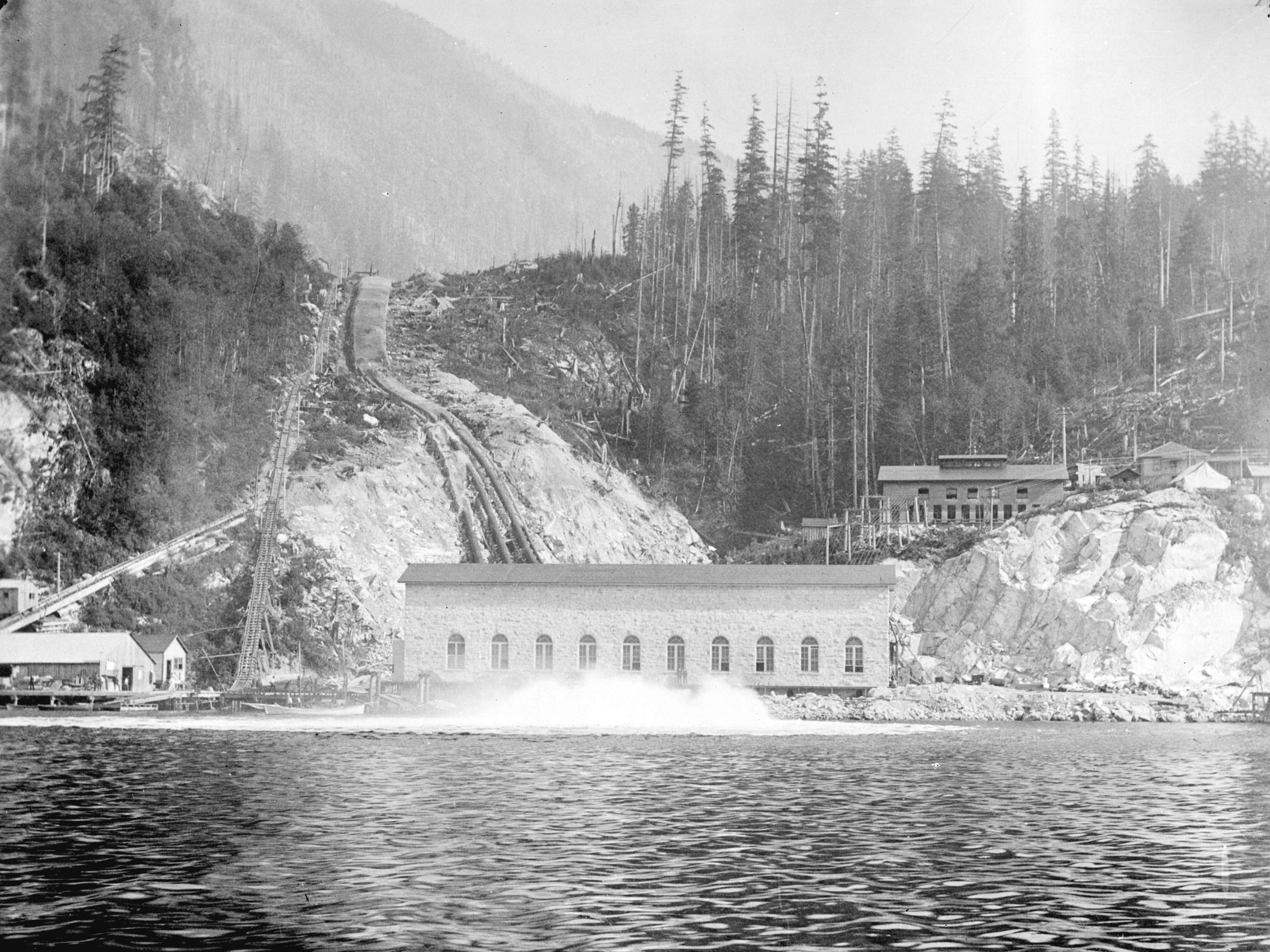
Buntzen Lake Power Plant #1 in 1907 from BC Electric Company, a company which would ultimately become BC Hydro through legislative action.

BC Hydro was created in 1961 when the government of British Columbia, under Premier W. A. C. Bennett, passed the BC Hydro Act. This act led to the expropriation of the BC Electric Company and its merging with the BC Power Commission, to create the British Columbia Hydro and Power Authority (BCHPA).

The BC Power Commission had been established with the Electric Power Act in 1945 by Premier John Hart. The mandate of the Power Commission was to amalgamate existing power and generating facilities across the province not served by BC Electric, and to extend service to the many smaller communities without power.

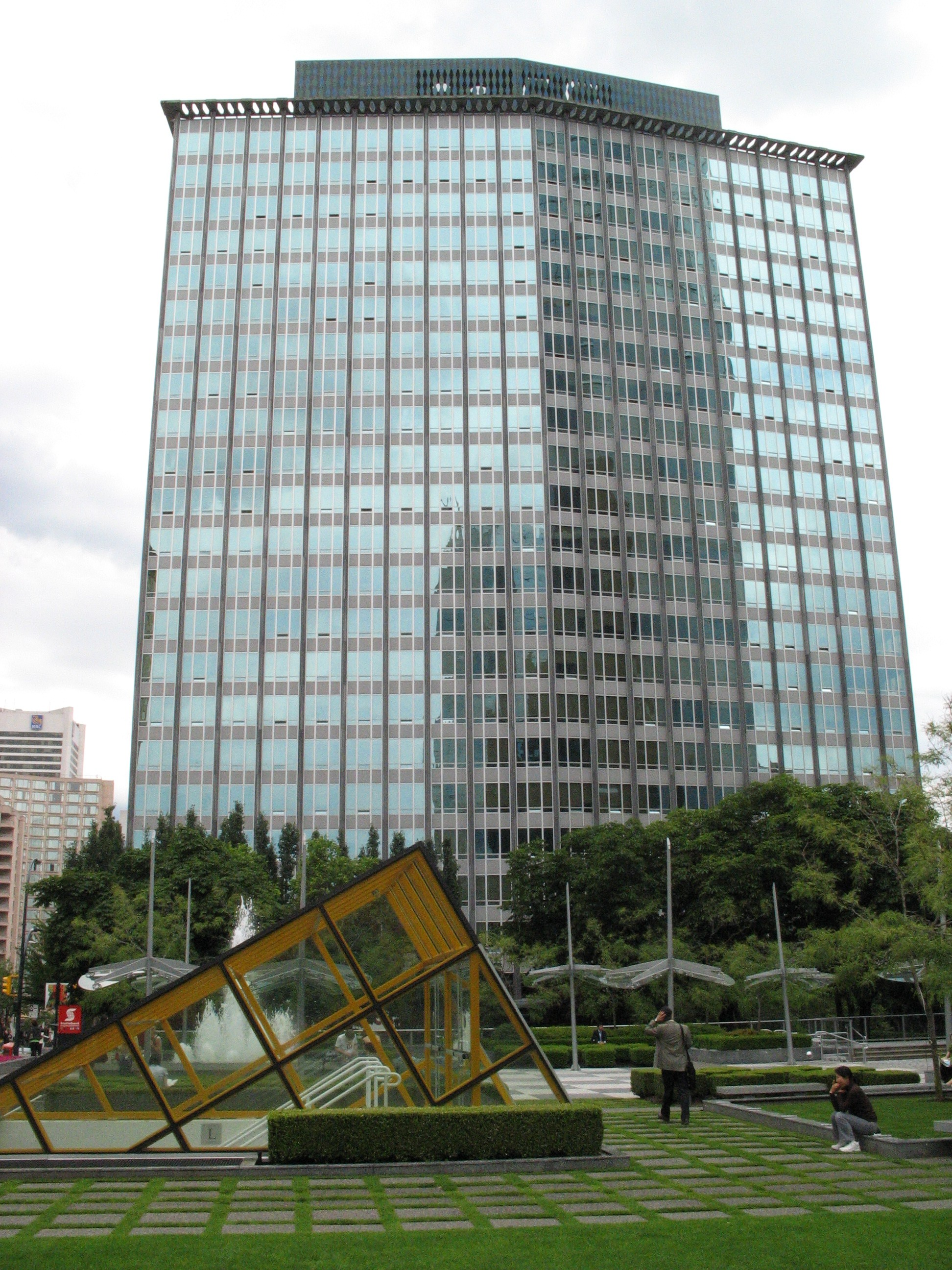
In 1957 BC Electric Company moved from its Carrall Street headquarters to a modern 21 storey building on Burrard Street. In 1998, it was converted to condominiums and renamed the Electra Building.

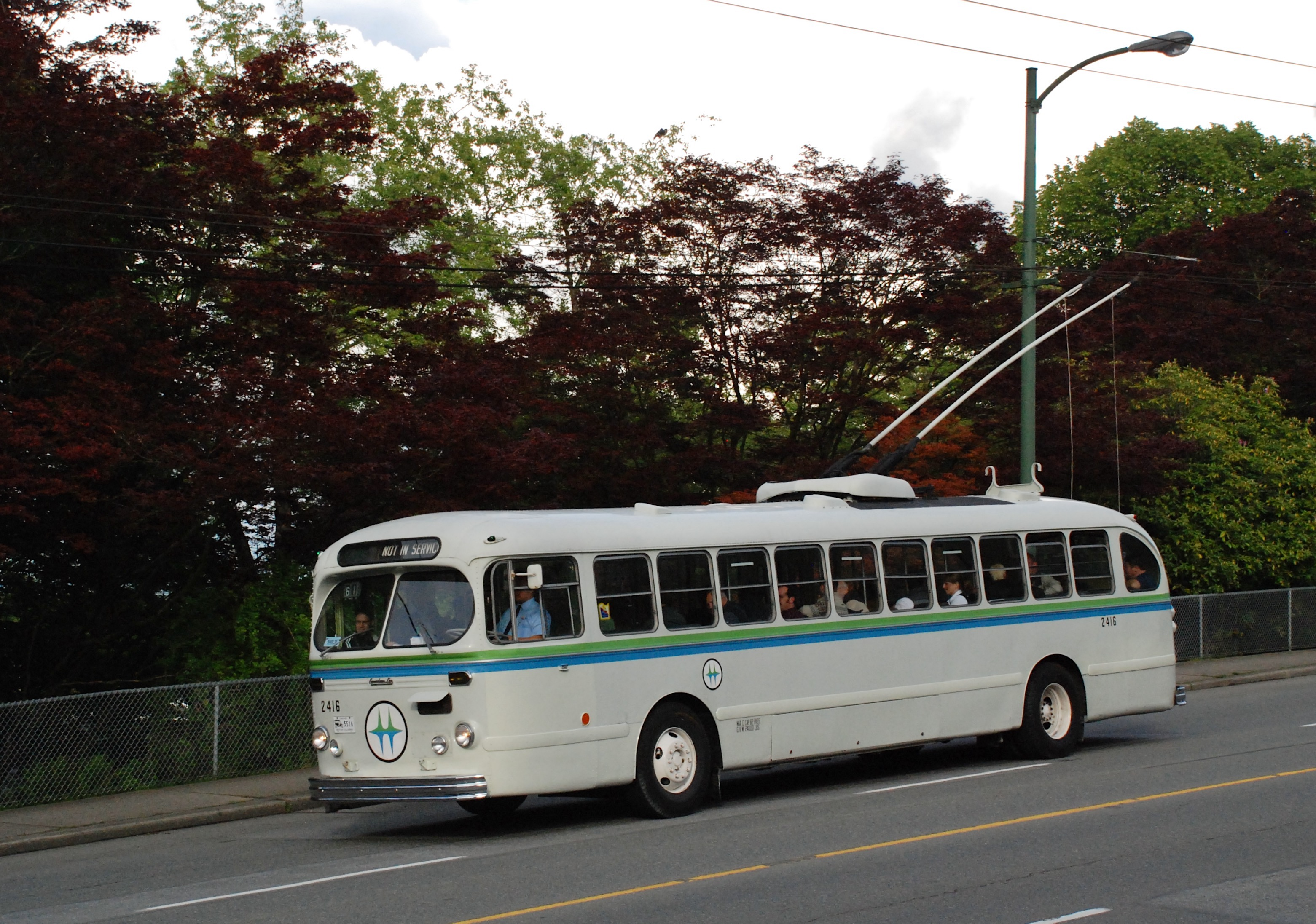
A 1954 Brill trolley bus that has been preserved in a paint scheme adopted by BC Hydro in 1962. Note Hydro logo on front.

BC Electric Company began as the British Columbia Electric Railway (streetcar and lighting utility) in Victoria, Vancouver and New Westminster in 1897. Power was generated by coal-fired steam plants. Increasing demand in the Edwardian boom years meant BC Electric sought expansion through developing Hydro power at Buntzen Lake, and later at Stave Lake. Sensible growth and expansion of the power, streetcar and coal gas utilities meant that BC Electric was a major company in the region.

Also about this time, sawmills and factories converted to electricity, further increasing the demand for electric power. BC Electric developed more hydro stations in the province. Similarly, small towns also built and operated their own power stations. More power transmission lines were also built. Dams and hydro-electric generating stations were built on Vancouver Island on the Puntledge, Jordan, and Elk rivers in the 1920s.

By the time of the First World War, private cars and jitneys were beginning to affect streetcar traffic. New dams were planned, including the diversion from the Bridge River to Seton Lake, near Lillooet, but the economic depression of the 1930s halted this business expansion. Also with the depression came an increase in the ridership, and a decrease in the maintenance of the streetcar system. In 1947, the BC Power Commission completed the John Hart Generating Station at Campbell River. In the early 1950s the ageing streetcars and interurban trains were replaced by electric trolley buses, and diesel buses. BC Electric finally completed the Bridge River Generating Station in 1960.

In 1958, BC Electric began construction of the oil-fired (later converted to natural gas) Burrard Generating Station near Port Moody. It opened in 1961 and operated only intermittently when needed. In 2001, it represented over 9% of BC Hydro's gross metered generation. The gas fired boilers at the Burrard Generating Station were decommissioned in 2016 to reduce reliance on fossil fuels, and the plant continues to be used as synchronous condenser facility.

On August 1, 1961, just days after company president Dal Grauer died, the BC government passed the legislation which changed BC Electric from a private company to a crown corporation known as BC Hydro.

The new corporation's responsibility including running the portions of the BC Electric Railway route still operating, for mass transit operation of the Vancouver trolley bus system (comprising a portion of the urban bus routes in Vancouver), as well as all the electric generation, transmission, and distribution operations.

In 1988, BC Hydro sold its Gas Division which distributed natural gas in the Lower Mainland and Victoria to Inland Natural Gas. Inland changed its name to BC Gas, and was sold and changed name again to Terasen Gas in 2003. In 2007 Terasen sold the gas operation to FortisBC.

In 1988, BC Hydro's remaining railway operations were sold to the Southern Railway of British Columbia. BC Hydro continues to own the railbed of the former BC Electric Railway interurban route through Burnaby and New Westminster (on which a portion of the Skytrain Expo Line was built), as well as the railway from North Delta through Surrey, Langley, and Abbotsford all the way to Chilliwack (which continues to be operated by Southern Rail). A segment of the BC Hydro route through Langley is also leased to BC Rail to link the Canadian National Railway mainline, Burlington Northern Santa Fe, and the Roberts Bank Superport.

In 2003 the BC government passed several pieces of legislation to redefine and regulate power utilities in British Columbia. The Transmission Corporation Act created the British Columbia Transmission Corporation (BCTC) as an independent transmission provider, but which only lasted until 2010 until being re-merged back into BC Hydro.

Also in 2003, BC Hydro privatized and outsourced many of its support functions, including 1540 of its employees in its Customer Service, Westech IT Services, Network Computer Services, Human Resources, Financial Systems, Purchasing, and Building and Office Services groups. These services were first outsourced to Accenture, and later to Telus and Fujitsu.

In the final week of August, 2015, the company experienced what it then described as its largest blackout event after a windstorm hit the South Coast on August 29–30, 2015. It affected more than 710,000 residents living in the Lower Mainland and Vancouver Island regions of the Canadian province of British Columbia and lasted more than 72 hours for some neighbourhoods. This blackout was surpassed by an outage caused by a 2018 winter storm that left 750,000 without power.

== Modern era ==
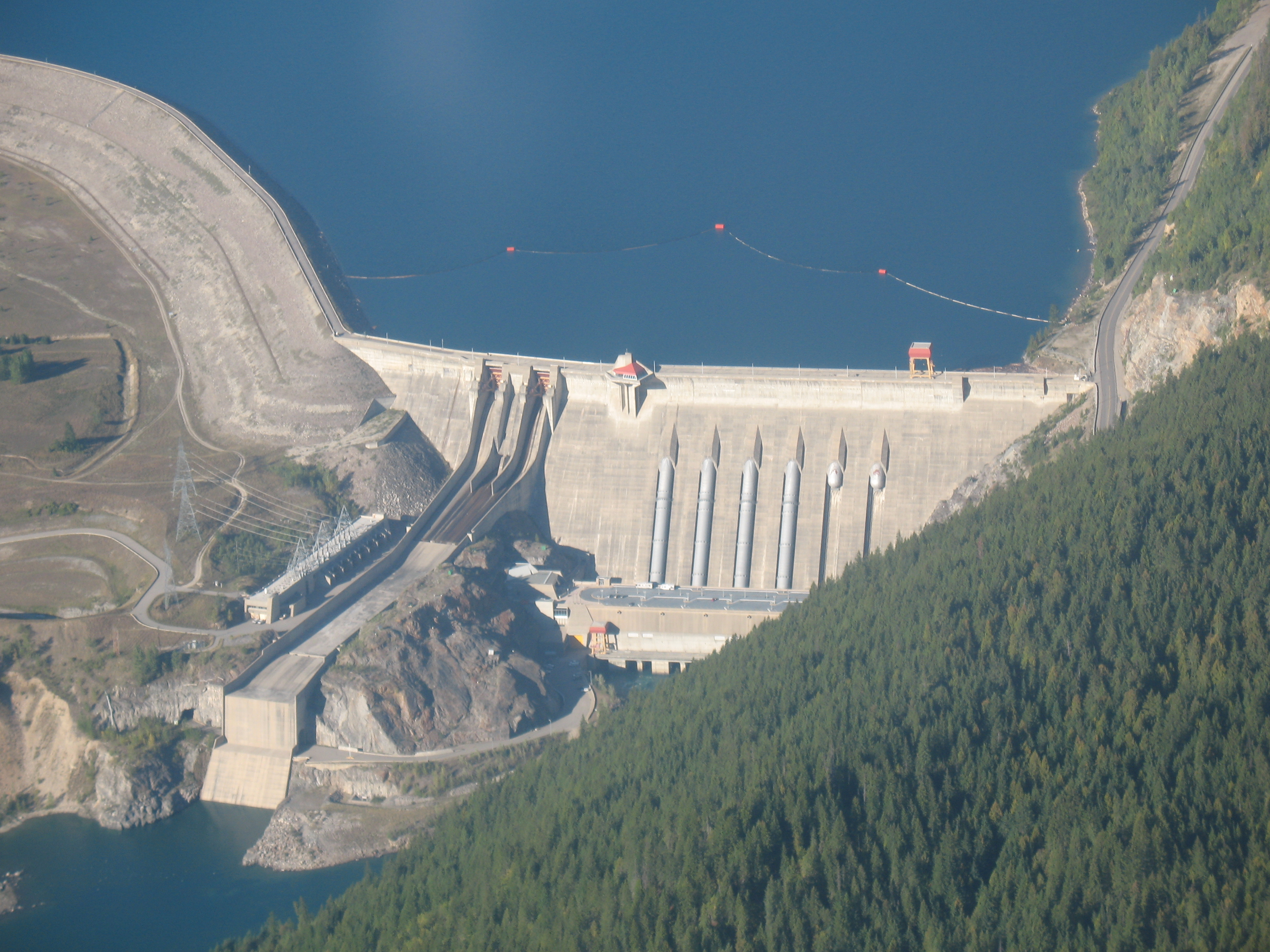
Revelstoke Dam on Columbia River, BC

Between 1960 and 1980, BC Hydro completed six large hydro-electric generating projects. The first large dam was built on the Peace River near Hudson's Hope. The W. A. C. Bennett Dam was built to create an energy reservoir for the Gordon M. Shrum Generating Station, which has a capacity of 2,730 Megawatts of electric power and generated 13,810 gigawatt-hours of electricity per year on average 2012–16. When it was completed in 1968, the dam was the largest earth-fill structure ever built. The Williston Lake reservoir is the largest lake in British Columbia. A second smaller concrete dam was later built downstream, closer to Hudson's Hope for the Peace Canyon Generating Station which was completed in 1980.

Under the terms of the Columbia River Treaty with the US, BC Hydro built a number of dams and hydro-electric generating stations including two large projects at Mica and Revelstoke on the Columbia River. The Keenleyside Dam on the Columbia River north of Castlegar and the Duncan Dam north of Kootenay Lake were also built under the same treaty and are used mainly for water control. Two generators were installed at Keenleyside in 2002, though these are owned and operated by the Columbia Power Corporation (a separate Crown Corporation). Kootenay Canal Generating Station on the Kootenay River between Nelson and Castlegar was completed in 1976. The Seven Mile Dam and Generating Station on the Pend d'Oreille River near Trail were completed in 1979.

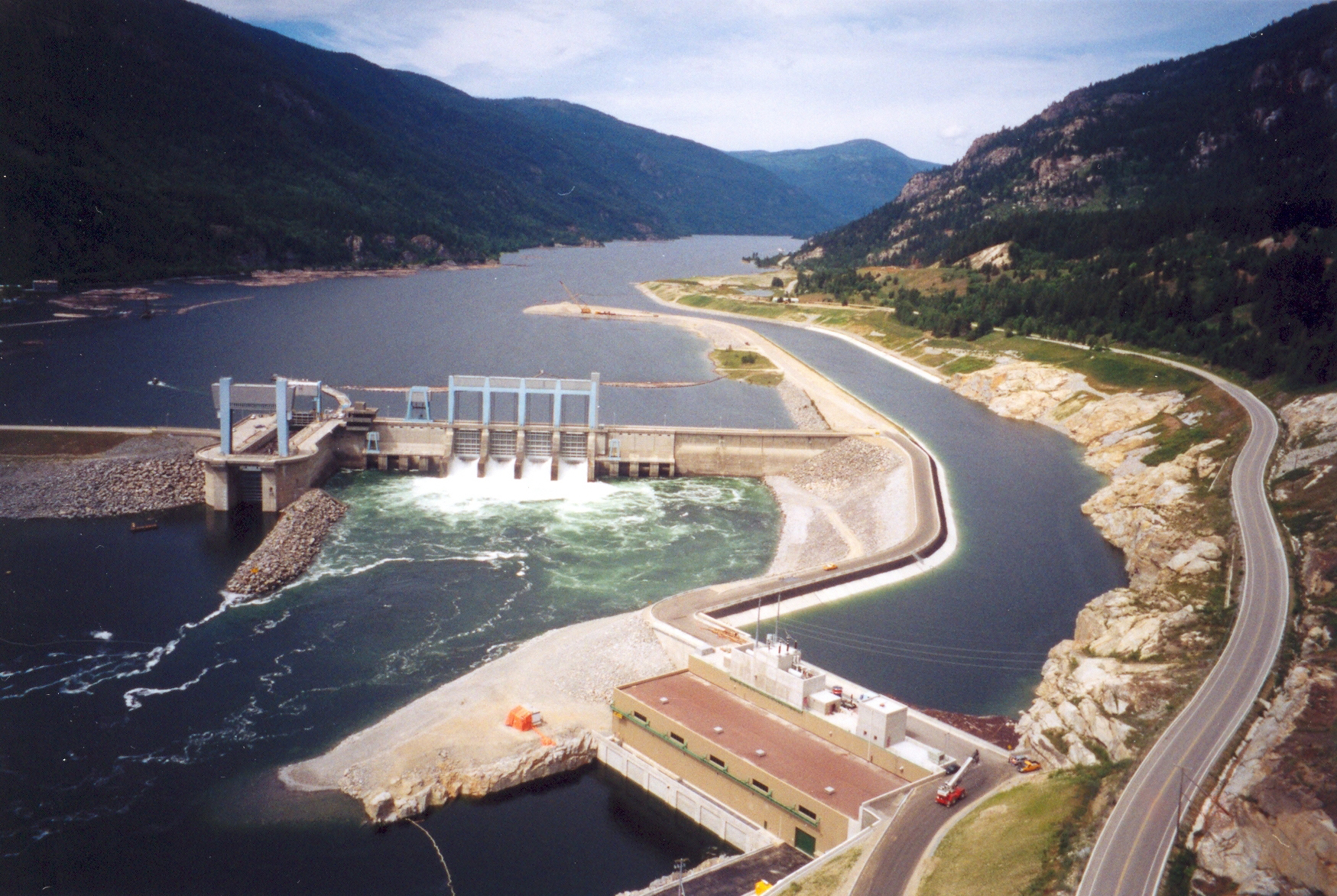
The Hugh Keenleyside Dam (left) was completed in 1968. The Arrow Lakes Generating Station (right) was added in 2002.

In the late 1970s and early 1980s BC Hydro investigated the feasibility of geothermal power production at Meager Creek, north of Pemberton. They concluded from their testing that the underground rock wasn't permeable enough to justify large-scale production of electricity. Around the same time, BC Hydro initiated a project to develop a coal-fired thermal generating station at Hat Creek near Cache Creek, but abandoned the effort in 1981 due to strong environmental opposition.

In 1989 the Power Smart and Resource Smart programs were initiated by BC Hydro to promote energy conservation as an alternative to the cost of creating new generating facilities. Since 2001, BC Hydro has focused on its conservation and energy efficiency programs, re-investing in its existing facilities, and purchasing clean, renewable energy from Independent Power Producers. According to the "British Columbia Energy Plan", released in 2007, BC Hydro must ensure that clean or renewable electricity generation continues to account for at least 90 percent of total generation. As of 2014, 97 percent of BC Hydro's electricity generation comes from clean or renewable sources and this generation only emits 730,000 tonnes of CO_{2} annually from thermal plants.

== Organization and financial performance ==
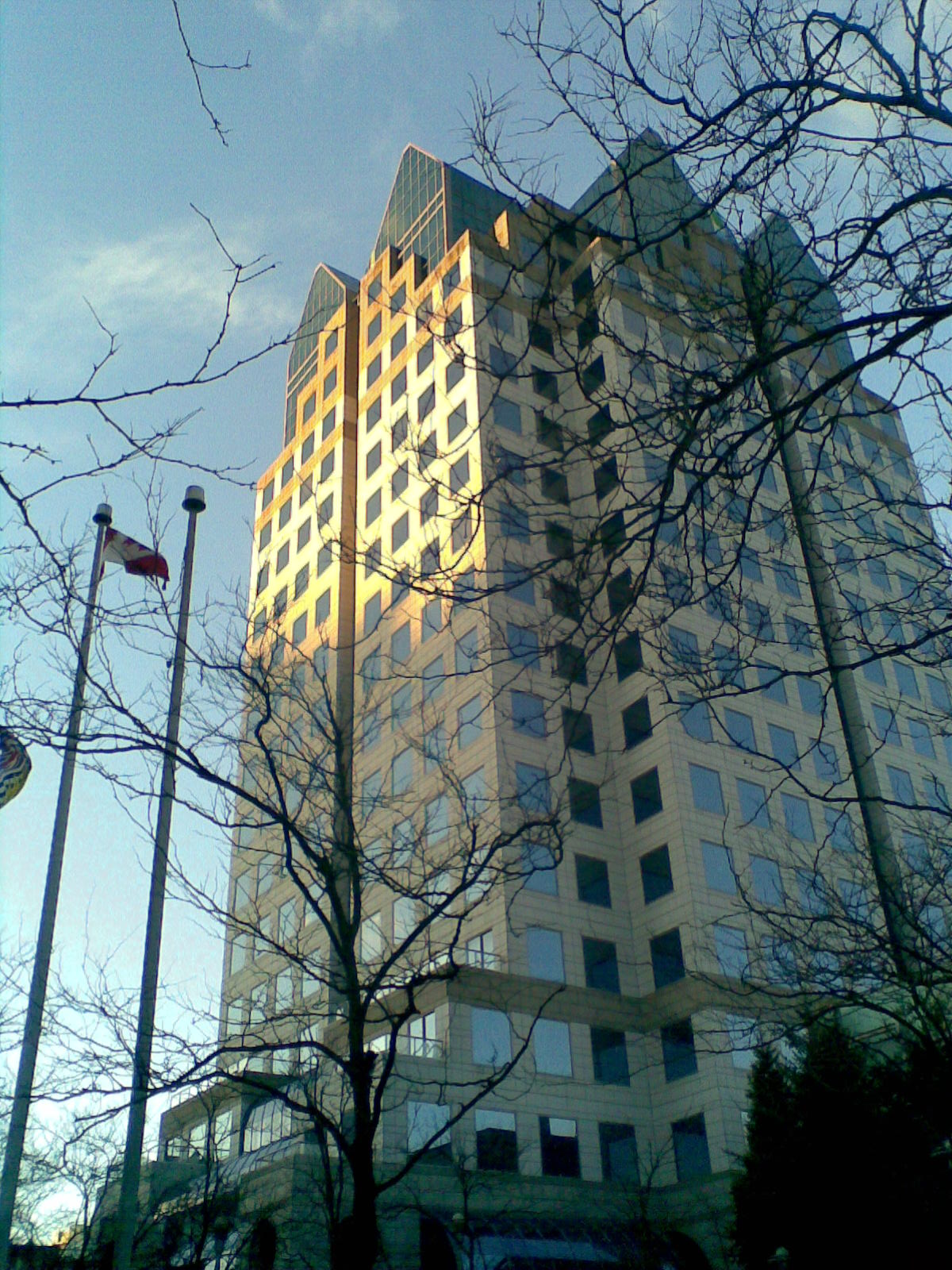
Headquarters in Vancouver.

In 1980 the BC Government established the BC Utilities Commission (BCUC) to regulate public energy utilities and to act as an independent, quasi-judicial regulatory agency regarding energy rates. BC Hydro's operations are overseen by this commission, and governed through an Electric Tariff and an Open Access Transmission Tariff.

=== Site C dam ===
While BC Hydro initially looked at Site C on the Peace River near Fort St. John in the late 1950s, it wasn't until 1982 that it submitted a Site C development project to the British Columbia Utilities Commission (BCUC). It was turned down by the BCUC at that time. Another attempt to revive it in the 1990s was blocked by environmental concerns. In 2004 the BC government's Energy Plan instructed BC Hydro to begin discussions with First Nations, the province of Alberta and communities to discuss Site C as a future option. In May 2014, a federal-provincial Joint Review Panel released a report into the project's environmental, economic, social, heritage, and health effects. A notice of Site C construction commencing in 2015 was issued July 2015.

=== Independent Power Producers ===
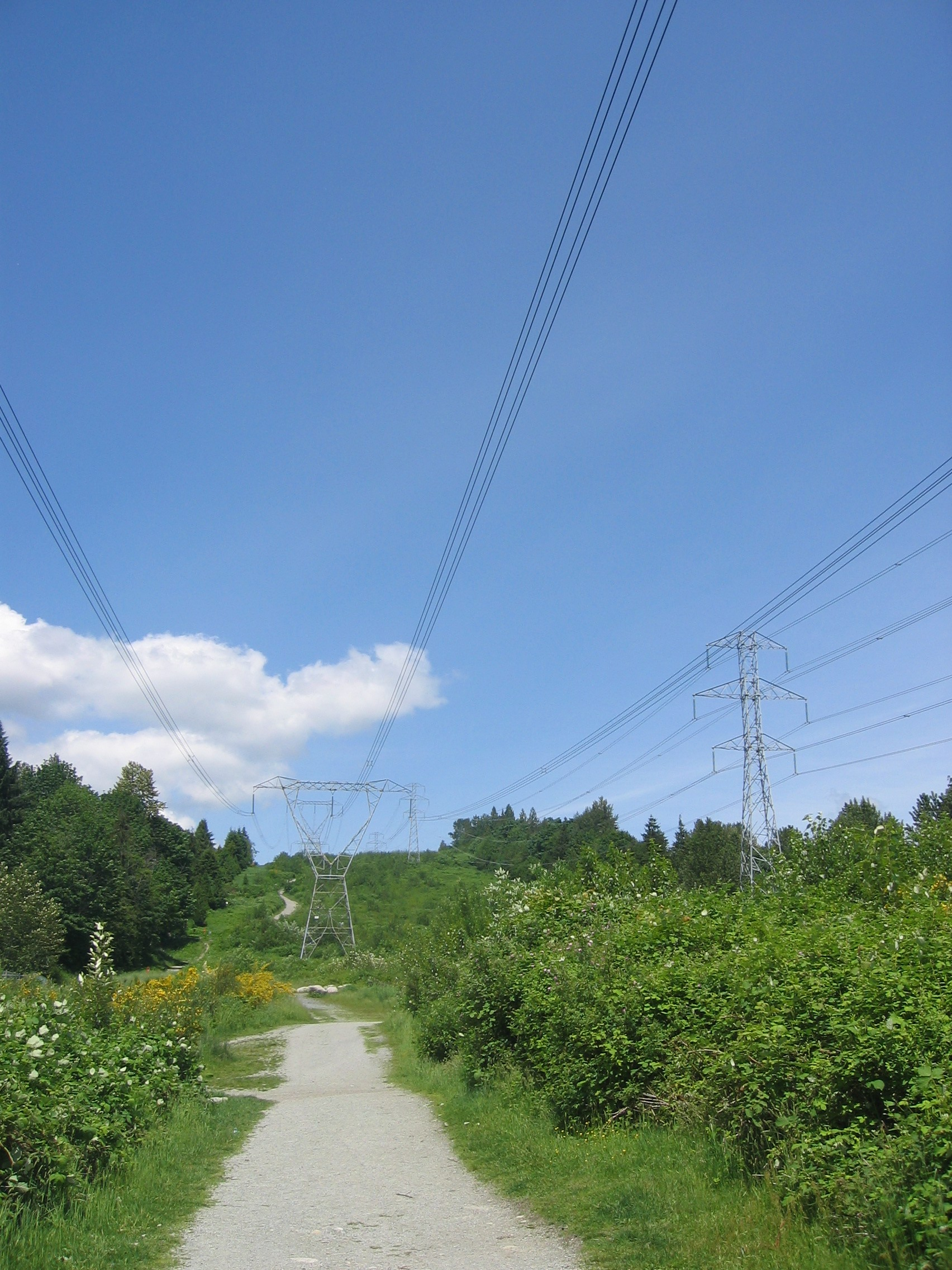
BC Hydro high voltage transmission lines in Coquitlam

The BC Hydro Public Power Legacy and Heritage Contract Act requires BC Hydro to meet the province's future needs for power through private developers. These acts have allowed Independent Power Producers (IPPs) to sell power to BC Hydro, which is required by law to buy it from them even at a loss. In 2011 BC Hydro spent $567.4 million on electricity from IPPs. In 2013, BC Hydro had 127 Electricity Purchase Agreements in its supply portfolio, representing 22,200 gigawatt hours of annual energy and over 5,500 megawatts of capacity. In 2013 those purchases will be $781.8 million in 2013 and $939.8 million in 2014, representing about 20% of domestic supply.

=== Exports and imports ===
Through its interties, BC Hydro exports and imports electric power through its wholly owned power marketing and trading subsidiary, Powerex, which was established in 1988. Powerex also markets the Canadian Entitlement energy from the Columbia River Treaty. BC Hydro belongs to a power sharing consortium which includes electric utilities in Alberta, Washington, Oregon, Idaho and California. The flexibility of the interties contributes to system reliability, for example importing energy in low-water years, or importing when there is a system contingency. In 2013 British Columbia's minister of energy and mines, Bill Bennett spoke to why BC Hydro was agreeing to a $750 million settlement with California over claims Powerex manipulated electricity prices.

=== Financial performance ===
Financial data 2000-2022 (year ending on March 31) millions of Canadian dollars
	2022	2021	2020	2013	2012	2011	2010	2009	2008	2007	2006	2005	2004	2003	2002	2001	2000
Revenues	7,591	6,414	6,269	4,898	4,730	4,061	3,822	4,269	4,210	4,192	4,311	3,725	3,424	3,107	6,311	7,889	3,480
Net earnings	668	688	705	509	558	589	447	365	369	407	266	402	98	418	403	446	416
Plants, property & equipment	42,734	40,383	39,068	17,226	15,991	15,019	14,104	12,099	11,154	10,426	10,023	9,933	9,844	9,793	9,510	9,361	9,320
Net long-term debt	25,642	24,740	19,843	10,846	10,062	8,909	10,696	9,135	7,519	6,916	6,627	6,583	6,853	6,849	6,889	6,214	7,005
Retained earnings	6,994	6,326	5,638	3,369	3,075	2,747	2,621	2,221	1,865	1,783	1,707	1,688	1,634	1,609	1,529	1,459	1,385
Debt/Equity ratio	78:22	80:20	81:19	80:20	80:20	80:20	80:20	81:19	70:30	70:30	70:30	68:32	70:30	72:28	72:28	70:30	74:26

== Renewable energy and conservation initiatives ==
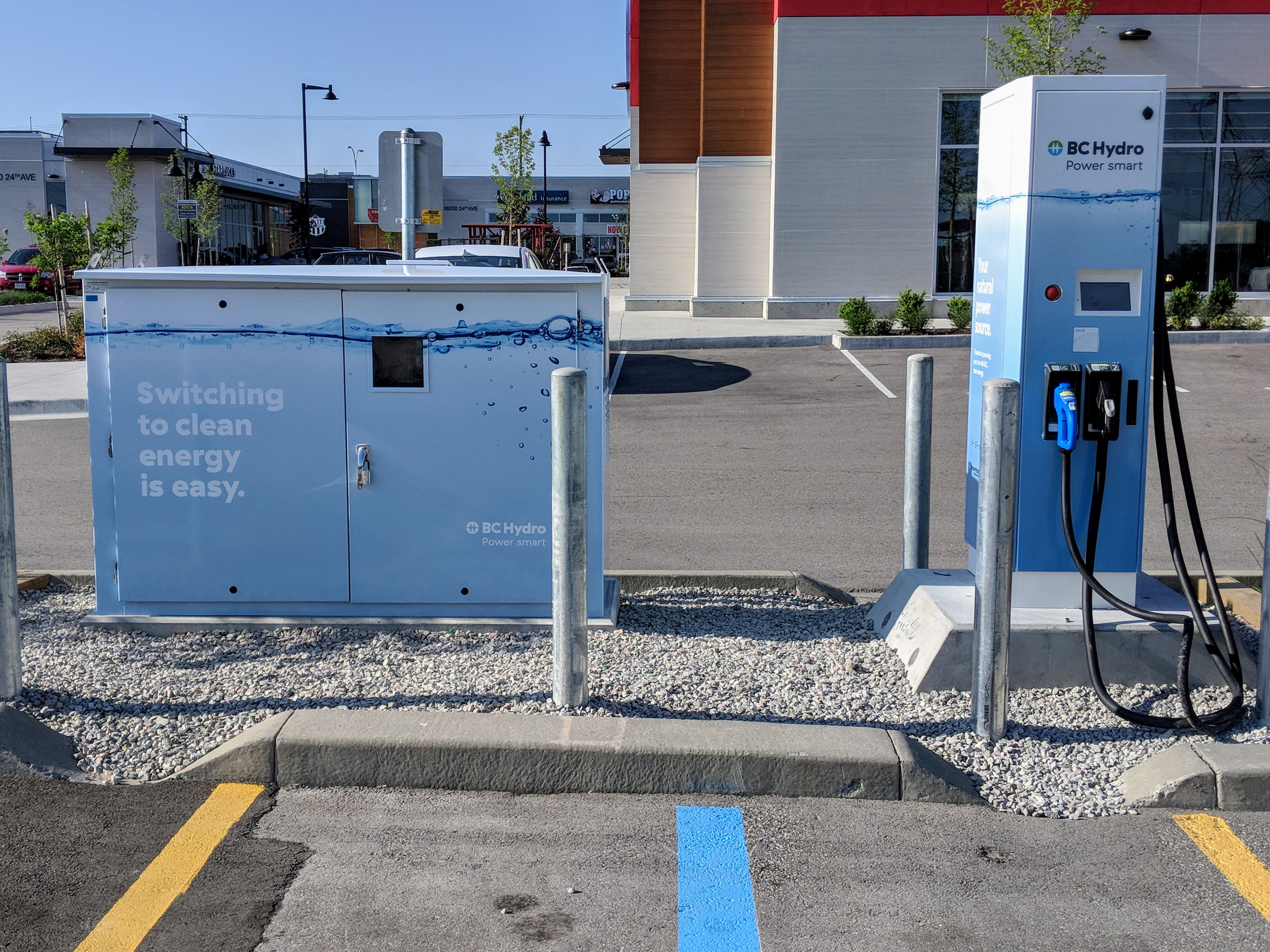
BC Hydro charging station in Grandview Heights, Surrey

BC Hydro's Power Smart program encourages energy conservation among its residential, commercial, and industrial customers. The program also aims to promote energy saving retail products and building construction, and includes a "Sustainable Communities Program". Its in-house Resource Smart program is used to identify and implement efficiency gains at existing BC Hydro facilities. BC Hydro also practices energy conservation at its generating facilities through the continuous monitoring and efficient use of the water resources used to power its generators.

BC Hydro was committed by the BC government's Energy Plan to achieve electric power self-sufficiency in the province by 2016, with all new generation plants having zero net greenhouse gas emissions by the same year. In 2013, BC Hydro released an Integrated Resource Plan which includes meeting at least 66 percent of the expected increase in electricity demand through increased energy efficiency.

BC Hydro has also entered into energy purchase contracts with a new category of company created by special legislation, Independent Power Producers (IPPs) to buy electricity generated from intermittent renewable sources, mainly from small capacity run of river hydro and more recently, wind power, wood residue energy, and energy from organic municipal waste. There has been some criticism of this policy on the basis that it will result in Hydro paying significantly higher rates to private producers than it would have if the power were self-generated.

BC has a policy not to develop nuclear power.

As of July 2018, BC Hydro operated 58 electric vehicle charging stations in the province. The corporation anticipates having 800 EV chargers in place by spring of 2026.

In 2024, BC Hydro initiated agreements for nine wind farm projects, expected to collectively generate nearly 5,000 gigawatt hours annually, increasing the grid's capacity by 8% by 2031. This C$6 billion investment in wind energy underscores BC Hydro's efforts to meet growing electricity demand with sustainable solutions.

== Cost of electricity ==
In November 2013 the BC Minister of Energy and Mines announced a 10-year plan that will keep electricity rates as low as possible. Increases during the first five years will be between 9 and 3 percent annually. BC Hydro's profitability is affected by its large debt, estimated to reach five billion dollars by 2017.

== Smart Meters ==
BC Hydro's Smart Metering Program in 2011 introduced the installation of Itron C2S0D Smart meters as mandatory. In 2013 BC Hydro offered the Meter Choices Program for $20 to $30 monthly.

== See also ==
- 2015 British Columbia blackout
- Alberta Electricity Policy
- Columbia Power Corporation
- Energy in Canada
- FortisBC
- HVDC Vancouver Island
- List of power stations in British Columbia
- List of power stations in Canada
- Western North America Interconnection
