= BC Transmission Corporation =

British Columbia Transmission Corporation
- Trade name: BCTC
- Type: Crown Corporation
- Industry: Electric utility
- Predecessor: BC Hydro
- Founded: 2003
- Defunct: 2010
- Successor: BC Hydro
- Area served: British Columbia
- Products: Electricity transmission
- Owner: Government of British Columbia

The British Columbia Transmission Corporation (BCTC) was a Crown corporation in the province of British Columbia, Canada that existed from 2003 to 2010. BCTC's mandate was to plan, build, operate and maintain B.C.'s electrical transmission network.

== History and Background ==
The British Columbia Transmission Corporation (BCTC) was a provincial Crown corporation headquartered in downtown Vancouver.

=== Formation ===
BCTC was conceived under the BC Liberal Party's 2002 Energy Plan, with a mandate to separate the province's power transmission from its generation and distribution. BCTC was formed through the BC Transmission Corporation Act in 2003 to create an independent power transmission operation, to facilitate a market regulation of the transmission network, to enable private generation, and for wholesale power marketing operations to operate independently from BC Hydro. BCTC's operation and staff were separated from BC Hydro, and the BCTC was established as a new regulated utility under the oversight of the BC Utilities Commission (BCUC).

When BCTC was formed, the North American electricity industry was hoping to attain increased independence of transmission, and the development of regional transmission organizations. BCTC was created to help foster and encourage new sources of power generation across the province of BC from Independent Power Producers (IPPs), and allow independent use of BC's transmission system.

BCTC's role was to plan, operate, and maintain the transmission system, while BC Hydro remained the owner of the physical transmission infrastructure and rights of way. The Generation and Distribution of the BC electrical system remained under the ownership of BC Hydro.

=== Officers ===
Michael Costello was the first BCTC CEO from 2003 to 2005.

Jane Peverett was BCTC's president and CEO from 2005 to 2009.

Janet Woodruff was BCTC's interim CEO from 2009 to 2010.

== Key Events ==
=== Adoption of an Open Access Transmission Tariff ===
In 2004, BCTC adopted an Open Access Transmission Tariff following the Pro forma tariff used in the United States as established by the Federal Energy Regulatory Commission (FERC). Under this tariff, BC Hydro became a transmission customer of BCTC, and other third party generators and entities connecting to the network also became customers under the tariff.

=== 2007 Energy Plan and 2008 Clean Power Call ===
In February 2007, the B.C. government issued a new Energy Plan. This plan included several policies relating to transmission to ensure adequate transmission be in place to support the province's goal of energy self-sufficiency. BCTC then supported BC Hydro in 2008 in the issuing of a Clean Power Call for attracting additional IPP generation resources.

=== Mandatory Reliability Program ===
In response to the Northeast blackout of 2003, utilities in North America worked towards enacting regulation of utilities to prevent future blackouts. British Columbia made this regulatory change in 2009 through a change to the Utilities Commission Act, which resulted in the BCUC enacting the mandatory reliability program, and BCTC filing its initial adoption of Mandatory Reliability Standards.

=== 2010 BC Clean Energy Act and Reincorporation into BC Hydro ===
In 2010 the BC Clean Energy Act set out specific provisions for British Columbia to become a leading supplier of clean, renewable energy, and to meet future electricity needs while generating new jobs and reducing greenhouse gas emissions.

Under the act, all of BCTC's assets, employees, and responsibilities were reincorporated back into BC Hydro, reversing the separation. Seven years after the separation from BC Hydro, BCTC was integrated back into BC Hydro on 5 July 2010. The total cost to the BC taxpayers for the creation and subsequent reintegration of BCTC was estimated to be $65 million CAD, attracting significant political scrutiny. Unifying the companies returned BC Hydro to providing a single point of planning and authority for the provincial energy system.

BC's 2010 Clean Energy Act did not repeal the Open Access Transmission Tariff, and so corporate Standards of Conduct were adopted within BC Hydro to ensure that the "transmission provider" functions internal to the company would remain independent of the "transmission customer" and "market function" employees, and BC Hydro continues to fulfill the requirements of the OATT post-separation. The transmission network continues to be publicly owned, with the Government of BC remaining as the sole shareholder of the transmission network.

== Operations ==
BCTC managed and operated all of BC Hydro's transmission network, including over 300 substations and 18,000 km of transmission lines throughout British Columbia, at voltages from 69 kV to 500 kV.

BCTC had over 350 employees, most of which were located at its headquarters in the Bentall Centre in Downtown Vancouver. BCTC also owned the network control centres used to operate the BC Transmission system, and had a small number of employees posted in field offices at other locations in BC. Its total assets were valued at over $2.5 billion CAD.

BC Hydro retained ownership of and management of their generating facilities in British Columbia. Points of interconnection were established between BC Hydro and BCTC, and BC Hydro became a network transmission customer through the Open Access Transmission Tariff.

While the power system assets were still owned by BC Hydro, the corporate function was that of silent owner. BCTC was set up with the management authority for the system, including control of all investment management and maintenance planning, while BC Hydro divisions continued to supply engineering services, field operations resources, and other functions through service agreements.

== Projects ==
BCTC initiated several major projects and initiatives during its existence:

=== Vancouver Island Transmission Reinforcement ===
The Vancouver Island Transmission Reinforcement project involved the replacement of aging 138kV AC submarine cables across the Strait of Georgia and Trincomali Channel with new 230 kV AC cables, as well as the replacement of the overhead sections of the route between Arnott Substation in Delta and Vancouver Island Terminal near Duncan, and the associated voltage conversions. The project is notable due to the extensive public opposition to BC Hydro using its existing Rights of Way in Delta and on Saltspring Island. Opposition was so intense that Government of BC instructed BCTC and BC Hydro to offer to purchase the properties of the opposing landowners in Delta. After the project BC Hydro then sold the properties to new owners (once the new lines had been installed).

=== Control Center Replacement ===
BC Hydro's legacy control centres (one system control center on Burnaby Mountain, and four regional control centres at locations around the province) were constructed in the 1960s and were aging, and BCTC's project replaced all five with two new, fully-redundant, seismically reinforced, and modernized control centres. The former system control center building on Burnaby Mountain is now part of the Simon Fraser University campus, and as of 2019 was being used to house the university's supercomputer. The building is in a modern architectural style, and has also been used as a set in various films, including the Halo 4: Forward Unto Dawn series.

=== 2008 Clean Power Call ===
Under the Open Access Tariff, BC Hydro and BCTC jointly ran a competitive call for clean, renewable power. BCTC performed the system studies required for the proposed private generators, and under the call multiple independent power producers were successfully integrated onto the BC network.

=== Interior-to-Lower Mainland Project ===
This project constructed a new, fifth 500 kV transmission circuit from the interior of the province to the load center on the coast, increasing the transfer capability of the system. The project was the first new 500 kV circuit added in British Columbia in two decades, and was notable for crossing over 250 km of extremely challenging terrain through the Coast Mountains of BC.

=== Northwest Transmission Line Project ===
This project constructed a new 287 kV circuit from Terrace north to Bob Quinn, generally following the Stewart-Cassiar Highway, and the line route originally surveyed for a future 500 kV line for the never-realized plan by BC Hydro in the 1970s to dam the Grand Canyon of the Stikine River. The new 287 kV line allowed integration of new mining loads, private run-of-river power generators such as those on the Iskut River at Forest Kerr.

== Awards ==
BCTC and Hydro-Québec's LineScout partnership earned the Edison Electric Institute's Edison Award in 2010, for demonstrating the LineScout robotics technology for use in the inspection of long transmission water crossings. LineScout is a series of robotic devices developed by the Hydro-Québec Research Institute, IREQ. LineScout is designed to inspect high-voltage transmission lines, and the remote-controlled robot uses cameras and other sensors to inspect the condition of the line, discover defects in the equipment and conductors, while also employing a smart navigation system to pinpoint defect locations and maneuver around obstacles such as splices, hardware components, and aviation warning markers.

== See also ==
- BC Hydro
- Powerex Corp a wholly owned subsidiary of BC Hydro
- List of electrical generating stations in British Columbia
