= BCTC =

BCTC may refer to:

- BC Transmission Corporation, a publicly owned Crown corporation that existed from 2003 to 2010, whose mandate was to manage the electrical transmission system in British Columbia, Canada
- BC Treaty Commission, an independent body responsible for facilitating treaty negotiations among First Nations in BC and the governments of Canada and BC
- Bluegrass Community and Technical College, a community college in Lexington, Kentucky, USA
- Brooklyn Center Transit Center, a rapid bus station in Brooklyn Center, Minnesota, USA
- BCTC (drug), an inhibitor of TRPV1
