= AltaLink =

Canadian electricity transmission company

AltaLink, L.P.
- Company type: Subsidiary
- Industry: Utilities
- Founded: 2002; 24 years ago
- Headquarters: Calgary, Alberta, Canada
- Area served: Alberta, Canada
- Key people: Paul Lee, President
- Revenue: ▲$904 million CAD (2024) (AltaLink Financials 25)
- Net income: ▲$340 million CAD (2024) (AltaLink Financials 25)
- Number of employees: 700
- Parent: Berkshire Hathaway Energy
- Website: www.altalink.ca

AltaLink, L.P. is one of Canada's largest electricity transmission companies. With more than 13,300 kilometres of transmission line and 311 substations, AltaLink is Alberta’s largest regulated electricity transmission provider. AltaLink is owned by Berkshire Hathaway Energy.

== Overview ==
AltaLink, L.P. is an Alberta-based utility company that provides electricity transmission services to most of Alberta. On April 30, 2002, AltaLink assumed control of Alberta's largest transmission system previously owned by TransAlta. It owns and operates approximately 13,300 km of transmission lines and approximately 311 substations, which makes up for the bulk of Alberta's high-voltage electricity transmission infrastructure. AltaLink also owns and operates the Alberta portion of the interconnection that allows electricity to be exchanged between Alberta and British Columbia.

AltaLink has more than 600 employees. Headquartered in Calgary, Alberta, the company also has offices in Lethbridge, Red Deer, and Edmonton.

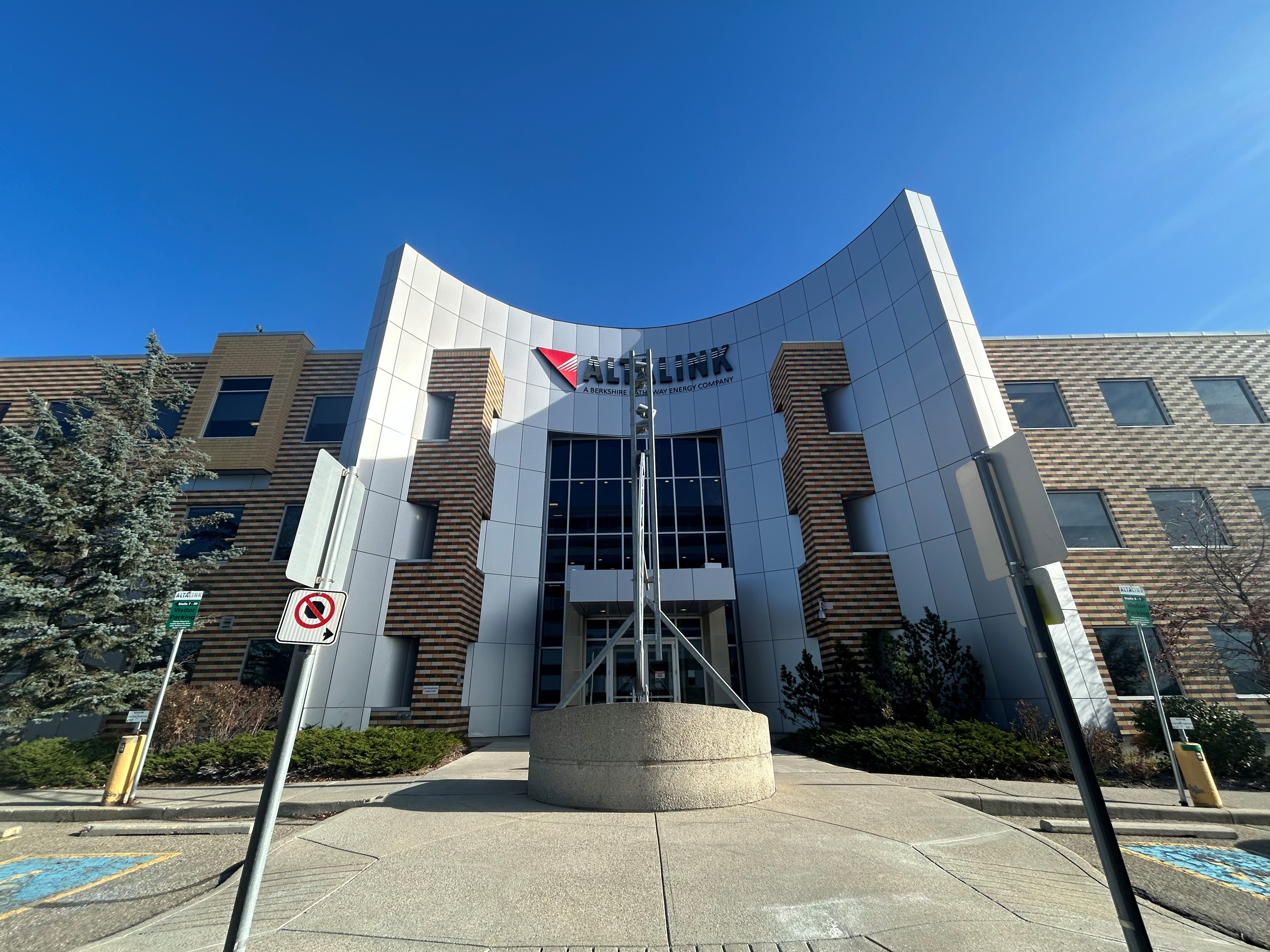
AltaLink head office Calgary CA 2024

On May 1, 2014, AltaLink announced that Berkshire Hathaway Energy had agreed to purchase the company from SNC-Lavalin. The sale was completed December 1, 2014 following approval by the Alberta Utilities Commission.

== Transmission in Alberta ==
Alberta's electricity market is separated into generation, transmission, and distribution. While the cost of electricity generation is dependent upon market forces, the cost of electricity transmission and distribution in Alberta is regulated by the provincial government.

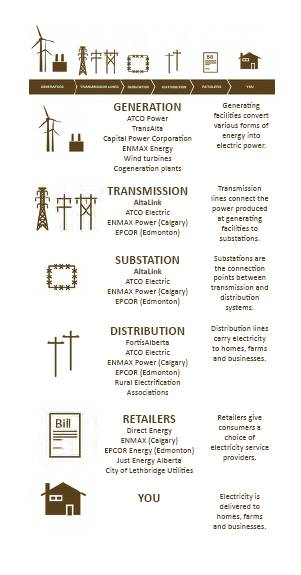
This is a breakdown of the electricity market in Alberta.

The planning and operation of Alberta's electric system is done by the Alberta Electric System Operator (AESO), a non-profit entity independent of any industry affiliations and owns no transmission or market assets. The AESO determines the need for the province, and then directs Transmission Facilities Owners (TFOs) to build the project. Transmission Facilities Owners (TFOs) are regulated by the Alberta Utilities Commission (AUC) and include companies like AltaLink, ATCO Electric, ENMAX POWER in Calgary, and EPCOR in Edmonton. All TFOs must follow AUC regulations in engaging stakeholders, and the projects have to be approved by the AUC.

== Current projects ==
AltaLink undertakes various transmission infrastructure projects across Alberta to maintain and expand the provincial power grid. These projects typically involve upgrading aging infrastructure, constructing new transmission lines, and improving system reliability. Details about specific active projects are available through AltaLink’s public communications and regulatory filings.

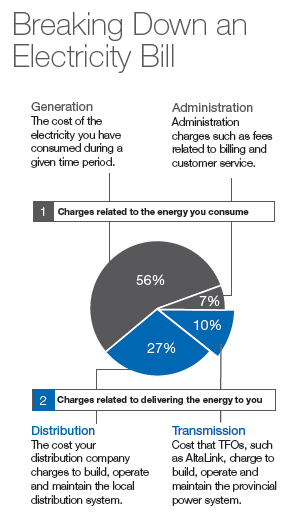
This is a percentage breakdown of a typical residential electricity bill in Alberta.

== Corporate governance ==
AltaLink is governed by a board of directors. The current directors of the board include David Tuer (Chair), David R. Collyer, William J. Fehrman, Calvin D. Haack, Natalie Hocken, Susan Riddell Rose, Scott Thon, Brad Wall, Douglas Mitchell, Q.C., and Patricia Nelson.

== Community Involvement ==
AltaLink has engaged in various community and safety initiatives in Alberta. According to its 2011 Report to Communities, the company projected over 37,000 person-years of employment related to construction and support services between 2010 and 2015 through its transmission projects.

Since 2005, AltaLink has been a sponsor of Alberta 4-H, serving as a Legacy Builder sponsor and supporting communication and public speaking programs across the province. The company also hosts an annual Farm Safety Day in Calgary to promote safety in the agricultural sector.

AltaLink is a member of the Joint Utility Safety Team (JUST), which aims to reduce power-line incidents by promoting safety awareness. In 2011, AltaLink co-hosted Canada’s first Avian Interactions with Power Lines Workshop in Banff, in partnership with the Avian Power Line Interaction Committee, focusing on mitigating risks to birds near electrical infrastructure.

In recent years, AltaLink has supported several charitable and educational initiatives. These include contributions to STARS air ambulance’s fleet renewal campaign, a long-term employee giving program in support of United Way and other local charities, and an Indigenous scholarship program that provides annual awards to students from Alberta's First Nations and Métis communities. The company has also supported initiatives aimed at advancing gender equity in the electricity sector.

== See also ==
- Electricity sector in Alberta
- Electricity policy of Alberta
- Electric power transmission
- Electricity market
