= Burrard Generating Station =

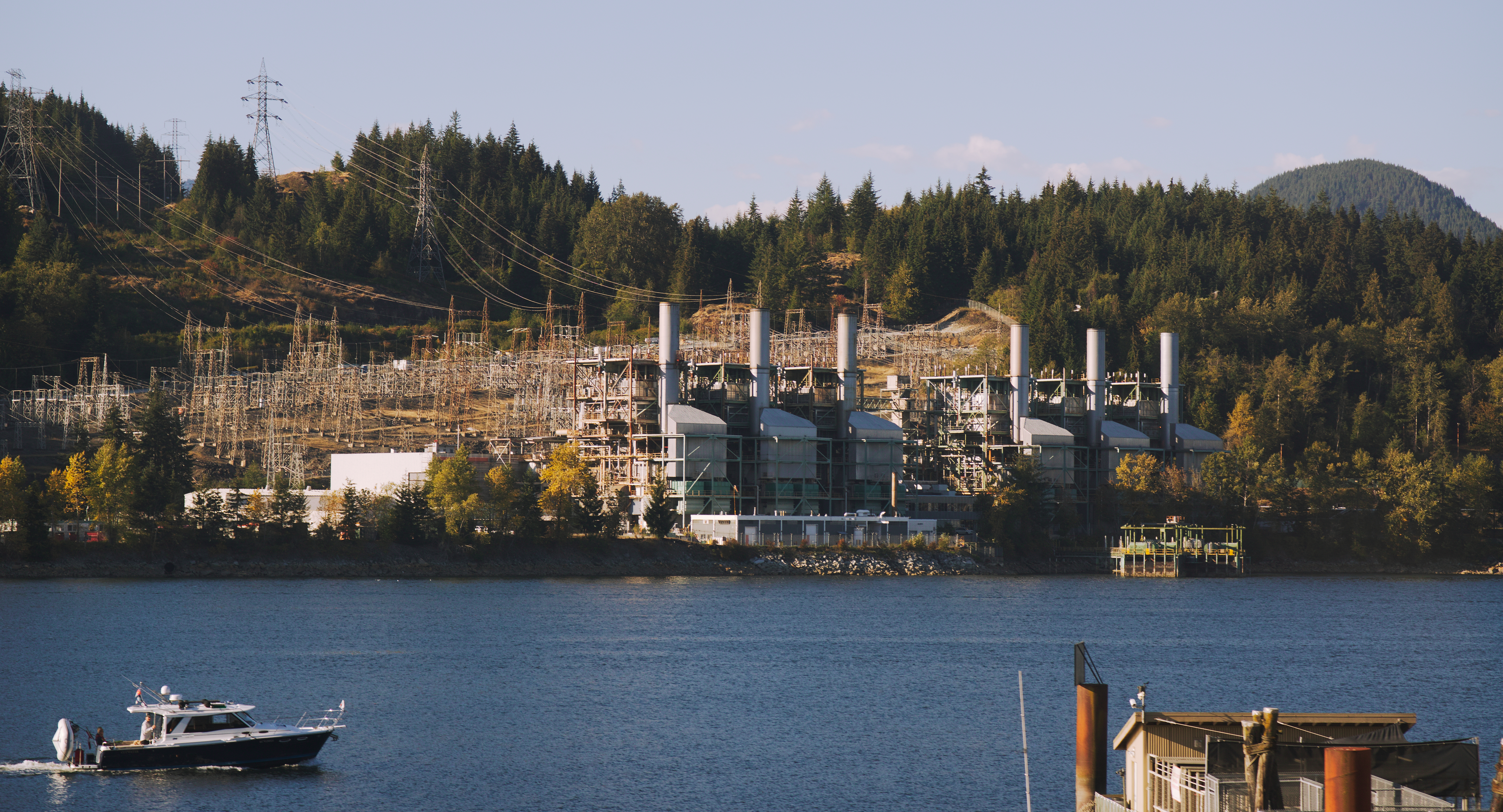
- View from the south
- Country: Canada
- Location: Port Moody, British Columbia
- Coordinates: 49°17′56″N 122°53′25″W
- Status: Decommissioned
- Commission date: 1962
- Decommission date: 2016
- Owner: BC Hydro

Thermal power station
- Primary fuel: Natural gas
- Turbine technology: Steam turbine

Power generation
- Units decommissioned: 6 × 160 MW
- Nameplate capacity: 950 megawatts

Burrard Generating Station was a natural gas-fired station built by BC Electric, owned by BC Hydro since 1961, located in Port Moody, British Columbia, Canada.

== Description ==
The station originally consisted of six 160 MW units; it served to meet short term peak demands. Three units were held in standby, available on eight hours' notice. The three active units were used for voltage regulation. A plant upgrade project was completed in 2003. In 2001 it represented over 9% of BC Hydro's gross metered generation.

BC Hydro shut down the station in 2016 after the completion of enough replacement capacity at the Mica Generating Station.

After the gas turbines were decommissioned, four of the six generator units had their drive shafts cut and were converted to synchronous condenser operation, providing reactive power to the transmission system.

== See also ==
- BC Hydro
