= Alberta Electric System Operator =

Electricity transmission system operator in Alberta, Canada

- Type: Non-profit
- Industry: Electricity
- Headquarters: Calgary, Alberta, Canada
- Key people: Michael Law – President and CEO
- Services: Planning and operation of the Alberta Interconnected Electric System (AIES)
- Website: www.aeso.ca

The Alberta Electric System Operator (AESO) is the non-profit organization responsible for operating Alberta, Canada's power grid. AESO oversees the planning and operation of the Alberta Interconnected Electric System (AIES) in a "safe, reliable, and economical" manner. It is mandated by provincial legislation to act in the public interest and cannot own any transmission, distribution or generation assets.

One of AESO's responsibilities is to manage system load in the case where shortfalls in supply or excessive demand for electricity threaten the integrity of the power grid. In this case AESO can direct power companies to shed load temporarily through measures such as rolling blackouts. In July 2012, six power generators were shut down during a major heat wave that resulted in high demand on the power grid, Edmonton, Calgary, Red Deer and Lethbridge were hit by rolling blackouts. AESO directed utilities to reduce their customer load. AESO's Doug Simpson explained that this had not happened since 2006.

According to their homepage, AESO operates "independently of any industry affiliations and owns no transmission or market assets."

== Duties and responsibilities ==
The key duties and responsibilities of the AESO are dictated by the Province of Alberta's Electric Utilities Act (EUA) and the Transmission Regulation (T-Reg) and include, without limitation, the following:

- Determine the future requirements of the AIES, develop transmission plans over near-term, medium-term and long-term planning horizons that identify transmission system enhancements needed to meet those requirements, and make arrangements to implement those enhancements as necessary.
- Prepare and maintain a transmission system that anticipates, for at least 20 years forward, system conditions and requirements. The system must be planned to accommodate future growth, which requires the AESO to take a long-term view while adjusting for short-term changes and focusing on system requirements that meet the long-term vision for electrical infrastructure.
- Ensure the safe, reliable and economic operation of the AIES.
- Operate the power pool and facilitate the electricity market in a manner that is fair, efficient and openly competitive.
- Provide transmission access service consistent with an approved transmission tariff.
- Manage and recover the costs associated with line losses and ancillary services.
- Conduct a fair and open competitive process to determine the successful proponent who will develop, design, build, finance, own, operate, and maintain identified major transmission infrastructure in Alberta.

The AESO operates a market for the exchange of electric energy in Alberta and attempts to uphold the principles of market fairness, openness, and efficiency. To this end the AESO "contracts with transmission facility owners to provide generators access to the electric grid."

== History ==
Alberta electricity policy changed in 1996, with the province restructuring its electricity market away from traditional regulation to a market-based system. The market now includes a host of buyers and sellers, and an increasingly diverse infrastructure.

By 2020, Alberta had 900 wind turbines, which represented approximately 40% of Canada's total at that time. In 2006, wind power provided less than 8% of Alberta's total power generation. AESO had said wind power was not reliable enough because wind doesn't blow consistently. When it drops off, coal and natural gas plants have to take up the slack to avoid power shortages." At that time, Alberta didn't have "enough transmission lines to connect new wind turbines to its power grid."

By 2021, most of the power generators in Alberta used natural gas as the province transitioned away from coal.

AESO announced an all-time record peak electricity demand of 12,187 megawatts was reached on 19 December 2022 during an extended spell of extreme cold. A grid alert was announced when Keephills 3 power plant west of Edmonton experienced an unplanned outage. In Calgary overnight wind chills of −10 combined with −25 °C temperature. On 3 January 2022, AESO reported a record high electricity demand of 11,939 megawatts during an extreme cold spell.

In 2016, under then-Premier Notley, the provincial government had set a target of transitioning away from power generation dependent on fossil fuels by using renewables. The goal was to replace 30% of all electricity generation in the province with renewables by 2030.

By December 2022, Alberta had made progress towards reaching the 30% by 2030 target ahead of schedule. According to AESO, in 2017, 59% of Alberta's electricity generators were still using coal; renewables only accounted for 10%. By late 2022, the 18% of the province's electricity came from renewables, many coal-powered plants had converted to natural gas, and it was anticipated that coal generation would be completely phased out by 2023.

== Leadership and governance ==
According to their homepage, AESO operates "independently of any industry affiliations and owns no transmission or market assets." As of November 2023, the AESO executive and board of directors was composed of:

AESO executive
Name	Position	Background	Compensation (2022, in CAD$)
Michael Law	President/CEO	Project manager at VECO Corporation, associate at Enron, consultant at Duke Energy, VP at Direct Energy Marketing Ltd.	$1,149,555.01 (exceeding contractual compensation limit of $616,000, in Article 5.2)
Bill Baker	VP Information Technology	Worked at Canadian Pacific Railway, Department of National Defence, Canadian Net Income Stabilization Account, We Care Health Services	$443,672.98
Robert Davidson	VP Grid Reliability Projects/Planning	Engineer at Mid-continent Area Power Pool (MAPP), engineer at Dairyland Power Cooperative, manager at Enmax, and manager at Primary Engineering and Construction	$392,709.01
Kevin Dawson	VP Strategic Integration	Director of Hedging and Market Analysis at TransAlta	$353,790.13
Nicole Kinch	VP Finance	Business assurance manager of energy/utilities at Moss Adams, senior manager at Rothstein Kass, senior analyst at Suncor Energy, corporate controller at Mustus Energy, and CFO at Wagepoint	$419,673.58
Nicole LeBlanc	VP Markets	Economist at Canadian Energy Research Institute (CERI)	$334,397.95
Brian McGurk	VP People, Culture, Customer Experience	VP HR at Global Thermoelectric (bought by Quantum Fuel Systems in 2003), VP HR at CCS Income Trust, VP at Smart Technologies, EVP at Secure Energy Services, president of people culture & strategy, and board chair at Castle Mountain Resort	$333,023.62
Marie-France Samaroden	VP Grid Reliability Operations	EIT of Leadership Development Program at TransAlta, Campaign Representative at United Way Calgary/Area, and Director of Corporate Operations at AltaLink	$371,477.26
Cameron Bush	Chief Engineer	Worked with Ontario Hydro, City of Calgary Electric System, TransAlta, and AltaLink	$299,782.53

AESO Board of Directors
Name	Position	Background	Compensation (2022, in CAD$)
Karl Johannson	Chair	President/EVP of Canada and Mexico Gas Pipelines at TC Energy, director at Canadian Energy Pipeline Association (CEPA), director at Canadian Gas Association (CGA), director at Canadian Electric Association (CEA), board member at ClearStream Energy Services, board member at Columbia Pipeline Partners LP, and board chair at TC PipeLines	$91,235.20
Stephen Clark	Member	Process Engineer at Novacor Chemicals, Project Engineer at Fluor Corporation, Business Development at Stone & Webster, SVP of Canadian and NE US Gas Pipelines at TC Energy, co-author of 2008 'Calgary 10-Year Plan to End Homelessness', and Board Chair of Canadian Mental Health Association	n/a
Aaron Engen	Member	Vice-Chair of Investment/Corporate Banking at BMO Capital Markets, Partner at McCarthy Tétrault, and Board of Governors Member at University of Lethbridge	$54,592.39
Alex Federucci	Member	VP of corporate transformation at Talisman Energy, VP of people at TC PipeLines, VP of business process integration at TC Energy, and board member at Wellspring Alberta	n/a
Georgette Habib	Member	Manager at Alberta Energy and Utilities Board, board member at National Energy Board, board of governors member at University of Calgary, president at GE Energy Consulting Ltd., and board member at Alberta Energy Regulator	$45,408.64
Patricia Kaiser	Member	Marketing Director at ARMATA Technologies, VP at MONTAGE IT Services, VP of Marketing at Allstream Inc., VP at Enabil Solutions, COO/SVP at Sierra Energy, Interim President/COO at MacKay CEO Forums, VP at BOWEN Group, and President of Light Industrial at Agilus Work Solutions	$46,429.05
Mike Maxwell	Member	Systems/programmer analyst at Saint John Shipbuilding, manager at Bear Creek Corporation, manager at L.L.Bean, manager of IT at Amirix Systems, director of technical services at Maritime Broadcasting System, director of IT at Halifax International Airport Authority, CIO at Metropolitan Airports Commission, VP/CIO at Calgary Airport Authority, Technology and Innovation at Shannex Incorporated, and aviation leader at OARO Blockchain	$53,061.76
Ann-Marie Osinski	Member	Partner at PwC Canada, senior financial consultant at Canadian Premium Sand Inc. (CPS), CFO at Questor Technology, and committee member at Alberta Securities Commission	$54,082.17

== High cost of electricity in Alberta ==
According to a 2013 Edmonton Journal article, Keith Provost, former senior vice-president of Alberta Power Ltd. (now ATCO Electric), with decades of experience in the electrical utilities business, said that instead of marketing electricity contracts for future deliveries in a regulated market, AESO has their own system that is open to manipulation and is not a free-market system. According to AESO, "The pool price is the arithmetic average of the 60 one-minute system marginal prices. Only those offers accepted generate power and receive the AESO pool price. All offers accepted receive the same price, the pool price, not the price offered."

In April 2013, Calgary ranked third (with an average monthly payment of $216 based on a monthly consumption of 1,000 kWh) and Edmonton fourth ($202 a month) in Canada compared to other cities in terms of high electricity bills. Halifax placed first and worst in Canada at $225 a month. Compared to other cities in North America, Calgary and Edmonton placed seventh and eighth in terms of highest power costs.

The unit price of electricity in Calgary in April 2013 was 14.81 cents per kWh, compared to 6.87 cents per kWh in Montreal, 15.45 in Halifax.

On 1 November 2019, during the premiership of Jason Kenney, the United Conservative Party (UCP) removed the electricity price cap of the regulated rate option (RRO) at 6.8 cents/kW—which had been in place since then-Premier, Rachel Notley's New Democratic Party had set the price cap in 2016.

In Alberta, the residential monthly utilities bill includes the cost of electricity, natural gas, water, delivery fees, and transmission fees, with energy costs representing approximately a third of the total.

According to a 24 February 2022 Canadian Press article, the electricity portfolio of the Calgary-headquartered TransAlta—a utility company—generated a gross margin of $864 million in the three months that ended 31 December 2021, which was $405 million more than its earnings during the same time frame in the previous year.

The price of electricity had increased in 2022, after spiking early in the year. By November 2022, Direct Energy's residential monthly regulated rate option (RRO) increased to 17.597 cents/kWh from 10.483 cents in November 2021, while the Enmax RRO increased 10.66 to 18.245 cents from the same time period. Prices reach record highs in December with predictions of even higher prices in early 2023.

On 2 November, 2023, TransAlta purchased Heartland Generation - the third-largest electricity generation corporation in Alberta - for $658 million. Resultingly, TransAlta now controls 46% of electricity generation in the province, which critics have pointed out gives the company increased incentive and ability to use economic withholding and other monopoly powers to artificially increase electricity prices.

== See also ==
- Electricity policy of Alberta
- Electric power transmission
- Independent System Operator
- Electricity market
- Coal in Canada
