= Powerex (electricity) =

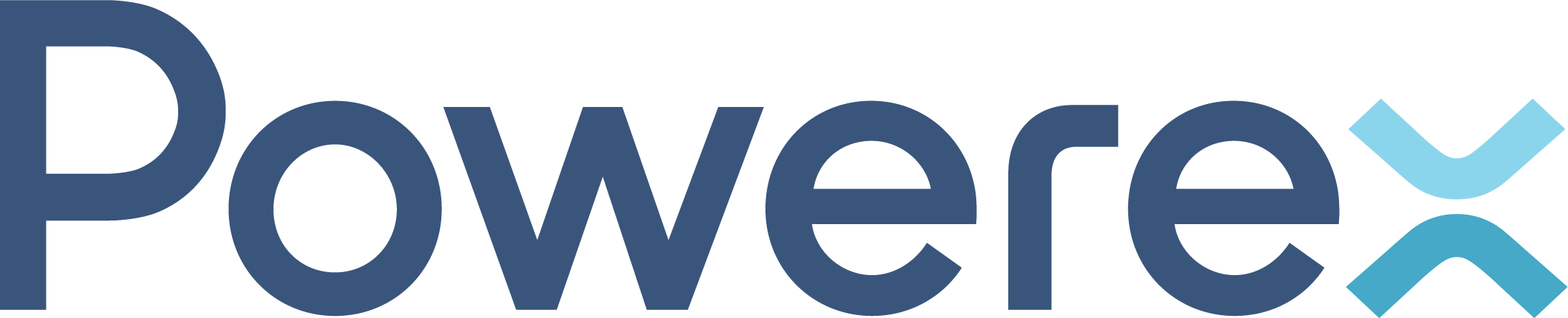
- Company type: Subsidiary
- Industry: Electricity wholesale
- Founded: 1988; 38 years ago
- Headquarters: Vancouver, British Columbia
- Key people: Tom Bechard (CEO)
- Parent: BC Hydro
- Website: www2.powerex.com

Powerex Corp is the wholly owned energy marketing and trading subsidiary of BC Hydro. Powerex buys and sells wholesale electricity, natural gas and environmental energy products and services in Western North America (WECC). In business since 1988, Powerex Corp is headquartered in Vancouver, British Columbia. Powerex also markets the Canadian Entitlement energy from the Columbia River Treaty.

== See also ==
- Alberta interdependence
- Western Interconnection
