= Electricity policy of Alberta =

Electric Utilities Act
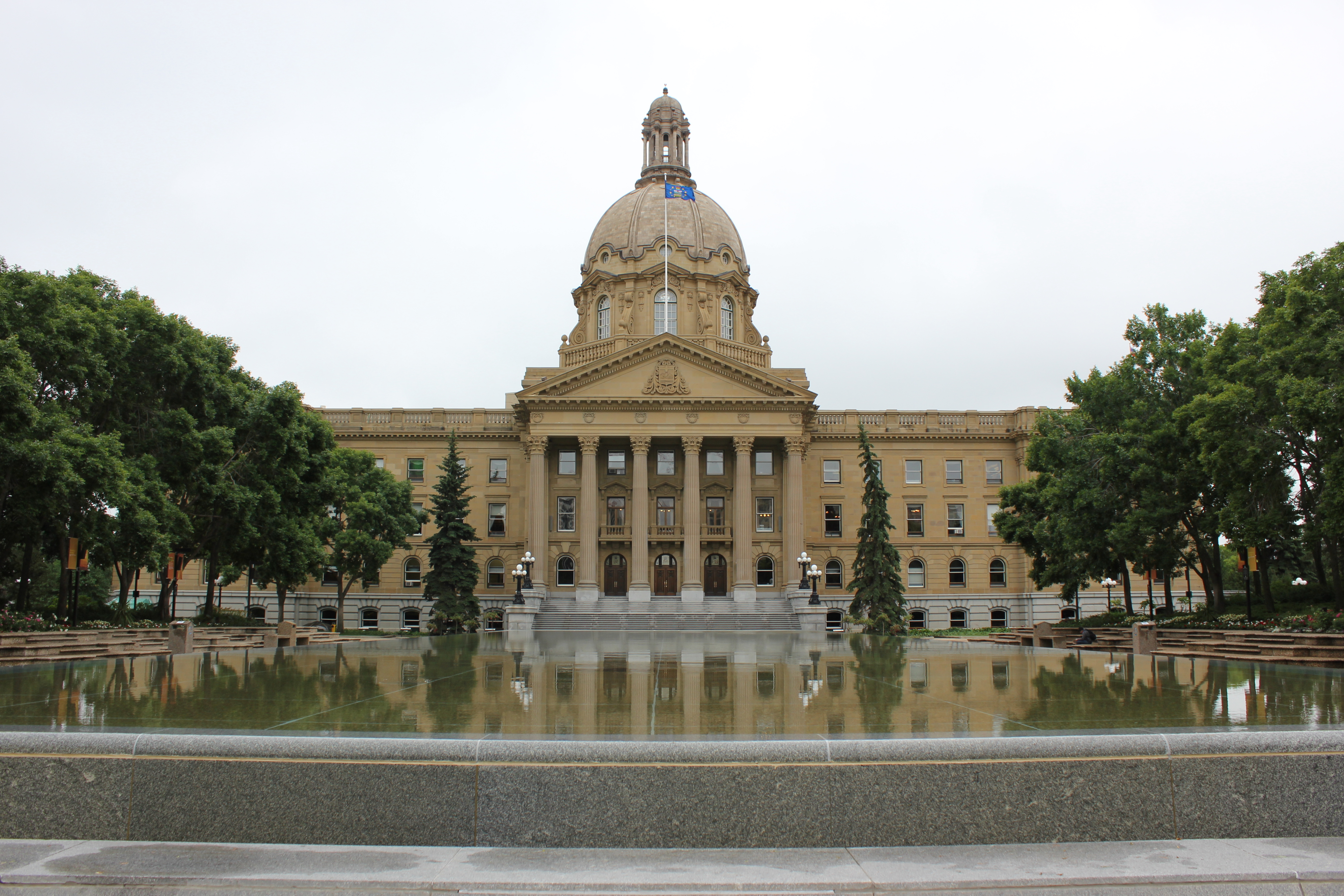

Legislative Assembly of Alberta
- Citation: Chapter E-5.1, 2003
- Territorial extent: Alberta
- Status: In force (amended)

The electricity policy of Alberta, enacted through several agencies, is to create an electricity sector with a competitive market that attracts investors, while providing consumers with reliable and affordable electricity, as well as reducing harmful pollution to protect the environment and the health of Albertans, according to their 2022 website.

The underlying framework for the regulation of Alberta's electric industry is the Electric Utilities Act. The Act began Alberta's deregulated electricity market in 1996, where the province began to restructure its electricity market away from traditional cost-of-service regulation to a market-based system. The Act established arms-length agencies that oversee the province's electricity system—the Alberta Electric System Operator (AESO), the Balancing Pool, the Alberta Utilities Commission (AUC), Utilities Consumer Advocate (UCA), and the Market Surveillance Administrator (MSA).

Coal used to account for 80% of all electricity generated in Alberta. By the end of 2019, with coal representing 36% of the generation mix and natural gas accounting for 54%, 89% of Alberta's electricity in Alberta was produced from fossil fuels. Eleven per cent is generated with renewables, including wind turbines, hydroelectric, geothermal, and biomass.

From 2000 until 2021, the average wholesale pool price on-peak times was approximately CA$70/MWh and CA$70/MWh during off peak times. On August 12, 2021, the average wholesale daily pool price was CA$142/MWh representing the highest price in 20 years, according to AESO data.

== Escalating prices ==
The price of electricity had dropped in 2015 to below 4 cents/KWh for the first time since 2003, during the economic recession when oil prices, and therefore commodity prices, had decreased. The last time electricity rates were this low, was in 2003. In 2017 another historic low was reached, 2.88 cents/kWh. By 2018 prices began to rise to the prices experienced before the 2014 economic downturn. Since the regulated rate option (RRO) which placed a price cap of 6.8 cents/kWh on electricity was scrapped by the UCP government in their fall 2019 budget, electricity rates and bills have spiked considerably. By January 2022, electricity rates and bills reached their highest price ever—more than 16 cents/kWh in Edmonton and Calgary, which did not include fees for distribution and transmission.

On January 22, 2021, EDC Associates reported twenty years of success in retail competition in Alberta's electricity sector. On-peak pool prices averaged $70/MWh over the 20-year period and off-peak prices averaged $31 per megawatt-hour (MWh). The Alberta Electric System Operator (AESO) administers the Power Pool, which is the only market for all electricity sales and purchases in the province. The highest price in the Power Pool in the two decades from 2000 through 2020, was $90/MWh.

In August 2021, based on AESO data, wholesale power prices in the province increased sharply to over twice the average 2020 Alberta Power Pool price. From January to August 2021 the average pool price was $103.51/MWh; in August it was $142/MWh representing the highest annual price of electricity in twenty years.

On March 7, 2022, Premier Kenney announced an electricity rebate of $150. NDP energy critic, Kathleen Ganley, said that this was not sufficient and called on the UCP government to consider capping electricity rates, implementing a "rebate program or a reverse rate rider". Ganley said the government should amend the 2022 budget to "provide real relief". The UCP Minister of Natural Gas and Electricity responded that rate caps, which had been used previously did not increase future capacity and only provided short-term relief. They said that they were not fiscally responsible as future generations would pay a high cost for their implementation.

When considering potential hourly power pool prices, the AESO considers market fundamentals such as the impacts of carbon pricing, the retirement of electricity generators and conversions of coal generators to gas, the price of natural gas, additions of renewable energy forms to the supply and power outages in generation units or in electricity transmission. The forecast for 2021 was $98/MWh and in 2022 it was expected to decrease by 25% to $74/MWh. In making forecasts, AESO considers Alberta Internal Load (AIL). It was projected to be higher in 2021 than 2020 because of anticipated extreme weather, pandemic recovery, oil price increase, and the province's economic growth because of oil sands production.

From September 30 to December 31, 2021, TransAlta, which is one of the utility companies that dominate Alberta's generation sector, reported an increase of $405 million in profits compared to the same period in 2020.

== Early history prior to deregulation ==
Compared to the rest of Canada, Alberta's cities were not large enough to be able to afford electrical systems until the 1880s and 1890s. Calgary became the first city to have an electrical system when the Calgary Electric Lighting Company (ELC) installed lights in 1887. Entrepreneurs received a permit for the construction of the Edmonton Electric Lighting and Power Company on October 23, 1891, and less than two months later on December 22 sections of Edmonton had electrical light for the first time. The permit was set to expire in 1909.

In 1921, the United Farmers of Alberta (UFA) party, with origins in a small populist movement of farmers calling for publicly owned rural electrification, won a majority government, and remained in power until 1935. The estimated cost of CA$200 million was prohibitive in the 1920s. In the 1930s, Prairies were the hardest hit because of the combination of the Dust Bowl drought and the Great Depression so any plans for electrification were paused. Although all across Canada, only one in five farms had electricity by 1945, the situation for rural Albertans was complicated by the fact that the existing private power monopolies had no motivation or interest in rural electrification given the steep cost.

In 1938, the Energy Utilities Board (EUB) succeeded the Petroleum and Natural Gas Conservation Board. The AEUB later became the Energy Resources Conservation Board (ERCB) and the Alberta Energy Regulator (AER). On June 17, 2013. The AER took over energy resource development's oversight in terms of full-lifecycle regulations.

In both the oil and gas sector and the electricity sector there were advocates of public ownership to promote, and facilitate the sectors' development while protecting them from potential private interests. The province's 1940 Royal Commission on Petroleum recommended government intervention in the embryonic oil and gas industry to promote, speed up, and expand the energy sector's development while preventing "fortune hunters" from causing "chaos" through over-production. Similarly, as in the oil and gas sector, the electricity sector had its advocates of public ownership in order to accelerate and spread electrification across the province.

By 1948, electrification was a highly charged issue in Alberta as the installation of new electricity lines was slower and more costly in rural areas than in the denser cities. Alberta's governing party, the Social Credit, added a electrification plebiscite to the ballot in the 1948 Alberta general election. The two referendum choices were the existing model in which municipal power plants and privately owned firms provided electricity or a publicly owned system that would be under the administration of an Alberta Government Power Commission. This was the fourth plebiscite in Alberta's history. Those supporting the existing model with private companies against government ownership won 50.03% to 49.97% with a "razor-thin" margin.The two major cities in Alberta, Calgary and the capital, Edmonton disagreed; the majority of voters in Edmonton supported provincial control, while an even larger majority in Calgary supported the existing mix of private and municipal companies. Despite the referendum result, the government sponsored the creation of many Rural Electrification Associations, of which some still exist today.

The municipality of Edmonton, was one of the early electricity facilities to convert to natural gas from coal, when its Rossdale plant made the switch in 1955.

In 1970, construction began on the Clover Bar generating station which was owned by the newly created Edmonton Power in a merger of "Edmonton's electrical distribution and power plant departments".

In order to "achieve equalization of electrical rates by averaging the price of generation and transmission across the province", the Electric Energy Marketing Agency was established in 1982 with the Public Utilities Board setting the "price at which utilities sell electric energy to the agency".

In a provincial-federal agreement the price of natural gas was deregulated in 1986 which resulted in a drop in the price of natural gas. Alberta let the Natural Gas Protection Plan expire. In the same year, two new departments—Energy, and Forestry and Lands and Wildlife were established replacing the Alberta Department of Energy and Natural Resources.

The first coal-fired steam turbine in Alberta was the Genesee generation unit, Genesee 2, which was built in 1989 with a capacity of 410 megawatts.

== Deregulation ==
Alberta has never owned and operated its own provincial power company, unlike most other Canadian provinces. In the 1990s, in response to power brownouts, the Alberta government under the premiership of Ralph Klein believed that competition would increase and prices decrease if more companies were producing power in the province. He believed that deregulation would make Alberta more attractive to business. The government created a strategy of power purchase agreements (PPAs) through which the winning bids in an auction would acquire the right to provide a portion of all the power produced in Alberta from 1996 to 2016. The PPAs would make all the decisions and cover costs of constructing power generation plants as well as bearing responsibility for all the financial risks. They would sell the power back to the grid with the "risks and rewards of fluctuating prices."

The restructuring of the electric utility industry began in the 1996. Through the restructuring process Alberta became the first Canadian province to implement a deregulated electricity market.The legislation that provided the new framework to regulate the electric utility industry was the Electric Utilities Act (EUA). Further restructuring took place through amendments to the 1996 Act, in the 1997 Electric Utilities Amendment Act. In 2003, provisions under the Act established new agencies that restructured the way the industry operates. This included the Alberta Electric System Operator (AESO), the Alberta Utilities Commission (AUC), and the Market Surveillance Administrator.

With electricity generation in this deregulated market, there is competition to sell energy in the electricity market at a price that is competitively determined. Private capital builds new generation plants and owners take on financial risks. This contrasts with the vertically integrated provincial government Crown corporations in other Canadian provinces, such as BC Hydro, SaskPower, Manitoba Hydro, Hydro-Québec and, historically, Ontario Hydro, that provide some utility services, In most Canadian provinces there is a conventional cost of service regulated power system.

According to Brennan, in 2008, some generation companies own both generation and transmission in Alberta. According to Keith Provost, a former senior vice-president of Alberta Power Ltd. (now ATCO Power) who worked in the electrical utility business for decades, AESO had its own system that is vulnerable to manipulation and is not a free-market system. Instead of marketing electricity contracts for future deliveries in a regulated market, AESO had its own system that is open to manipulation and is not a free-market system. Provost said that the deregulated system caused volatility in the price of electricity, kept consumer prices high while maximizing profits to generating companies.

Since 2000, Alberta's electrical market has been an Energy Only Market (EOM) in which the electricity producer only gets paid for generating electricity. In the EOM system, decisions about where facilities will be built, which technologies and the kind of energy source to be used remains with the producer often works with private investors who assume any risks associated with those choices. It is a simple system that can lead to more wholesale electricity price volatility.

With the passage of Bill 18, the Electricity Statutes (Capacity Market Termination) Amendment Act, the United Conservative Party (UCP) terminated plans by the previous government under Rachel Notley to overhaul the electricity system, to move away from the Energy Only Market to a capacity market. In a capacity market there is less price volatility as the electricity producer is not only paid to generate power, but also to maintain a higher level of capacity to be able to respond to demand peaks.

According to the IEA, from 1999 to 2009, in most provinces in Canada changes were made to the electricity sector's structure towards some market liberalization. From province to province the approaches to changing regulation and market design differed. The report said, that competitive wholesale markets were being fostered in the 1990s as part of the liberalization process. Of all the Canadian provinces, it was only Alberta that had an effective open market at the wholesale and retail level. According to the IEA, a few dominant integrated utilities provide the bulk of electricity generation, transmission and distribution services provide. The report recommended unbundling these services.

== Agencies ==
In 1996, Alberta began to restructure its electricity market away from traditional cost-of-service regulation to a market-based system which included the creation of arms length electricity sector agencies under the 1996 Electric Utilities Act. They were established to oversee the province's electricity system; to create an electricity system that is "reliable", "affordable", and that also reduces pollution that harms Albertans' health and the environment, while ensuring a competitive market for industry investors.

These agencies include the Alberta Electric System Operator (AESO), the Balancing Pool, the Alberta Utilities Commission (AUC), Utilities Consumer Advocate (UCA), and the Market Surveillance Administrator.

=== Alberta Electric System Operator (AESO) ===
The AESO has no industry affiliation and does not own market assets. It is an independent system operator that leads the planning and operation of the Alberta Interconnected Electric System (AIES) and the Balancing Pool. AESO facilitates open access to the grid by promoting a competitive electricity market. AESO engages with the electricity industry by consulting with retailers, electricity generators, and transmission facility owners such as AltaLink, ATCO, ENMAX, and EPCOR. AECO is governed by an independent board of directors appointed by the province's energy minister. The AESO collects and evaluates information about the industry. Penalties and fines are recommended by the MSA to be brought before the AUC.

=== Alberta Utilities Commission (AUC) ===
The Alberta Utilities Commission (AUC) replaced the Electric Utilities Board (EUB) in fully regulating utility distribution and transmission services provided by investor-owned utilities. The AUC decides penalties, rules, and takes in applications related to the electricity market. (Note: The AUC was established by the [www.auc.ab.ca/Pages/default.aspx Alberta Utilities Commission Act]. Its predecessors were the Public Utilities Board (PUB) and the Energy and Utilities Board (EUB).) As part of the restructuring the Energy Utilities Board no longer regulated wholesale electricity prices and customers could choose their electricity retailer. The EUA stipulated all electric energy bought and sold in Alberta had to be exchanged through the Power Pool which "served as an independent, central, open access pool." It functioned as a "spot market intending to match the demand with the lowest cost supply and establish an hourly pool price." Under the Energy Utilities Board (EUB)'s newly implemented restructured tariffs in the electric utility industry, "each major utility was required to apply to "separate its generation, transmission and distribution costs".

In southern Alberta, several areas suffered a rotating electricity outage on October 25, 1998, that was investigated by the province's electricity watchdog, EUB. In response to the November 4, 1998 EUB report a new industry-government task force was created and new regulations were introduced.

Regulated Rate Option (RRO) refers to the default regulated rate for electricity or floating rate option for small business and residential consumers that did not enter into a contract with one of the thirty retail electricity providers. RROs can change monthly. AUC regulates the five investor- and municipally owned companies that they approved to provide the Regulated Rate Option (RRO) service to Albertans—AltaGas Utilities, City of Lethbridge, Direct Energy Regulated Services (DERS), ENMAX Power. These RROs providers include Epcor Distribution and FortisAlberta for wire services, and ENMAX Power and EPCOR Energy for electricity. Based on geographic location in the province, the government has designated only one RRO electricity and natural gas provider for residential and business electricity consumers. Province-wide, there are only five RRO providers. Of these, four provide electricity and three provide natural gas. The City of Lethbridge is the RRO electricity provider for 34,000 customers in that municipality.

Alberta began to record Energy Emergency Alerts for electricity supply shortfall starting in 2000. Since then they have reported 42 EEAs, of which only two reached a level 3 in which the AESO had to call for "shedding of electricity load" or reducing service to consumers. The first occurred on July 24, 2006 and the second took place on July 9, 2012.

While the average wholesale pool price on-peak times was approximately CA$70/MWh since 2000, and CA$31/MWh during off peak times, the average price on August 12, 2021, was CA$142/MWh with an average of CA$103.51 for 2021 to date, representing the highest price in 20 years, according to AESO data.

=== Market Surveillance Administrator ===
The Market Surveillance Administrator (MSA) is the surveillance agency for the electricity market that monitors for competitive advantage. While the AESO has a role to collect information and recommend areas for evaluation, only the MSA can recommend penalties or fines to the AUC.

=== Balancing Pool ===
The Balancing Pool forecasts expenses and revenues and manages payments, and some power generation assets. It also sets out AESO's powers and responsibilities and implements policies. Among its provisions was the creation of the Power Pool of Alberta (Power Pool), a wholesale market clearing entity. Through the AESO, a spot market was created.

All electric energy that is bought and sold in the province is exchanged only through the Power Pool of Alberta—the central, not-for-profit, independent, and open access entity that has been operating the competitive wholesale electricity market and the dispatch of electricity generation since its establishment in 1996.

Local distribution utilities, either investor- or municipally owned, retained the obligation to supply and the 6 largest utilities were assigned a share of the output of existing generators at a fixed price.

The Power Pool is a not for profit entity that operated the "competitive wholesale market including dispatch of generation." The Power Pool matched the lowest-priced supply with demand functioning as spot market by establishing a pool price that was revised each hour based on 60 marginal prices each minute. Only those offers accepted generate power and receive the AESO pool price. All offers accepted to receive the same price, the pool price, not the price offered." Following the creation of the Power Pool, the price of electricity rose significantly, from the lowest price in North America to the third highest by 2001.

=== Utilities Consumer Advocate (UCA) ===
The Utilities Consumer Advocate (UCA) assists consumers in understanding their bundled energy bills which include both electricity and natural gas. The provides detailed information on their constantly updated website. This includes tools to help consumers choose one of the thirty retail electricity providers using cost comparison, and to provide assistance with understanding electricity bills that are highly detailed.

== Electricity generation mix ==
Coal-generated electricity was the backbone of Alberta's electrical sector. In 2013 coal accounted for 55% of the total, natural gas represented 35%, and renewable and alternative energy represented 11%. These cleaner sources included "wind, hydro, biomass and co-generation".

=== Coal ===
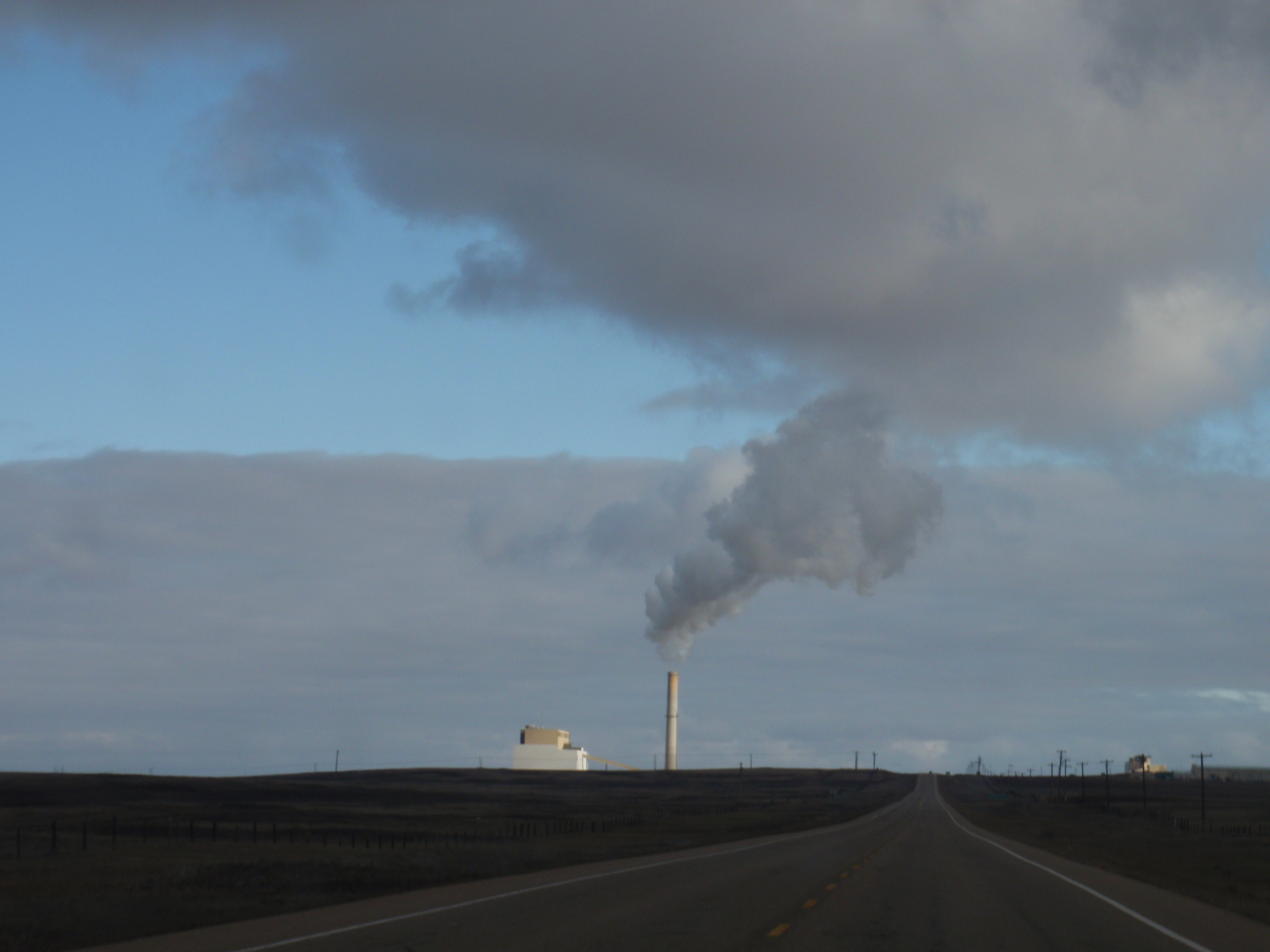
The Sheerness Generating Station, near Hanna. Commissioned in 1986, the 760-MW coal-fired power plant was a joint venture between ATCO and TransAlta. It underwent a coal-to-gas conversion.

Ninety per cent of Canada's usable coal resources, including different grades of coal, ranking from lignite the lower grade to semianthracite, are found in the Western Canadian Sedimentary Basin (WCSB), which underlie the three Western provinces of Alberta, British Columbia, and Saskatchewan. Lignite, which is used mainly for electricity generation, is easy to mine and has been used in Alberta since the 1800s to produce electricity.

Coal-fired power plants burning coal to generate electricity were the "backbone" of Alberta's electricity system.

The IEA reported that Alberta had the second highest GHG emission levels in Canada (190 Mt) represented 27% of Canada's total emissions. Only Ontario was higher with 234 Mt accounting for 33% of the nation's emissions in 2006. In 2007, a new policy was introduced to reduce GHG emissions by 12% starting with large emitters like coal-fired power plants, pulp mills and oil sands projects. Alberta was the first jurisdiction in North America to introduce a carbon tax—the Specified Gas Emitters Regulation, or SGER was considered to be a success story.

Installed capacity reached 12,834 megawatts in 2009, with coal (5,692 MW) and natural gas (5,189 MW) representing the bulk of the province's generation fleet.

In 2013, Alberta's generation mix continued to be "dominated by coal" at 55%, natural gas at 35%, and renewable and alternative sources at 11%, which included "wind, hydro, biomass and co-generation", according to the 2017 International Energy Agency (IEA) report. (Note: The International Energy Agency (IEA) is an autonomous intergovernmental organisation of the Organisation for Economic Co-operation and Development (OECD) which was established in 1974 in response to the 1973 oil crisis) The next biggest source of electricity came from natural gas which had increased its representation from at 29% in 2004 to 35% in 2013. By 2013, renewable and alternative energy represented 11% of the generation mix and included wind farms, hydroelectric, biomass and co-generation.

According to Alberta economists, Andrew Leach and Blake Shaffer, the percentage of Alberta generation mix supplied by coal had dropped from 50% in 2015 to 27% in 2020, without an increase in the price of electricity or a disruption of service during the 5-year transition period.

TransAlta chose to move quickly to shift from coal-fired plants to natural gas that was partially financed by Brookfield Renewable Partners' CA$750-million investment. By February 2, 2021, TransAlta had converted the first of three planned conversions. By the end of December, 2021, TransAlta had completed full conversion from thermal coal to natural gas at its Keephills Unit 3 facility, which is located near Keephills, Alberta. TransAlta retired Sundance Power Station Unit 1 in 2017, 2 in 2018, and 3 in 2020, 5 in 2021. Sundance 6 was converted to natural gas in 2021. Keephills Generating Station Unit 1 in Duffield was retired in 2021. Keephills Units 2, and 3 were converted to natural gas in 2021. Both Sheerness Unit 1 and 2 were converted to natural gas in 2021 and 2020. Provincial and federal carbon prices and carbon taxes were among the factors that turned coal into a liability instead of an asset, according to TransAlta. Sundance Power Station units 4 & 5 began operations in 2021.

Milner Power's H. R. Milner Generating Station in Grande Cache in west central Alberta was commissioned in 1972 as a coal-fired power station. In 2011, the Alberta Utilities Commission granted Milner's interim approval to expand from a 150-megawatt coal-fired facility to a 500-megawatt facility without any public hearing or notice of application. Concerns were raised by Ecojustice and the Pembina Institute as federal greenhouse gas regulations were coming in effect in 2015. By 2011, of all Canadian provinces, Alberta with its eleven coal-fired plants, had the most.

In 2023, coal accounted for just 12% of total electricity generation and was fully phased out June 16, 2024.

=== Natural gas ===
Natural gas has been a major contributor to Alberta's electricity generation mix, second only to coal for many decades. Natural gas made up 29% in 2004 and 35% in 2013. By 2023, 69% of Alberta's electricity was generated from natural gas.

=== Cogeneration ===
Cogeneration, also known as Combined Heat and Power (CHP), refers to power plants that produce both heat and electricity simultaneously. In Alberta's oil sands, steam generated for oil extraction and upgrading activities is also used to generate power. A typical oil sands cogeneration plant captures exhaust heat from the gas turbine in a boiler or steam generator, sending low-pressure steam to a neighboring bitumen plant. Cogeneration facilities tend to operate continuously regardless of the price for power to support industrial activities. Cogeneration provides a significant share of Alberta's total electricity, more than other natural gas technology types

=== Renewables ===
The wind sector, particularly in southern Alberta has seen significant growth from 1.1% of total generation in 2005, to 12% in 2023.

==== Hydroelectricity ====
In the 1910s, Alberta built hydropower facilities. But the construction of coal-fired and natural gas-fired facilities outpaced hydropower.

In the 1950s, hydroelectric power provided 50% of Alberta's electricity, but by 2010, this has decreased to 7%. In 2018, there were no proposals for hydroelectric projects.

By 2018, Alberta was behind other provinces in developing renewable energy. In the 44 years that the Progressive Conservative party was in power, oil and gas production, not renewable energy was the priority.

In their 2020 "Final Report for Alberta Utilities Commission Update on Alberta's Hydroelectricity Energy Resources", Hatch consultancy evaluated Alberta river basin's potential for development: Athabasca River Basin: 13,050 GWh; Churchill River Basin: No hydroelectric potential; Hay River Basin: 100 GWh; Milk River Basin: No hydroelectric potential; North Saskatchewan River Basin: 8,270 GWh; Peace River Basin: 19,720 GWh; Red Deer River: 340 GWh; Slave River Basin: 7,640 GWh; South Saskatchewan River Basin: 3,930 GWh.

Hydroelectricity has been Canada's biggest source of electricity historically. However, many facilities are aging and are in need of expensive repairs. The high cost of construction has often led to overruns and with many other less expensive renewable options, future hydroelectric projects should be considered with caution.

==== Wind ====
The first commercial wind farm in Canada, the TransAlta's Cowley Ridge wind plant, near Pincher Creek, Alberta was completed in 1993.

By 2006 TransAtla wind farms were constrained at the 400 megawatts of wind power, because the installation of power lines was not keeping pace with the construction of wind turbines.

Only 40% of wind turbines in Canada were commissioned before 2010. Over time they got bigger and taller, and their capacity and sophistication increased, according to the federal Natural Resources department's senior wind engineer. By 2010 wind capacity had reached 657 MW and hydroelectric capacity produced 900 MW.

By 2020, Alberta had 900 wind turbines. Only two provinces had more; Ontario had 2,663 turbines, which represented approximately 40% of Canada's total, and Quebec had 1,991.

==== Solar and geothermal ====
Bill 36, The Geothermal Resource Development Act, was introduced on October 20, 2020, to create clear policies and regulations for the "emerging industry" to encourage investment in geothermal resource development in Alberta. There is over 388,500 MW untapped geothermal generation in Alberta. In 2020, Alberta's total installed generating capacity was 16,515.13 MW by way of comparison.

Terrapin Geothermics' CA$90-million-dollar Greenview Geothermal Power Plant (Alberta No. 1) in the Municipal District of Greenview No. 16, which is expected to be online by 2023, received CA$25.45 million in funding from Natural Resources Canada (NRCan). The facility will be the first to produce geothermal energy in Alberta.

== Hydrogen ==
Pennsylvania-based Air Products is constructing a CA$1.3-billion "net-zero hydrogen energy complex" near Edmonton which when completed in 2024 will use natural gas to produce the clean-burning hydrogen fuel. Air Products already has three hydrogen facilities in the province. Hydrogen will be used to generate electricity.

== Environmental policies ==
One of the Alberta's government's major legislations in terms of jurisdiction over the Energy Resources and Conservation Board (ERCB) was the 1960 Gas Utilities Act.

In 1961, new provincial air-quality standards were introduced limiting hydrogen sulphide and sulphur dioxide emissions.

In response to the Rio de Janeiro June 1992 United Nations Conference on Environment and Development, Canada and over 160 other nations agree to work towards sustainable development by limiting greenhouse gas emissions that impact global climate change.

In 1994, Alberta's Department of Environmental Protection was created with the merger of two departments, the Department of Forestry and the Department of Land and Wildlife. The Department of Energy was divided into 5 newly created divisions.

In 1995 the Alberta Energy and Utilities Board (AEUB) was established through a merger of Public Utilities Board merged with the Energy Resources and Conservation Board (ERCB) to increase efficiency and to streamline the process of regulating energy and utilities. ERCB was previously the Petroleum and Natural Gas Conservation Board. ERCB became the Alberta Energy Regulator in 2013.

As of 2008, Alberta's electricity sector was the most carbon-intensive of all Canadian provinces and territories, with total emissions of 55.9 million tonnes of CO_{2} equivalent in 2008, accounting for 47% of all Canadian emissions in the electricity and heat generation sector.

By 2013, shale gas had become a significant part of the gas supply. A 2012 Natural Resources Canada study concluded that environmental impacts from shale gas in terms of GHG emissions were significantly less than those of coal. which corroborated findings in the United States.

Based on the December 2020 IEA's tenth edition of their annual market report on coal, globally the shift towards clean energy away from carbon-intensive fuels, such as coal, to reduce GHG emissions, accelerated. The IEA report said the demand for coal had peaked globally in 2013. Factors that contributed to the decrease in global demand, included the increase in the production of gas as part of the United States shale revolution, the accelerated increase in wind and solar energy production, and increase in enactment of public policies related to climate change. In 2017 and 2018 there was a brief rebound in the demand for coal. Although the global share of electricity generation only fell from 40% in 2009 to 36.5% in 2019, most of coal-generators were in India and China.

== Market components ==
Alberta's electricity market consists of six fundamental components and features.

=== Generation ===
Seventeen firms supply electricity into the grid. Five of those providers—ATCO Power, Enmax, Capital Power Corporation, TransAlta and TransCanada Corp.—supply about 80% of the province's generation capacity.

The generation sector in Alberta is dominated by TransAlta (formerly Calgary Power), ENMAX, and Capital Power Corporation, a spin-off of Edmonton's municipally owned company EPCOR. Utility companies in Alberta also include the wind generating Bullfrog Power, TransAlta Corporation, Alberta Power limited, AltaLink, ATCO Power and FortisAlberta. Although 5,700 megawatts of new generation was added and 1,470 megawatts from old plants were retired between 1998 and 2009, coal still accounted for 73.8% of utility-generated power in 2007, followed by natural gas, with 20.6%.

Calgary-based utility company TransAlta reported an increase of $405 million in the three-month period from September 30 to December 31, 2021, compared to 2020.

=== Transmission ===
Alberta's transmission grid, owned in sections by companies like TransAlta, AltaLink and ATCO Electric, then carries electricity produced by generating providers to wholesale electricity purchasers or retailers. Connections to BC, Saskatchewan and Montana allow imports and exports of competitive power.

=== Wholesale purchasers ===
There are about 160 wholesale electricity purchasers, many of which are also resellers to other end-users like ENMAX, EPCOR, FortisAlberta, and Direct Energy.

=== Supply ===
From 1998 to 2008, more than 4,700 megawatts (MW) of new generation were added to the province's power supply.

Although 5,700 megawatts of new generation was added and 1,470 megawatts from old plants were retired between 1998 and 2009, coal still accounted for 73.8% of utility-generated power in 2007, followed by natural gas, with 20.6%.

=== Demand ===
In 2017, Alberta was the fourth highest consumer of electricity per capita in Canada representing "consumption of "28% more than the national average" with an "annual electricity consumption per capita" of 18.7-megawatt hours (MW.h). Demand for electricity had grown by 22% between 2005 and 2017.

During the COVID-19 pandemic, annual demand for electricity decreased in 2020 and expanded by about 3% by 2021, as the province's economy recovered.

==== Residential sector ====
The residential sector includes home heating and cooling systems, household appliances, water heaters, and lighting.

Retail consumers have the option to buy electricity at competitive prices from third-party sellers like Just Energy or at regulated prices through the local utility like ENMAX and EPCOR.

===== Electricity costs for end-users =====
According to Statista in 2021, compared to other Canadian provinces and territories, the electricity costs for end-users in Alberta at 16.6 cents per kWh, was below the average of 17.9 cents per kWh. The highest rates were in the Northwest Territories and Nunavut at 38.2 and 37.6. The lowest costs were in Québec at 7.3. Manitoba at 9.9, British Columbia at 12.6, New Brunswick at 12.7, Ontario at 13, and Newfoundland and Labrador at 13.8 were all lower than Alberta. Statista said Québec's electricity was less expensive because of the number of hydroelectric dams throughout the province. The NWTs and Nunavut pay the most because of their remote location which often rely diesel fuel to generate electricity.

A 2013 study compared the unit price of electricity in major cities in Canada and the United States. Calgary's unit price was 14.81 cents per kWh, compared to 6.87 cents per kWh in Montreal, 15.45 in Halifax. In April 2013, Calgary ranked third (with an average monthly payment of $216 based on monthly consumption of 1,000 kWh) and Edmonton fourth ($202 a month) in Canada compared to other cities in terms of high electricity bills. Halifax placed first and worst in Canada at $225 a month. Compared to other cities in North America, Calgary and Edmonton placed seventh and eighth in terms of the highest power costs. Vancouver, BC was among the least expensive ($130 a month). In Alberta, energy spending (without gasoline costs) represents 2.3% of total household spending. (Note: An electricity bill includes retail charges, such as local access fees, GST, balancing pool allocation, energy charge, and administration charge; and regulated charges, which includes delivery charges. Calculations on a utility bill are based on consumption in the billing period per kilowatt-hour (kWh) for electricity and per gigajoule (GJ) for natural gas. See AUC current electricity rates)

Following the restructuring and deregulation that began in 1996 electricity rates for consumers increased disproportionately to the cost of generating electricity. The cost of generating electricity was approximately 3.5 cents per kilowatt hour in 2000. The average price for consumers was over 13 cents per kWh. Provost said that electricity generators' revenue increased by about CA$2 or CA$ billion annually because consumers paid more for electricity.

In response to consumers complaints about high prices in 2001, the government implemented a Regulated Rate Option (RRO), as a means to shield consumers from price volatility.

Electricity rates in Alberta dropped to less than 4 cents per kWh in 2015.

An historic low in electricity prices in the province was reached in 2017, when they dropped to 2.88 cents/kWh.

Under the electricity price cap that had regulated electricity rates introduced by the NDP, consumers who had the regulated rate option (RRO) with the regulated rate option (RRO) paid a maximum of 6.8 cents per kWh.

Since 2018, electricity rates in Alberta have been steadily climbing.

Premier Jason Kenney scrapped the Alberta electricity price cap that had regulated electricity rates in the fall 2019 provincial budget.

In January 2022 electricity rates reached a record high of more than above 16 cents/kWh in Edmonton and Calgary. Transmission and distributions fees were added on top of the electricity rate.

==== Commercial sector ====
Commercial sector includes commercial heating and cooling systems as well as lighting in commercial buildings and offices.

The commercial sector consumed 17.2 TW.h of electricity in 2017 and the residential sector consumed 10.3 TW.h.

==== Industrial sectors ====
The industrial sector includes mining activities, such as oil sands, coal-mining, manufacturing activities, construction and forestry. Industrial consumers account for approximately 28% of electricity consumed in Ontario. This consumption is projected to remain stable.

=== Cross border wholesale market ===
Alberta imports and exports according to market conditions with Montana and neighbouring provinces, British Columbia and Saskatchewan. BC and Saskatchewan have agreements with Alberta called "interties" through which the Available Transfer Capability (ATC) is specified.

Despite the vast differences in market design and because of large differences in the mix of generation assets, the electricity systems of Alberta and British Columbia enjoy a unique symbiotic relationship. B.C. may provide a market for Alberta's off-peak surplus and a peaking supply for Alberta's crunch periods. The investment climate in Alberta has attracted a steady stream of private investors-funded generation projects since 1996. This is one of the reasons Alberta's electricity system has provided reliable, sustainable power even during periods of rapid economic growth.

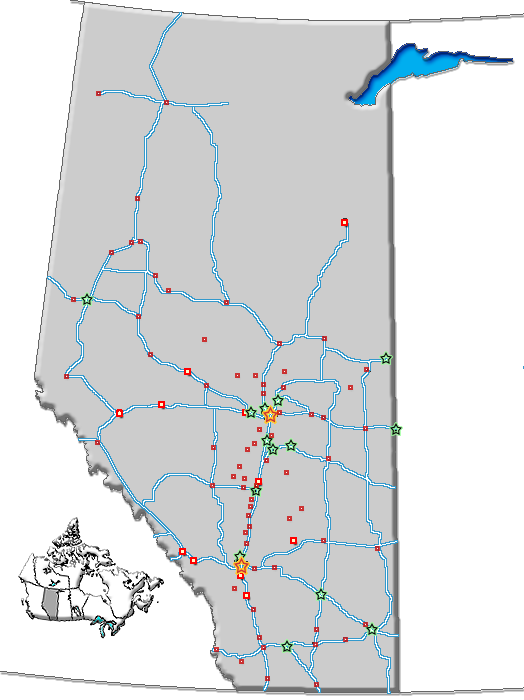

Distribution of cities in Alberta

Alberta and neighbouring British Columbia are buyers and sellers of each other's power. Historically, commercial parties in Alberta import energy during peak demand period. Similarly, exports from Alberta frequently occur during off-peak periods (weekends, evenings, or statutory holidays when demand in Alberta diminishes or when there is an abundance of wind energy during off-peak periods). This energy trade confers benefits on both provinces.

The power trade between the two provinces is based in part on geography. Alberta historically has had coal and natural gas, while B.C.'s generation is largely hydro-electric.

Whether for reasons of temporary high demand, short supply or both, commercial parties in Alberta buy electricity from its western neighbour through Alberta Electric System Operator. By contrast, commercial parties might export electricity in Alberta during off-peak periods. During that period, B.C. uses that power to reduce its hydroelectric generation or that energy is wheeled through to the Pacific Northwest wholesale electricity market.

Commercial parties in Alberta buy electricity from B.C. during periods of peak consumption, on unusually cold or hot days or when a larger-than-normal number of generators are down for maintenance. Historically, British Columbia bought electricity from Alberta during off-peak periods. More recently, purchases from Alberta tend to take place when there is an abundance of wind generation during periods of low demand in Alberta. This trade benefits both provinces to make use of their generating and storage capacity and use assets more efficiently. Also, it puts competitive pressure on power prices in both provinces.

Electricity imports from Alberta represent just 3% of all imports into B.C. In fact, B.C. exports six times as much as it imports from Alberta, which helps to substantially reduce greenhouse gas emissions there.

== See also ==
- Hydro-Québec's electricity transmission system
- Electricity policy of Ontario
- Coal in Alberta
- List of generating stations in Alberta
