= Sierra Energy =

American waste-to-energy company

- Company type: Private
- Industry: Waste-to-Energy
- Founded: 2004; 21 years ago
- Founder: Mike G. Hart
- Headquarters: Davis. California, United States
- Products: Pathfinder
- Number of employees: 35
- Parent: Sierra Railroad

Sierra Energy is a privately owned developer of waste-to-energy gasification technology FastOx. Sierra Energy is a division of Sierra Railroad. It is headquartered at the Sierra Energy Research Park in Davis, California and its first facility is located in Monterey, California.

== History ==
FastOx gasification was developed by two Kaiser Steel engineers, Bruce Claflin and John Jasbinsek, that was originally designed to reduce pollution during steel production. When Kaiser closed their Fontana plant in 1983, workers tossed all demolition material into the blast furnace. Claflin and Jasbinsek realized that the furnace could take garbage as well. Claflin’s grandson, Chris Kasten, pitched the idea at the University of California, Davis' Graduate School of Management's 2003 Big Bang! Business Competition. The concept caught the eye of Mike G. Hart, a local railroad company CEO and a judge at the competition.

After securing rights to the technology, Hart founded Sierra Energy, a division of Sierra Railroad, in 2004 to use this technology to create clean fuel for his fleet of locomotives. In 2009, the technology was selected for construction and testing at the U.S. Army’s Renewable Energy Testing Center at McClellan Business Park, an independent testing facility funded by the U.S. Department of Defense (DoD).

In 2013, the DoD, aided by grant funding from the California Energy Commission, entered into an agreement with Sierra Energy for the construction of Sierra's first commercial FastOx gasifier at U.S. Army Garrison Fort Hunter Liggett in Monterey, California. The system was the first waste-to-energy technology acquired by the Department of Defense. In 2015, Sierra was awarded a $100,000 federal grant from the Defense Logistics Agency to test production of hydrogen from municipal waste., In 2016, Sierra received an unconfirmed investment from SteelRiver Infrastructure Partners for which SteelRiver would receive a minority interest in Sierra Energy’s holding company, Sierra Railroad. Sierra’s 20 metric ton per day gasifier at Fort Hunter Liggett was built in 2017 and will be testing multiple product outputs including electricity and renewable diesel. In 2019, Sierra closed a $33 million Series A investment round led by Bill Gates' Breakthrough Energy Ventures.

== Technology: FastOx gasification ==
The Sierra Energy FastOx gasifier is a type of gasifier developed from a modified blast furnace, that the company claims is capable of converting nearly any type of waste into synthesis gas. Instead of using air as traditional blast furnaces do, gasification injects oxygen and steam instead, resulting in extremely high temperatures (2000 °C) that drive the chemical reaction to break down waste without producing ash or other contaminants that need to be landfilled. The system is modular.

== Scale up ==
Sierra's first facility was built in partnership with the U.S. Army and the California Energy Commission at Fort Hunter Liggett. This waste gasification system began testing in January 2020 to convert biomass and municipal solid waste to electricity and diesel. The company is currently working on developing their flagship Pathfinder system which can handle up to 50-metric-tons of waste per day.
