= British Columbia Utilities Commission =

Government agency in British Columbia, Canada

The British Columbia Utilities Commission (BCUC) is an independent agency of the Government of British Columbia responsible for regulating rates and standards of service quality. The Commission's primary responsibility is the regulation of British Columbia's natural gas and electricity utilities. They also regulate intra-provincial pipelines and the Insurance Corporation of British Columbia (ICBC), a crown corporation responsible for insuring vehicles and operators in the province.

Apart from rates and services, the BCUC is also responsible for ensuring that shareholders of utilities are afforded a reasonable opportunity to earn a fair return on their invested capital, that competitive interests are not frustrated, and that government energy policy is practically implemented. In addition, it approves the development of infrastructure planned by utilities and their issuance of securities, establishes tolls and conditions of service for intraprovincial oil pipelines, and has responsibility for electric power transmission facilities and energy supply contracts. The BCUC also reviews energy-related matters referred to it by Cabinet, which usually involve public hearings, followed by a report and recommendations to Cabinet.

With respect to ICBC, the Commission is responsible for ensuring that service to basic automobile insurance policyholders is adequate, efficient, just and reasonable, and that ICBC optional insurance is not subsidized by other ICBC operations.

The BCUC has quasi-judicial responsibilities, and may make legally binding rulings (subject to court appeal). It is governed by its enabling statute, the Utilities Commission Act, other legislation and regulations including the Administrative Tribunals Act, Pipeline Act, and — with respect to ICBC — provisions of the Insurance Corporation Act.

The BCUC works to maintain processes that are fair, transparent and inclusive. The BCUC values input from British Columbians, and is committed to issuing well-reasoned, evidence-based decisions.

In addition to its regulatory responsibilities, the Commission provides the following services and assistance:

- reviews ratepayers' complaints about the actions of utilities;
- provides copies of documentation prepared by the Commission;
- provides access to regulated utilities' tariffs and information filed in public hearings;
- responds to requests for general information regarding utilities.

The Commission has been self-funded since 1988. Its annual budget ranges from $4.6 to $4.7 million, with its costs recovered primarily through a levy on the energy utilities and pipelines companies that it regulates.

The BCUC describes its mission as follows: The BCUC's mission is to ensure that ratepayers receive safe, reliable and non-discriminatory energy services at fair rates from the utilities it regulates, and that shareholders of those utilities are afforded a reasonable opportunity to earn a fair return on their invested capital.
