= Rhododendron Mountain =

Mountain in British Columbia, Canada

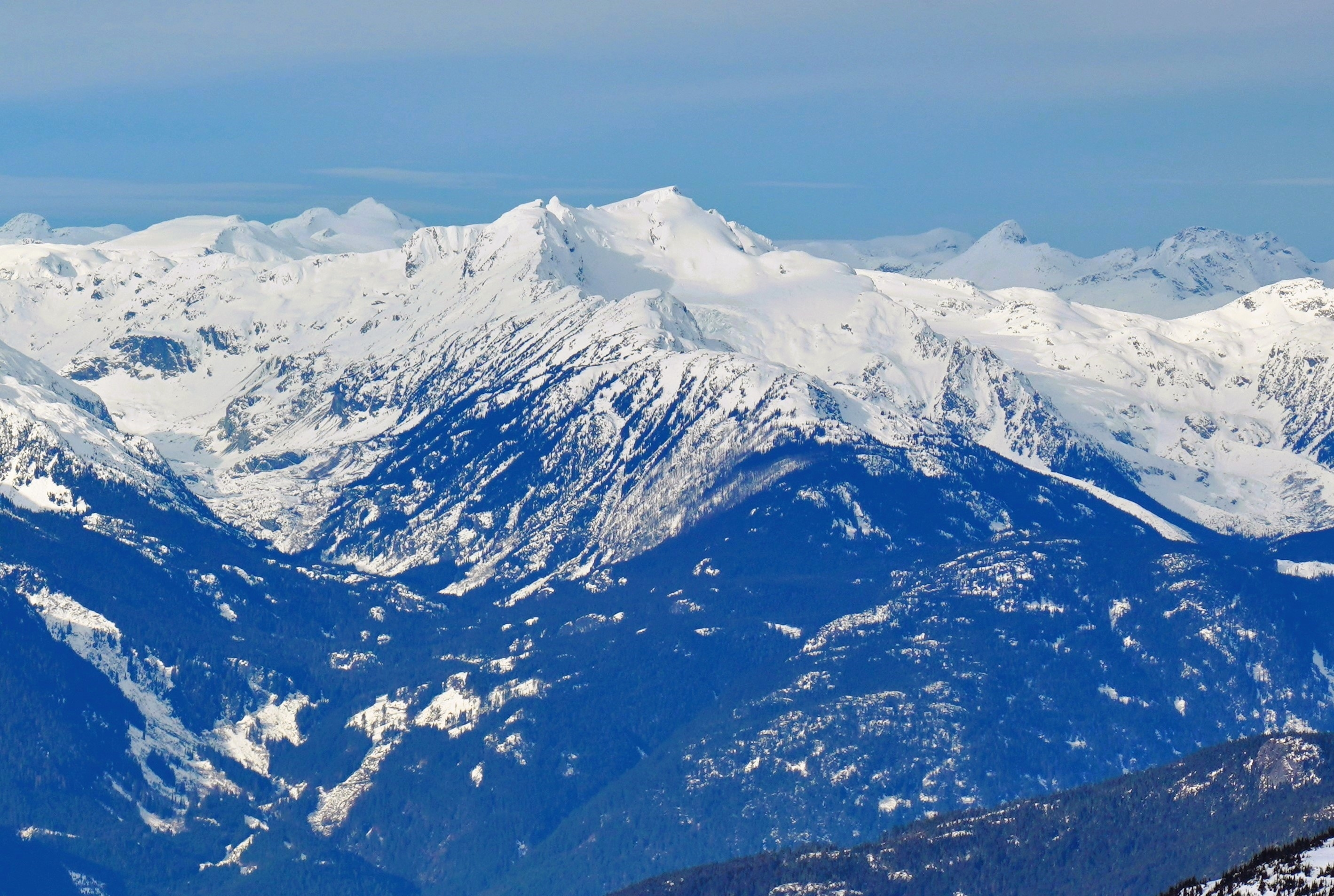
- East aspect, viewed from Mt. Taylor

Highest point
- Elevation: 2,523 m (8,278 ft)
- Prominence: 715 m (2,346 ft)
- Parent peak: Ipsoot Mountain (2,576 m)
- Isolation: 5.64 km (3.50 mi)
- Listing: Mountains of British Columbia
- Coordinates: 50°22′18″N 123°01′50″W

Naming
- Etymology: Rhododendron

Geography
- Location within British Columbia Location within Canada
- Interactive map of Rhododendron Mountain
- Location: British Columbia, Canada
- District: Lillooet Land District
- Parent range: Coast Mountains
- Topo map: NTS 92J6 Ryan River

Rhododendron Mountain is a 2,523-metre (8,278-foot) glaciated summit in British Columbia, Canada.

== Description ==
Rhododendron Mountain is located in the Coast Mountains, 17 kilometres (11 mi) west-northwest of Pemberton and 5.9 kilometres (3.7 mi) north of Ipsoot Mountain. Precipitation runoff and glacial meltwater from this mountain drains into Ryan River, Miller Creek and Rutherford Creek, which all flow to the Lillooet River. Rhododendron Mountain is more notable for its steep rise above local terrain than for its absolute elevation as topographic relief is significant with the summit rising over 1,300 metres (4,265 ft) above Rutherford Creek in approximately five kilometres (3.1 mi). The mountain's local toponym was officially adopted January 23, 1979, by the Geographical Names Board of Canada.

== Climate ==
Based on the Köppen climate classification, Rhododendron Mountain is located in the marine west coast climate zone of western North America. Most weather fronts originate in the Pacific Ocean, and travel east toward the Coast Mountains where they are forced upward by the range (Orographic lift), causing them to drop their moisture in the form of rain or snowfall. As a result, the Coast Mountains experience high precipitation, especially during the winter months in the form of snowfall. Winter temperatures can drop below −20 °C with wind chill factors below −30 °C. This climate supports the Ipsoot Icefield surrounding the peak. The months July through September offer the most favorable weather for climbing Rhododendron Mountain.

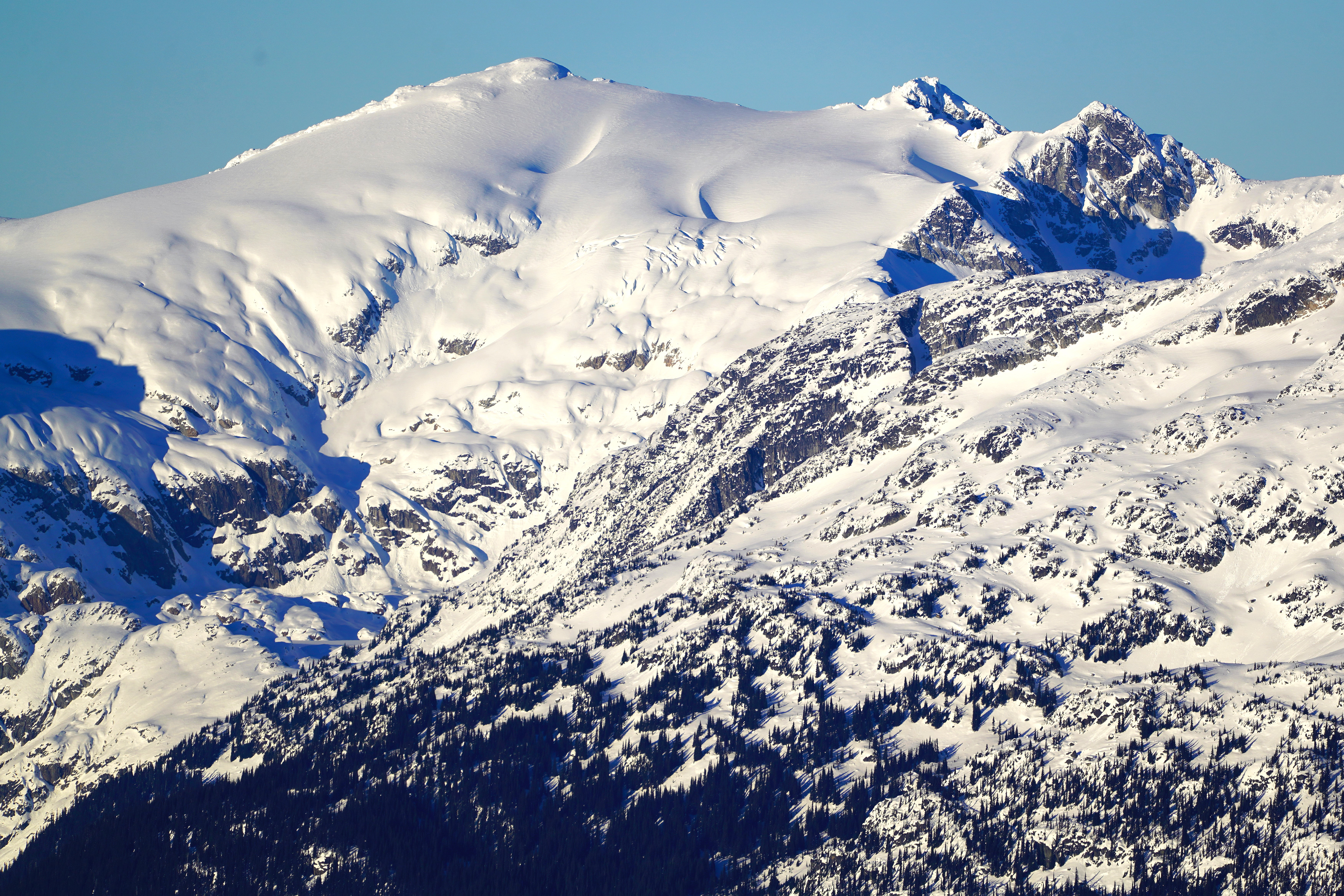
South aspect of Rhododendron Mountain in winter, viewed from Rainbow Mountain

== See also ==
- Geography of British Columbia
- Geology of British Columbia
