= Sisqa Peak =

Mountain in British Columbia, Canada

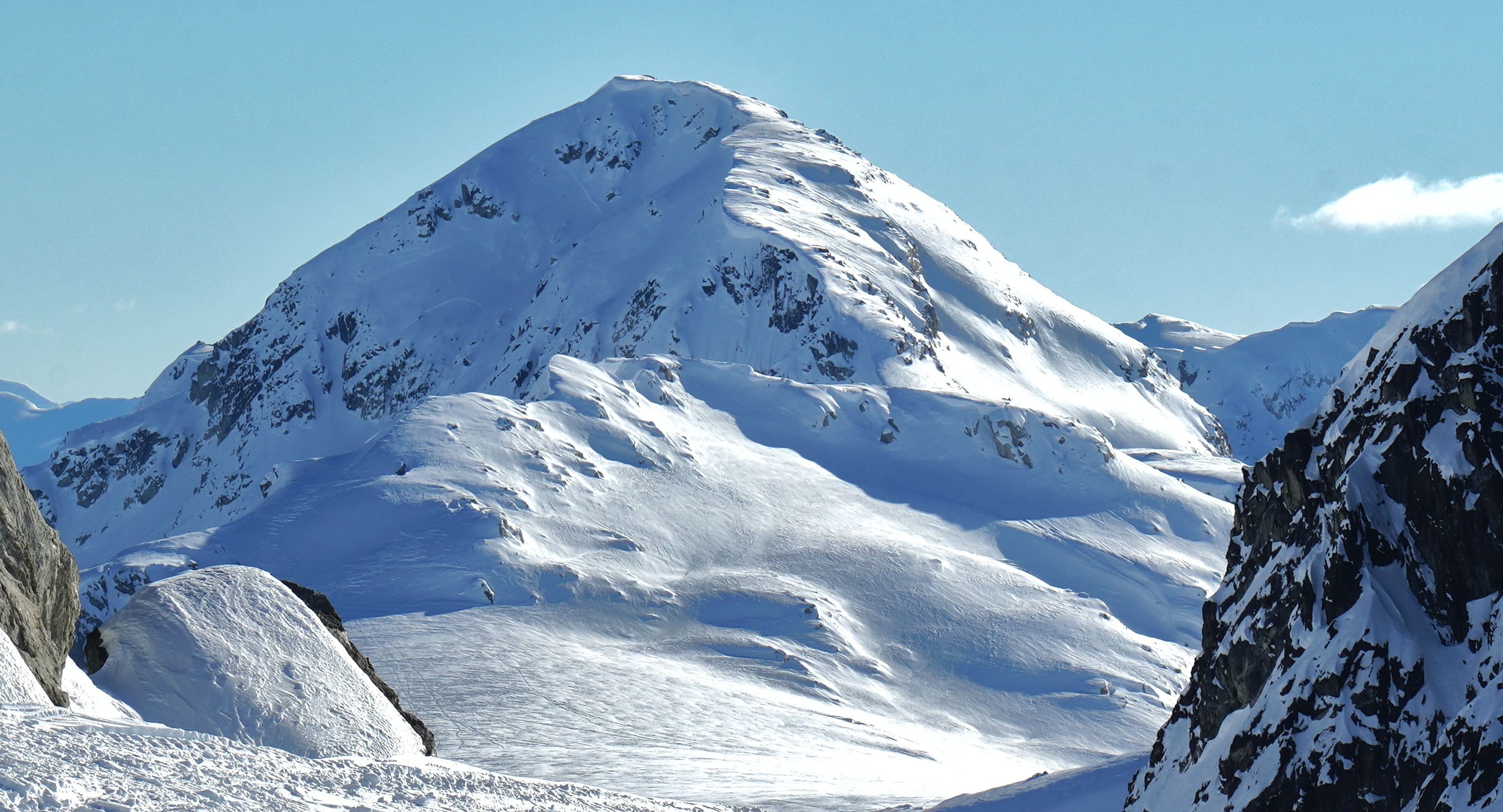
- North aspect

Highest point
- Elevation: 2,357 m (7,733 ft)
- Prominence: 245 m (804 ft)
- Isolation: 4.91 km (3.05 mi)
- Coordinates: 50°19′20″N 123°10′40″W

Geography
- Location within British Columbia Location within Canada
- Interactive map of Sisqa Peak
- Country: Canada
- Province: British Columbia
- District: Lillooet Land District
- Parent range: Coast Mountains
- Topo map: NTS 92J6 Ryan River

Sisqa Peak is a 2,357-metre (7,733-foot) mountain in British Columbia, Canada.

== Description ==
Sisqa Peak is located 27 kilometres (17 mi) west of Pemberton, in the Pemberton Icefield of the Coast Mountains. Precipitation runoff and glacial meltwater from this mountain drains into the Soo River and Rutherford Creek, which are both tributaries of the Green River, which in turn is a tributary of the Lillooet River. Topographic relief is significant with the summit rising 1,400 metres (4,593 ft) above the Soo Valley in approximately six kilometres (3.7 mi). The mountain's toponym was officially adopted on 15 January 1987 by the Geographical Names Board of Canada. "Sisqa" is the Lil'wat word for "uncle."

== Climate ==
Based on the Köppen climate classification, Sisqa Peak is located in the marine west coast climate zone of western North America. Most weather fronts originating in the Pacific Ocean travel east toward the Coast Mountains where they are forced upward by the range (orographic lift), causing them to drop their moisture in the form of rain or snowfall. As a result, the Coast Mountains experience high precipitation, especially during the winter months in the form of snowfall. Winter temperatures can drop below −10 °C with wind chill factors below −20 °C.

== See also ==
- Geography of British Columbia
