= Renewable Power Corp. =

Renewable Power Corp. is a privately owned company based in Roberts Creek, British Columbia, which was established in 2000. Peter Schober is the firm’s owner.

== Projects Built by Renewable Power Corp. ==
Renewable Power bid a project into each of BC Hydro's 2001, 2006 and 2008 Power Calls and received a Power Purchase Agreement on each occasion.

=== Operational Projects ===
Tyson Creek Hydro (9MW, 53GWh/yr)
In BC Hydro’s 2006 Open Call for Power, Renewable Power was granted a 40-year power purchase agreement for a 9MW facility at Tyson Creek. Capital costs were $40m with $34.6m of debt financing provided by CorpFinance International (which was also an equity investor). Construction began in 2007 and was completed in December 2009.
The site features a natural 875 meter drop, which will give it the highest head of any run of river plant in North America, enabling it to efficiently generate energy year round. The project’s high head allows it to operate at capacity from 70-80% of the time, versus the norm of 40- 60%. Renewable Power claims that this is the highest capacity factor (average megawatts delivered versus total ability of the plant) of any hydro project built to date.

=== Projects with Power Purchase Agreements ===
Narrows Inlet Hydro Project (45MW, 198GWh/yr)
Narrows Inlet Hydro Project (formerly Stl’ixwim project), which was awarded a Power Purchase Agreement in BC Hydro's 2008 Call for Power, is composed of three separate facilities. A 19 MW run-of-river plant at Chickwat Creek, a 7 MW plant at Upper Ramona Creek using Ramona Lake as a reservoir and a 7 MW plant at Lower Ramona Creek they are expected to start operating in the Winter of 2017. Bluearth Renewables Inc. acquired Narrows Inlet Hydro and Tyson Creek Hydro in May 2015.

== See also ==
- List of generating stations in British Columbia
- Independent power producers in British Columbia
- Small hydro
