= Small hydro =

Hydroelectric project at the local level with a few MW production

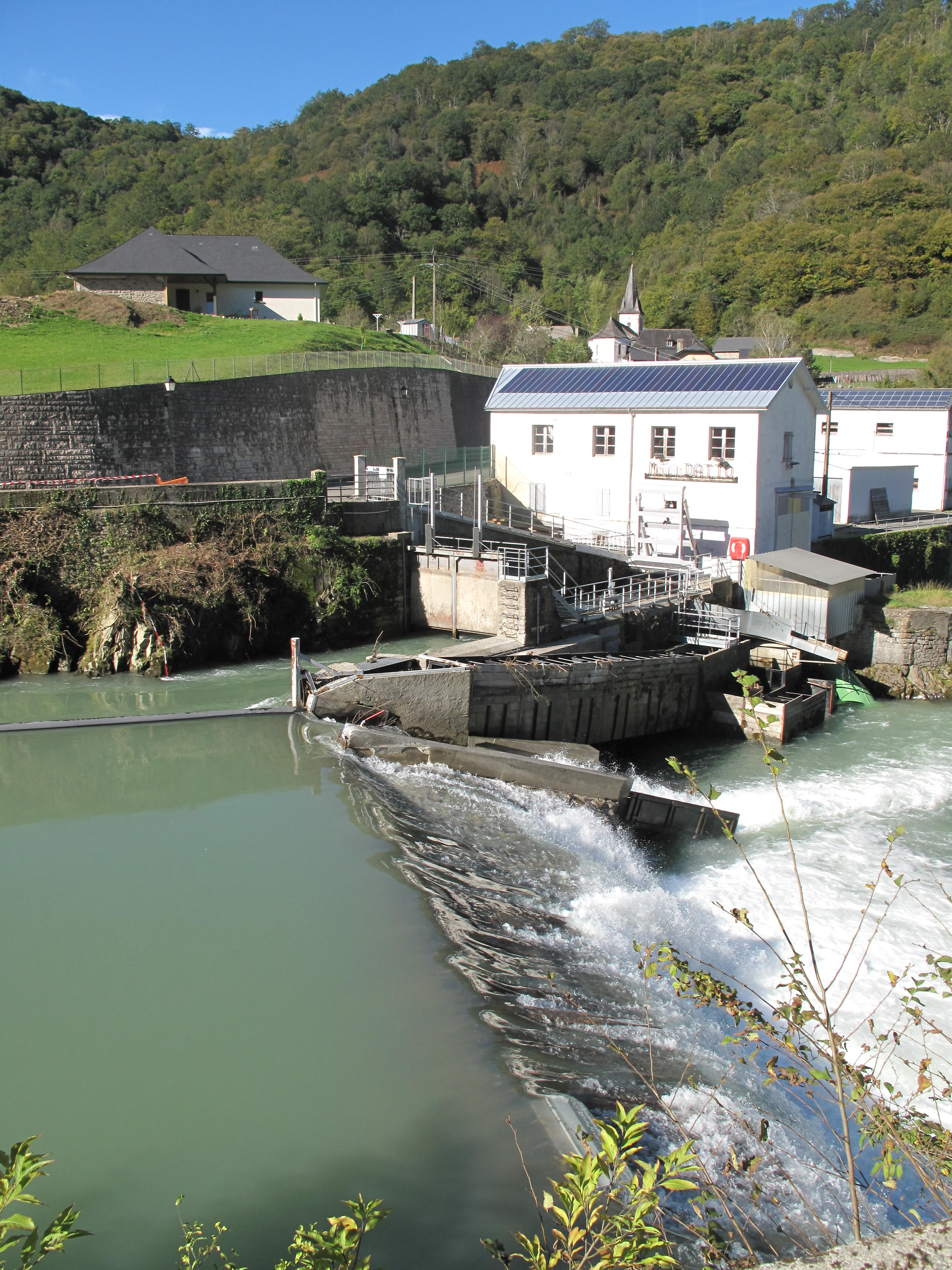
Small power plant of Licq-Athérey (Pyrénées-Atlantiques, France).

Small hydro is the generation of hydroelectric power on a smaller scale as compared to traditional large-scale hydro. Exact definitions vary by country, but small hydro power (SHP) projects are typically less than 50 megawatts (MW) and can be further subdivided by scale into "mini" (<500 kW), "micro" (<100 kW), and "pico" (<10 kW). Maximum power generation capacity is the primary factor of SHP classification. Factors like dam height, weir height, reservoir area, outlet structures and operating procedures are not standardized under this metric.

SHP projects have grown rapidly in the past two decades. Quicker permitting processes can make them easier to develop and contribute to distributed generation in a regional electricity grid. Small hydro projects may be built in isolated areas that would be uneconomic to serve from a national electricity grid, or in areas where a national grid does not exist. They produce power on a scale suitable for local community use, promoting energy independence. Rural areas face challenges in SHP integration due to an absence of political focus, accurate data, and sustainable funding.

The exact socio-environmental effects of smaller scale hydro are not yet fully understood. Many countries do not require environmental impact assessments for smaller installations.

== Description ==
The use of the term "small hydro" varies considerably around the world. In India, hydro projects with up to 25 MW capacities are categorized as Small Hydro Power (SHP) projects. In California, hydroelectric generating stations with a maximum capacity of less than 30 MW are classified as small and are eligible for inclusion in the state's renewable portfolio standard. The maximum limit is usually somewhere between 10 and 30 MW and is stretched up to 50 MW in Canada, China, Pakistan, and the United States.

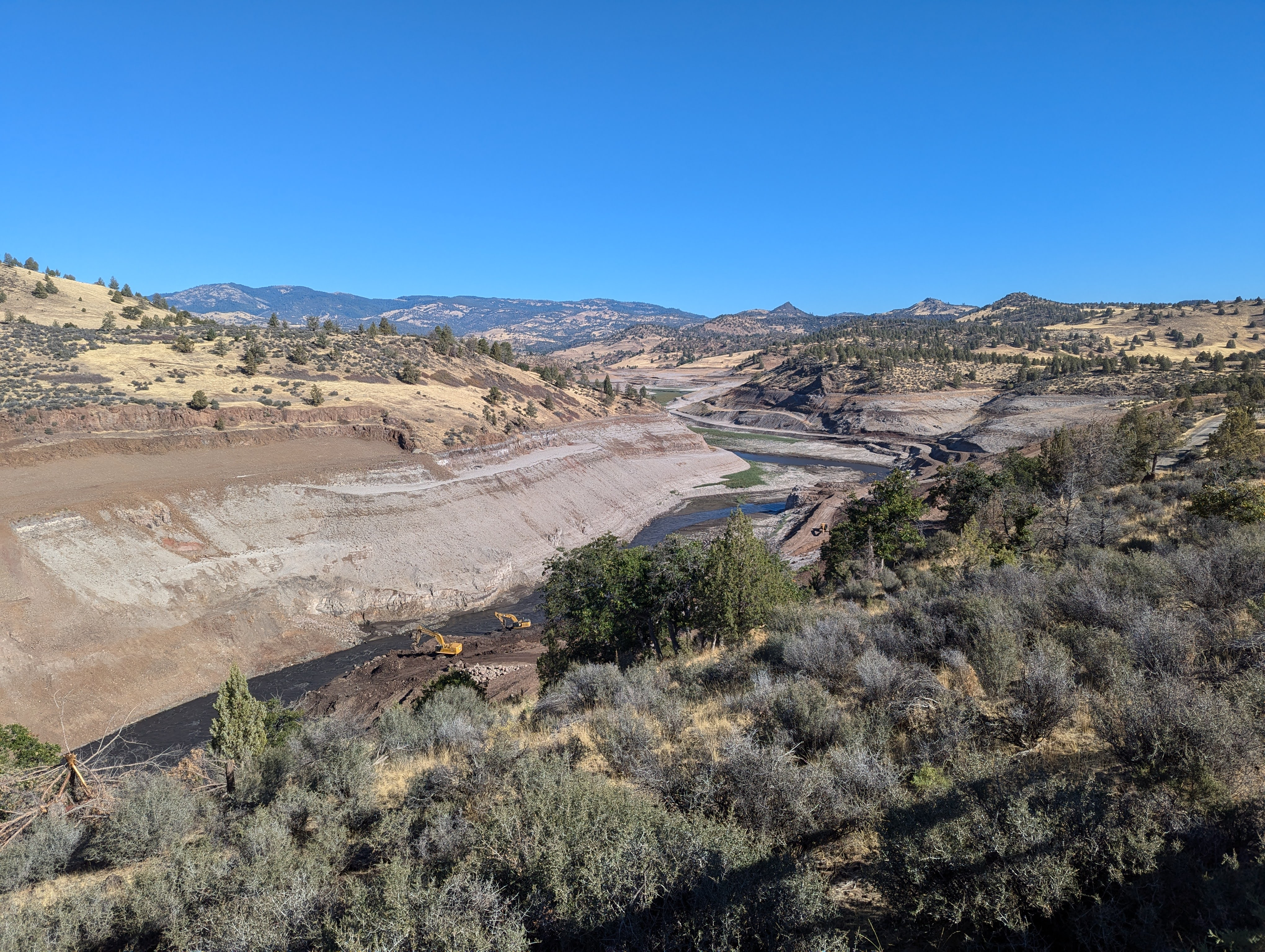
The reservoir of the Iron Gate Dam, an 18.0 MW capacity facility deconstructed in 2024.

A variety of project designs can be implemented for hydro projects with similar energy capacities. Some SHP projects utilize a run-of-river system. Others, such as the Iron Gate Dam, utilize impoundment systems which host the disadvantages associated with reservoirs. For investors, environmentalists, and policy makers small hydro projects are considered most viable when there is little ecological impact and projected profit after construction.

=== Advantages and disadvantages ===
The primary advantages of small hydro development include low costs to build and the ability to remain disconnected from centralized power grids. Contentious points within small hydropower development include issues in environmental justice, regulatory oversight, and environmental impacts.

In a number of communities which lack essential electricity access, small hydro offers a reliable source of decentralized electricity. Small hydro projects do not always require significant government assistance and gaps in governance allow them to be built fairly easily. Given these policy gaps, small hydropower as a renewable, climate mitigation strategy can also negatively affect local livelihoods in the absence of community-minded policy.

The environmental impacts of small hydropower projects are understudied. Within run-of-river design projects, the greatest harm for water systems are flow regime alteration, loss of river cohesion and connectivity, and habitat degradation affecting fish and macroinvertebrates.

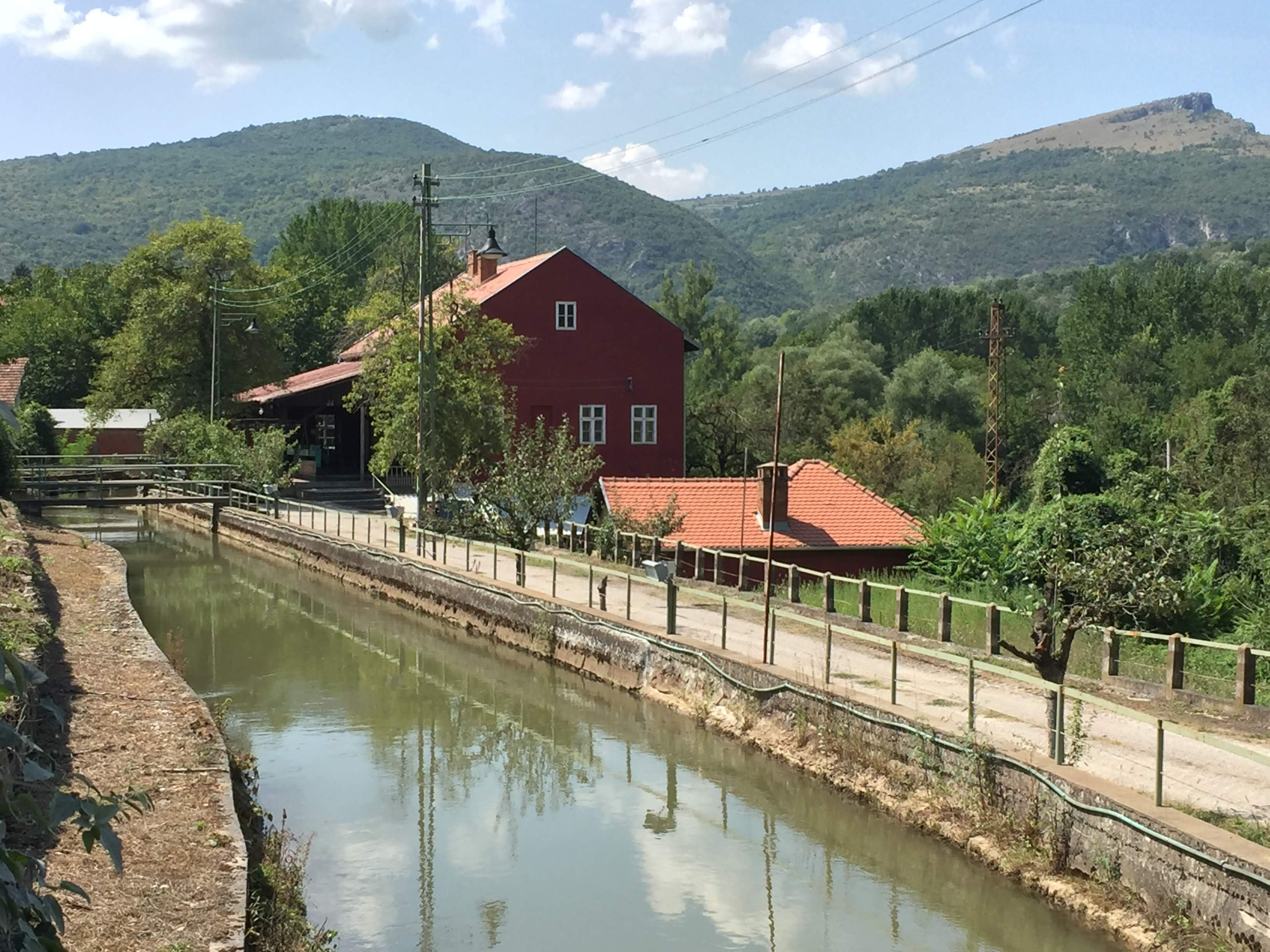
An example of a small hydro power plant, Sveta Petka.

== Growth ==
Between 2005 and 2010, China planned to electrify a further 10,000 villages under their China Village Electrification Program, including further investments in small hydro and photovoltaics. By 2010, China had 45,000 small hydro installations, especially in rural areas, producing 160 Twh annually. Over 50% of the world's potential small hydro power was found in Asia; however, a report noted that "It is possible in the future that more small hydropower potential might be identified both on the African and American continents".

In the mountains and rain forests of British Columbia, Canada there are a great many sites suitable for hydro development. However environmental concerns towards large reservoirs after the 1980s halted new dam construction. The solution to coping with increased demand was to offer contracts to independent power producers, who have built 100 run of the river projects under 50 MW. Power production without reservoirs varies dramatically, but older conventional dams retain or release water to average out production though the year. In 2014 these independent producers generated 18,000 GWh from 4,500 MW of capacity.

As of 2022, the global capacity (for projects ≤10 MW) is approximately 79.0 GW, with China holding over 53% of the world's SHP installed capacity. Under this definition (≤10 MW), installed SHP capacity increased by 11% in the Americas from 2019 to 2022. Because of local differences in SHP definitions, it is likely that the installed capacity of SHPs across the globe is higher than these totals. Countries such as China, India, and Brazil, are significantly expanding their small hydro capacity in the 21st century. The continents of Asia, Africa and the Americas hold the most potential for small hydro power growth.

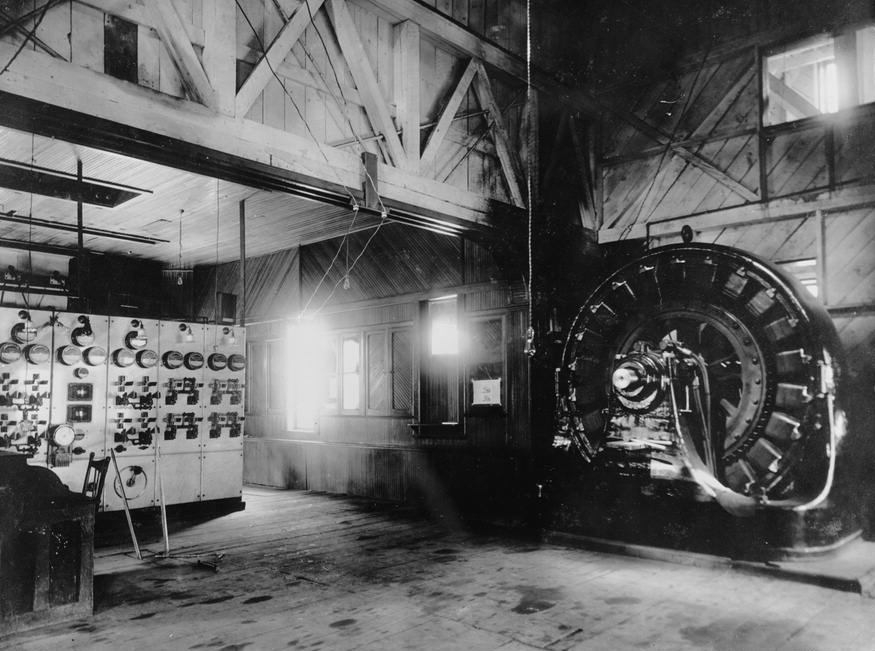
An 1895 hydroelectric plant near Telluride, Colorado.

== History ==
Wood water wheels along riversides may be considered the first examples of "small hydro". Up to the 17th century the efficiency of water wheels neared 70%. However, as the need for power generation increased small hydropower projects were phased out in favor of the large scale dams using newly designed turbines.

Post 20th century environmental doctrine is moving away from large-scale hydropower construction due to increased awareness of ecological problems associated with dams. Examples of previous dam deconstruction projects include the Restoration of the Elwha River and Un-Dam the Klamath river movement in the United States. Both of these projects deconstructed dams with generation capacities less than 30 MW.

== Generation ==
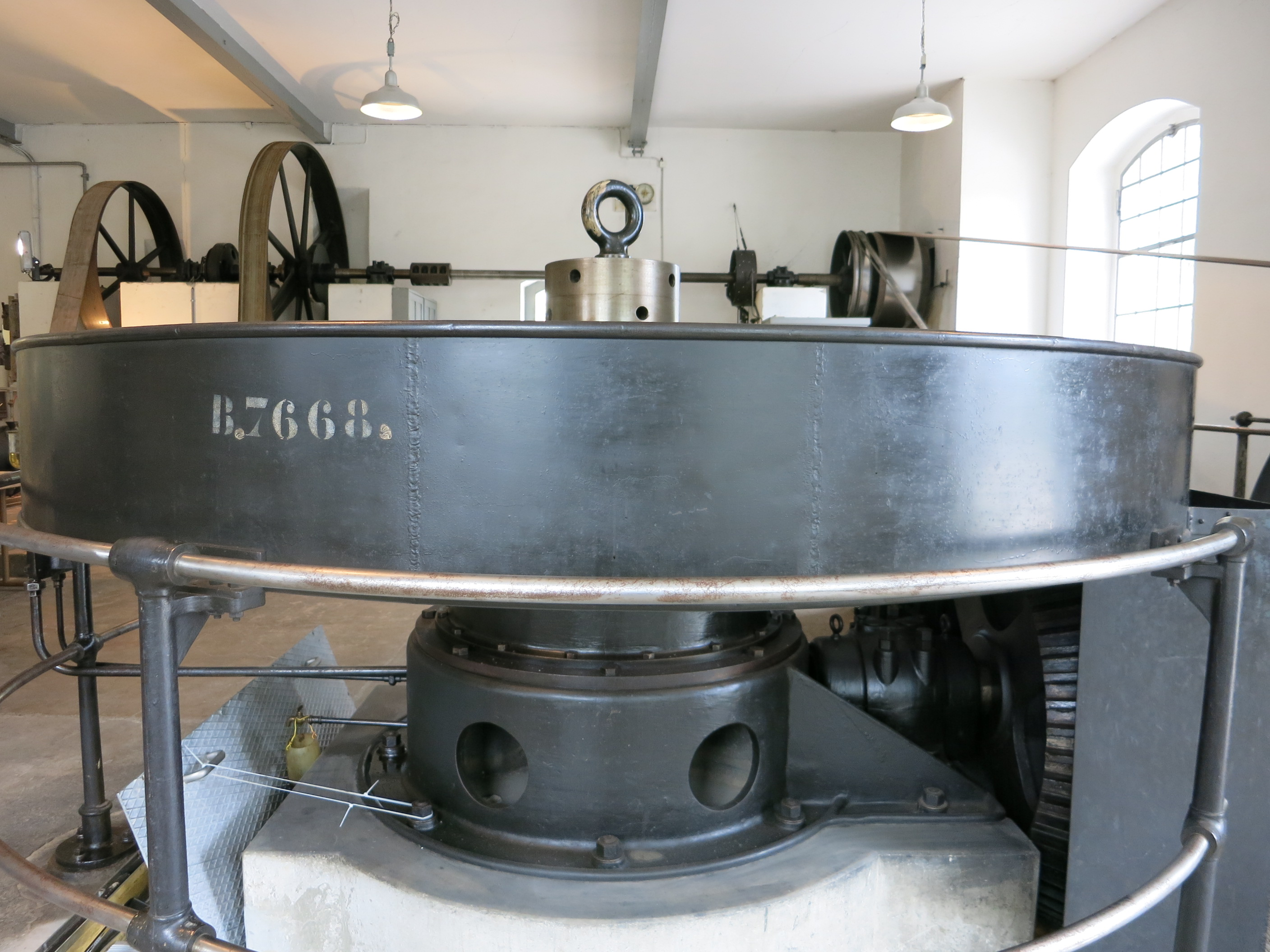
Historic Ottenbach Small Hydro with original equipment of 1920 in Ottenbach, Switzerland, still running for guided visits

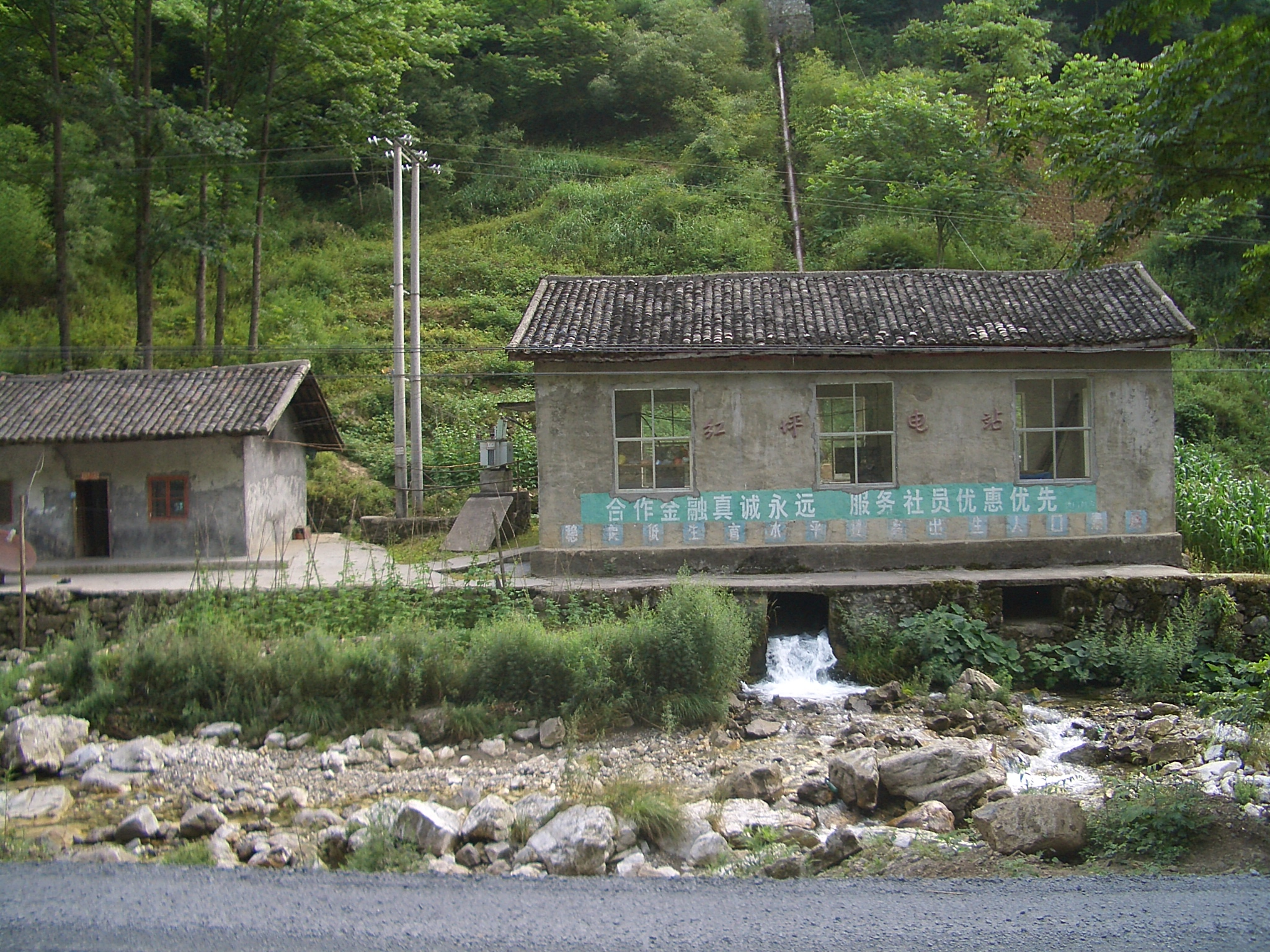
Hongping Power station, in Hongping Town, Shennongjia, has a design typical for small hydro stations in the western part of China's Hubei Province. Water comes from the mountain behind the station, through the black pipe seen in the photo

Hydroelectric power is the generation of electric power from the movement of water. A hydroelectric facility requires a dependable flow of water and a reasonable height for the water to fall, called the head. In a typical installation, water is fed from a reservoir through a pipe into a turbine. The water flowing through the turbine causes an electrical generator to rotate, converting the motion into electrical energy.

Small hydro projects may be created from the re-development of existing dams whose primary purpose is flood control or irrigation. Old hydro sites may also be re-developed with water rights re-used, salvaging substantial investment in installation technology such as penstock pipe and turbines. Either of these cost saving advantages can make the return on investment for a small hydro site well worth the use of existing sites.

Brazil is another country which is investing heavily in small hydro. Brazil itself is a leader in hydroelectric generation, the world's third most hydropower installed capacity country at 79 GW, behind the United States at 100 GW, and China in first place with 171 GW. 51 new small hydro projects are, as of 2024, being constructed in Brazil.

== Project design ==
Many companies offer standardized turbine generator packages in the approximate size range of 200 kW to 10 MW. These "water to wire" packages simplify the planning and development of the site since one vendor looks after most of the equipment supply. Because non-recurring engineering costs are minimized and development cost is spread over multiple units, the cost of such package systems is reduced. While synchronous generators capable of isolated plant operation are often used, small hydro plants connected to an electrical grid system can use economical induction generators to further reduce installation cost and simplify control and operation.

Small "run of the river" projects do not have a conventional dam with a reservoir, only a weir to form a headpond for diversion of inlet water to the turbine. Unused water simply flows over the weir and the headpond may only be capable of a single day's storage, not enough for dry summers or frozen winters when generation may come to a halt. A preferred scenario is to have the inlet in an existing lake.

Modular "micro hydrokinetic" systems have been developed for irrigation canals. "Irrigation districts across the U.S. have installed power plants at diversion points and in-canal drops, which are traditionally used for flow measurement, to stabilize upstream heads and to dissipate energy where there is significant elevation change throughout the canal system."

Countries like India and China have policies in favor of small hydro, and the regulatory process allows for building dams and reservoirs. In North America and Europe the regulatory process is too long and expensive to consider having a dam and a reservoir for a small project.

Small hydro projects usually have faster environmental and licensing procedures, and since the equipment is usually in serial production, standardized and simplified, and the civil works construction is also reduced, the projects may be developed very rapidly. The physically smaller size of equipment makes it easier to transport to remote areas without good road or rail access.

One measure of decreased environmental impact with lakes and reservoirs depends on the balance between stream flow and power production. Reducing water diversions helps the river's ecosystem, but reduces the hydro system's return on Investment (ROI). The hydro system design must strike a balance to maintain both the health of the stream and the economics.

Part of the balance between a small hydro project's return on investment and environmental concern is the proximity of the project to the national power grid. The more isolated a small hydro project is the more cost effective its construction will be.

== Policy and regulation ==
Government support of small hydro differs by country. To support renewable energy policy in Japan, the government promotes the development of community-based SHP projects with high feed-in tariffs and low interest rates for loans. In 2022, Bosnia and Herzegovina's parliament banned small hydro projects up to 10 MWh in energy generation capacity, citing environmental harm. Lack of consistency in small hydropower definitions and lack of research of socio-environmental impacts has created variance surrounding policy-making and licensing decisions. Around two-thirds of countries do not require a formal environmental licensing process to construct and operate small hydropower projects.

In India, SHPs under 25 MW do not require an Environmental Impact Assessment and instead have a Detailed Project Report (DPR). These reports provide basic information to policy and decision makers, speeding up timelines for small hydro developments. Planning and approval processes under India's DPRs do not require community engagement nor consultation.

== Energy justice ==
Many small hydro developments are made in rural or geographically isolated areas where it is expensive to connect to national power grids. For instance, rural areas in India or other countries that have flowing water regimes utilize small hydro to provide a renewable source of energy without connection to the national grid. Environmental justice of small hydro development has been most discussed in Asia and the Americas.

=== Asia ===
In mountainous regions, such as in the Indian state of Himachal Pradesh, small tributaries play an essential role in the water supply of villages, irrigating agriculture and supplying water to households. The diversion of these streams for small hydropower generation threatens water quality, irrigation supply, and local livelihoods. Local residents of Himachal Pradesh assert that benefits of local SHP projects have been exaggerated and have pushed for legal opposition to their development.

In Matsuguma Village, Japan, a 30 kW small hydropower plant was completed in 2020 under a private-public partnership. The local government approached the community explaining their goal to supply power to the regional electric grid. Community members collaborated with a business model based "by the local community and for the local community." By selling the electricity produced, community members obtained energy democracy, improved the infrastructure of the village and improved their welfare and quality of life.

=== South America ===
Because SHP projects under 20 MW are considered renewable in Chile, they are oftentimes approved without indigenous consultation, ignoring community demands for autonomy and self-determination. The Ralco Dam controversy in Chile afforded indigenous Chilean communities a governmental promise of no more mega-projects on the upper BioBío river, the second largest river in Chile. Lack of political and environmental oversight has allowed for multiple small hydropower installations to be developed in this area, contributing to further tensions in the Mapuche Conflict.

== Environmental impacts ==
Environmental effects of small hydro projects are understudied; impacts are dependent upon individual project design. Changes in the hydrologic cycles of an area can result in loss of river cohesion and connectivity, contributing to habitat degradation and loss of biodiversity for fish and macroinvertebrates. Small dams and ensuing water diversion may hinder the movement of fish as well and contribute to methane emissions from decomposed biomass.

Multiple small hydropower projects are occasionally placed segmentally on rivers, but little research has been done on the effects of multiple installations in a collective area. In India, cumulative effects of multiple SHP projects are not considered prior to granting hydropower developments. In China, researchers found the effects of river connectivity on a river with 31 small hydro projects to significantly outweigh the impacts associated with a river containing 4 larger-scale projects.

Previous studies on the sustainability of hydropower focus on greenhouse gas emission estimations, which are generally lesser than other conventional or renewable energy systems. Assessments of sustainability often do not consider additional parameters, such as environmental impacts, land use, social costs and cultural effects. With climate change threatening the reliability of seasonal river flows, the efficiency and sustainability of small hydro for energy generation is unknown.

== Sample list of small installations worldwide ==
Africa

- Zengamina, a 700 kW plant in Kalene Hill, Mwinilunga District in northwestern Zambia. 2008

Asia

- Meenvallam Small Hydroelectric Project, Palakkad district, Kerala, India.
- Bario Asal & Arur Layun Micro-Hydro Community Project, Kelabit Highlands, Sarawak, Malaysia. 2009
- Ambangal Mini Hydro Electric Power Plant, Kiangan, Ifugao, Philippines (2010)
- Asiga River Mini Hydro Electric Power Plant, Santiago, Agusan del Norte, Philippines (2019)
- Balongbong Mini Hydro Electric Power Plant, Bato, Catanduanes, Philippines (1983)
- Cantingas Mini Hydro Electric Power Plant, San Fernando, Romblon, Philippines (2009)
- Likud Mini Hydro Electric Power Plant, Asipulo and Kiangan, Ifugao, Philippines (2015)
- New Bataan Hydro Electric Power Plant, New Bataan, Davao de Oro, Philippines (2018)
- San Luis Mini Hydro Electric Power Plant, San Luis, Aurora, Philippines (2011)
- Villasiga Mini Hydro Electric Power Plant, Bugasong, Antique, Philippines (2016)
- Pakpattan Hydro Power Project, a 2.82 MW plant on Pakpattan Canal in Pakpattan District, Pakistan 2015

Europe

- Green Valleys Project, Brecon Beacons National Park, Wales. Joint winner of £300K in Big Green Challenge 2009.
- St Catherine's, a National Trust site near Windermere, Westmorland, United Kingdom.

North America

- Ames Hydroelectric Generating Plant, Colorado, United States. On the List of IEEE Milestones
- Childs-Irving Hydroelectric Facilities, Arizona, United States. 1916 Now decommissioned
- Snoqualmie Falls, Washington, United States. 1957
- Malibu Hydro, British Columbia, Canada. 2005
- Menihek Hydroelectric Generating Station, Newfoundland and Labrador, Canada. 1954
- Cloudworks Energy is one of many Independent power producers that have built projects in British Columbia, Canada

== See also ==
- Electricity generation
- Hydro power
- Low head hydro power
- Micro hydro up to 100 kW
- Pico hydro up to 5 kW
- Conduit hydroelectricity
- International Center on Small Hydro Power
