= Independent power producers in British Columbia =

Independent power producer (IPP) projects have had a significant presence in British Columbia since the 1980s. Their relationship with BC Hydro grew from the province's need to supply growing energy demands and implementation of the 2002 Energy Strategy, which mandated that BC Hydro would purchase its energy supply from IPPs rather than generating the supply itself. There are a variety of power projects in BC, with the most popular being hydroelectricity and biomass projects. In recent years, more attention has been placed on the environmental effects of IPP projects and the social implications it has to residents living around the project development sites. Despite the decline in demand for new IPP projects, in 2016 they supplied 20,000 GWh, one-third of BC Hydro's total.

== History ==
Starting in the 1980s, independent power producer projects became popular in British Columbia due to growing demands for energy that could no longer be supported by BC Hydro alone. In 1983 the BC Utilities Commission turned down the application to build a third Peace River dam, criticizing BC Hydro's unreliable forecasts for future electricity demand. New provincial regulations addressed the issue of how to manage the energy budget and recommended the creation of new programs to help supply the domestic demand. The success of these programs lead to a revamped energy strategy in 2002, outlined under the new BC Energy Plan, which legislated that BC Hydro would no longer make its own energy-generating capacity, and instead purchase power directly from IPPs. This led to a boom in the distribution of IPP licenses and rapid growth of new energy-harvesting projects, along with expansion of existing projects to rural regions. In 2006, BC Hydro entered a long-term electricity purchase agreement with large-scale and small-scale IPP projects, which requires that the project developers sell all energy generated from the project to BC Hydro for a term of 20 to 40 years starting on the commercial operation date. In 2009 there were 46 projects in operation and an additional 38 proposed or under construction projects that have agreements with BC Hydro.

In 2007, the new energy plan mandated that at least 90 per cent of all electricity generated in BC must originate from clean, sustainable sources. This bill, often termed as the "Clean Power Call," lead to a marked reduction of diesel generating projects, and contributed to the dominance of wind turbine and run-of-the-river projects, which left much smaller impacts on the environment. With the loss of previous producers of energy, a second call for power was announced and new contracts were created to restore the amount of energy available. Despite the growing popularity, there has been a reduction in the need for IPPs, as a result of the province's mandate to reduce BC Hydro's utility cost on consumers. Since 2013, there have been several cuts in contracts and IPP development has slowed substantially. In 2014 BC sold 7400 MWh to the US and ended the year with net imports of 2300 MWh, the largest in Canada.

In 2017 BC Hydro reaffirmed that it would only construct and maintain large hydro, other energy projects are to be done with IPP's. In BC Hydro's submissions to the BCUC they stated that new storage, wind and geothermal IPP projects could substitute for cancelling the Site C dam. These additional plants would not be owned by BC Hydro, electricity production facilities are privately owned by the IPP.

== Types of IPPs in BC ==
There have been several reasons discussed for the preference of these small projects, such as private financing, less government bureaucracy and generation methods other than hydro. In BC specifically, these projects gained favour after the passing of the 2007 Energy Plan.

=== Run-of-river projects ===
Example of a Run-of-River facility:Toba Montrose, supplying 235 MW of power to BC Hydro

The dominant type of IPPs in British Columbia are run-of-the-river, or small hydro, projects. In 2016, there were 114 IPP projects of all types, annually generating 20,000 gigawatt hours of electricity from 4800 megawatts of capacity. Some ecological concerns have been raised over rural areas that may have remained untouched by ranching, logging and mining, now being developed with roads and transmission lines.

=== Biomass energy ===
Several Biomass energy projects have been implemented and more are being researched in BC. By 2015 biomass made up about 5% of BCs electricity production. There is a considerable amount of woody biomass from lumber mills, roadside debris, and standing pine which have the potential to generate 2,300 megawatts of electricity.

=== Wind turbine projects ===
Four wind turbine projects were built between 2009 and 2014 in British Columbia and supply almost 2 percent of the province’s electricity. A prominent producer of this form of energy is Cape Scott Wind Farm, located in Port Hardy, British Columbia, which supplies 2 percent of the province's overall energy supply. Although a clean source of energy, issues have arisen over the inconsistency of the energy generated and overall appearance of the turbines. Since wind forces vary from time to time, the amount of electricity generated can be inconsistent and therefore unreliable. BC Hydro has shown little interest in this type of producer for this reason. Other critics worry that the aesthetic appearance may be unsightly and deter potential landowners. Supporters of wind energy advocate for wind turbine construction on BC's north coast and Peace River regions, which have been shown to receive constant winds throughout the year.

=== Other projects ===
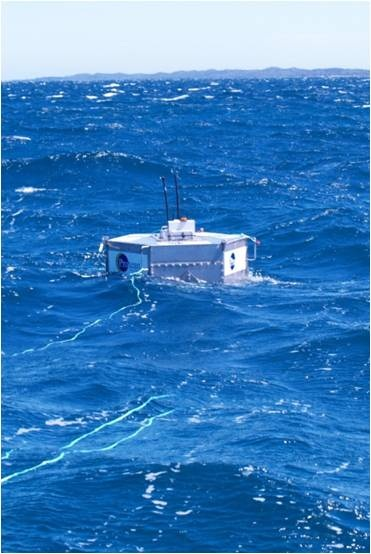
Example of Ocean Energy: Protean Energy Wave Energy Converter prototype trial being conducted in the ocean off the coast of Western Australia in 2008

There is interest in other types of IPP projects and though less recognized in BC, several are gaining popularity.

Ocean wave energy is being proposed as the better alternative to run-of-the-river hydroelectricity for their reliability and sustainability. However, the impact of such projects on fish habitats and marine environments along BC's coast are of concern, and little research is being conducted due to the extremely high costs of implementation.

Geothermal projects are another area of interest for development in BC. These offer a stable source of massive energy with relatively minimal impact on the environment. The fuel source is generated by natural steam or hot water, which gives off almost no air emissions. In BC, a project north of Pemberton is undergoing prospective development. Although geothermal energy is abundant, it is location-specific and only renewable when reservoirs are managed properly. In extremely rare cases, these projects have been known to contribute to earthquakes.

Solar power only has one commercial development even though it has a great deal of public support and fits in well with hydroelectric storage, it is less well supported by the wet northern climate in BC. For regions with similar climate like the UK, solar actually produces electricity 11% of the time.

== Future of IPPs in BC ==
=== Project developments ===
IPPs can be developed by anyone in the private or public sector. Since the implementation of the 2002 Energy Plan, however, BC Hydro will no longer be authorized to develop its own public IPPs, leaving future projects to be developed by the private sector. The province of British Columbia currently buys from several sources such as Rio Tinto Alcan, Teck Cominco, pulp mills, Columbia Power Corporation, Alberta, and the United States.

As of April 2017 BC Hydro was purchasing electricity under contract with private companies which deliver 20,788 gigawatts of power annually. The 2002 policy allows for new projects to be produced at lower costs and spares public expenditure by shifting the financial responsibilities to those operating in the private sector, rather than BC Hydro. Despite these advantages, some argue that this policy does not allow for accountability and transparency of the IPP projects under private ownership. Once the contracts with BC Hydro expire, privately owned IPPs wills be allowed free export of electricity, which in turn would negatively impact BC's electricity supply.

=== Community concerns ===
IPP projects may breach on Aboriginal lands and cause tension in the community. There is a need to consult with Aboriginal groups and discuss regulations in regards to where IPP projects will be established, how they will be managed, and the monetary rights, prior to implementation. Another concern pertains to the ecological impact of installing IPPs throughout the province. Although IPPs produce clean energy, the means of establishing these power projects may not necessarily be environmentally friendly. Construction of infrastructures, such as roads and transmission lines, may negatively impact the surrounding natural environment and wild fish habitats and bird populations.

=== Future projects ===
BC Hydro predicts that the province will need more electricity in the next 20 years as a result of BC's growing population and increasing use of technologies that require more electrical power, such as heat pumps and electric cars. There is concern for whether this prediction holds credibility, as there are currently few research studies conducted on the increasing need for electricity. Electricity conservation measures need to be conducted in order to provide an adequate indicator for BC's electricity demand. Public opinion will become more important as the provincial government begins to make decisions regarding the future of these projects and assessments on where new IPPs should be located in the province.

In the 2017 BC Utilities Commission final report on the question of whether to continue or cancel the Site C Dam, BC Hydro indicated that if Site C was cancelled and replaced with wind turbines, the project would be done by IPP's.

=== Individual projects ===
- Renewable Power Corp. - Narrows Inlet Hydro Project, Tyson Creek Hydro, McNair Creek Hydro
- Island Generating Station - Natural gas - Campbell River
- Veresen - Furry Creek hydro, upper and lower Clowhom hydro, Culliton Creek Hydro
- Cloudworks Energy - In 2011 Innergex Renewable Energy acquired Cloudworks Energy
- Innergex Renewable Energy - Ashlu Creek, Brown Lake, Douglas Creek, Fire Creek, Fitzsimmons Creek, Lamont Creek, Miller Creek, Rutherford Creek, Stokke Creek, Tipella Creek, Upper Stave River
- Alterra Power - Toba Montrose, Dokie wind near Chetwynd
- TransAlta - Upper Mamquam, Bone Creek, Akolkolex
- AltaGas Ltd. - Volcano Creek Hydro, McLymont Creek Hydro, Forrest Kerr Hydro, Bear Mountain Wind Park Near Dawson Creek
- Tla-o-qui-aht First Nations - Canoe Creek Hydro, Haa-ak-suuk Creek Hydro
- Malibu Hydro - Private hydro for the Malibu Club, near the shore of Jervis Inlet
- Watson Lake Solar Project, Yukon - 4.4Kw Solar PV - 11% capacity factor
- SunMine Solar In Kimberley. BC is a $5.3 million dollar project, with a 1.05 MW Solar PV system generating 3,500 MWh annually. It is contracted to sell power to BC Hydro at $110.10 per megawatt hour, and was operational in July 2015.

== See also ==
- List of generating stations in British Columbia
- Small hydro
