= International Center on Small Hydro Power =

Organization that promotes development of small hydro power

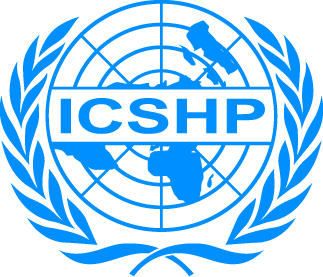
- Abbreviation: ICSHP
- Formation: 1994
- Legal status: active
- Headquarters: Hangzhou, China
- Head: Prof. Liu Heng
- Website: www.icshp.org

The International Center on Small Hydro Power (ICSHP) is a non-profit institution operating under the auspices of the United Nations Industrial Development Organization (UNIDO) to promote the development of small hydro power. The ICSHP is also the headquarters of the International Network on Small Hydro Power (INSHP).

== Formation ==
The ICSHP was formed in 1994 by the United Nations Development Program (UNDP) and the United Nations Industrial Development Organization (UNIDO) in co-operation with the Chinese Ministry of Water Resources and the Chinese Ministry of Commerce. Following approval from the State Council of the People's Republic of China in 1999 the ICSHP became the first international institution to be established in China. The following year an official agreement between the Chinese government brought the ICSHP directly under the auspices of UNIDO. Its establishment has been described as 'one of the major achievements of China's reform and a symbol of world SHP demand, which reflects the international status of China's SHP development'

== Mission ==
The ICSHP was established 'to promote small hydropower development worldwide'. It has a specific focus on developing countries, south-south co-operation and the promotion of small hydro power for 'the social, economic and environmental development of rural areas'. The organisation provides training, advice, research and information exchange on small hydro power development and management. The mission of the ICSHP is also in keeping with UNIDO's focus on promoting South-South Co-operation, 'by encouraging more horizontal investment flows'.

== World Small Hydro Power Development Report ==
In 2013 the ICSHP and UNIDO published the World Small Hydro Power Development Report. According to Li Yong, Director-General of UNIDO, the report was "a world first compilation of global small hydropower data". The report assessed small hydro power development in 149 countries across 20 regions from over 60 different authors. It found that while installed small hydro power was estimated at 75 GW, potential small hydro power was approximately 173 GW. Over 50% of the world's potential small hydro power was found to be in Asia however the report noted "It is possible in the future that more small hydropower potential might be identified both on the African and American continents". In 2015 it was announced that a second, updated edition of the report would be published in 2016.

== Headquarters ==
The ICSHP is based in Hangzhou, China with additional bases in Hunan and Gansu provinces and sub-bases in India, Nigeria and Colombia
