= Dokie Ridge Wind Farm =

Wind farm in British Columbia, Canada

Coordinates: 55.8031°N 122.2658°W

The Dokie Ridge Wind Farm is a wind farm located near Chetwynd, British Columbia, Canada (about 1,100 km northeast of Vancouver). It was put into commercial operation in 2011. The facility has a generating capacity of 144 megawatts and it produces 320 to 340 gigawatt-hours of energy per year. Electrical engineering consulting services are provided by Lex Engineering Ltd. BC Hydro announced the project was in commercial operation as of February 16, 2011. The project was built in partnership between GE and Plutonic Power Corporation (now Alterra Power Corp.). The wind farm has 48 Vestas V90 3 MW turbines, an electrical substation and seven kilometers of transmission line. The project cost about $228 million (Canadian).

== See also ==
- List of wind farms in Canada
- List of generating stations in British Columbia
- Independent power producers in British Columbia
