= Soo River =

Tributary of the Green River in British Columbia, Canada

Coordinates: 50°16′00″N 122°52′00″W

The Soo River is a tributary of the Green River in the Pacific Ranges of the Coast Mountains in British Columbia, Canada, joining that river just north of the Resort Municipality of Whistler. Approximately 35 kilometres (22 mi) long, it begins on the south flank of the Pemberton Icefield. Its course is generally eastward from there to the Green River valley, although upon reaching that valley it runs north for about 3.5 kilometres (2.2 mi) roughly parallel to the Green before joining it. For much of its course, known as the Soo Valley, it forms a serpentine marshland until reaching a short canyon before entering the valley of the Green River.

Heavily logged over the years, the valley is accessible by rough dirt road. It is a popular cross-country skiing area in winter, partly because its middle reaches are accessible via trails from the Emerald Estates neighbourhood of Whistler. The uppermost part of the Soo Valley features various volcanic formations.

The name "Soo Valley" was used for the skier–hippie group squat at an old lumbering camp-cum-ghost town on Green Lake, famous for a 1970s-vintage group nude photo of its inhabitants, many members of Whistler's established business community today.

== See also ==
- List of rivers of British Columbia
- Rutherford Creek
