= Pemberton Icefield =

Icefield in British Columbia, Canada

Coordinates: 50°22′00″N 123°22′00″W

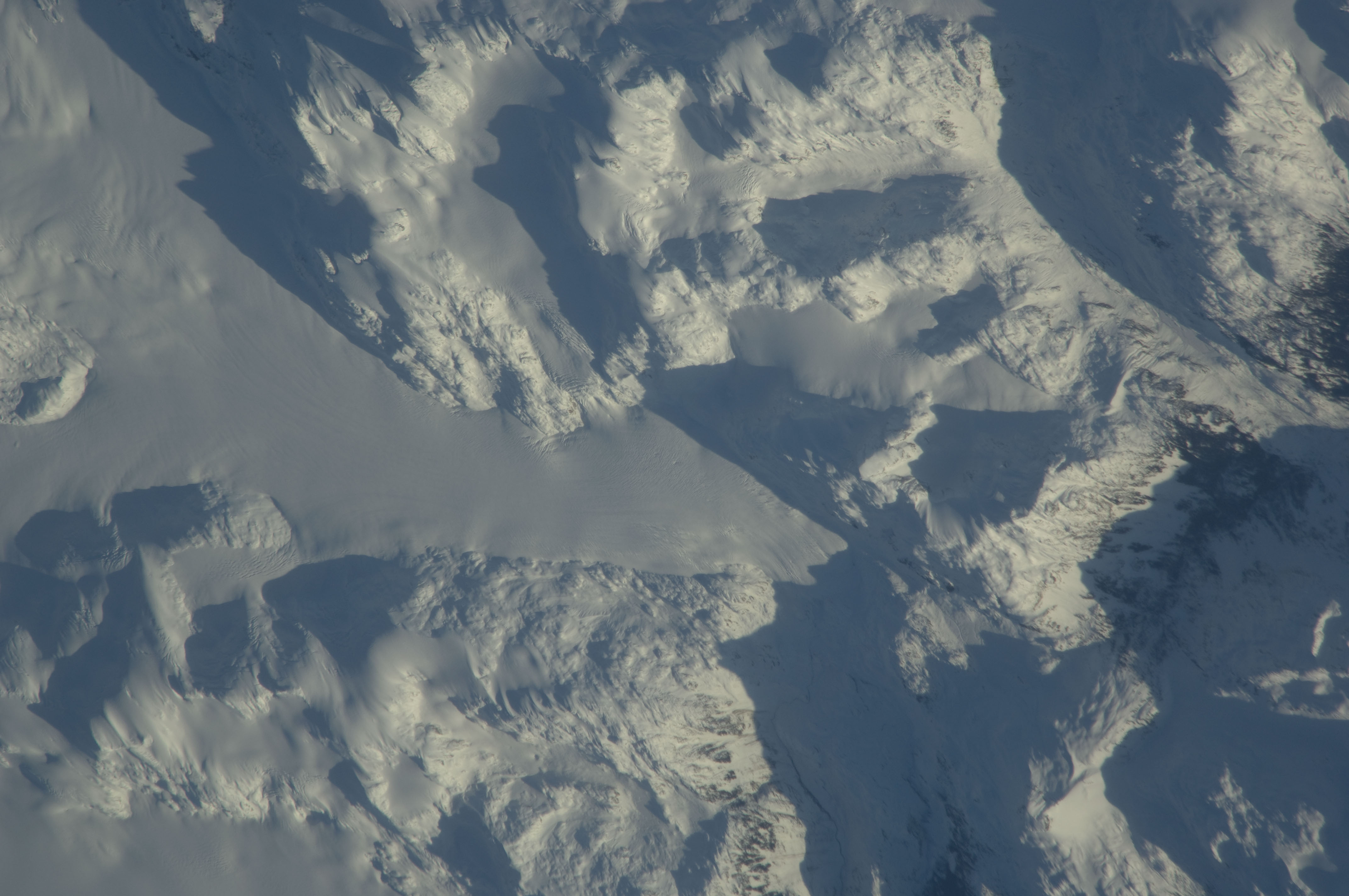
Pemberton Icefields as seen from the ISS.

The Pemberton Icefield, or Pemberton Icecap, is the southernmost of a series of very large icefields studding the Pacific Ranges of the southern Coast Mountains in British Columbia, Canada.

== Physical details ==
Approximately 300 km^{2} (120 sq mi) in area, the icefield's shape is roughly triangular, with an apex on its northern side, where a short gap separates the ice-mass from that of the smaller Overseer Icefield. Some reckonings include the icemasses of the Overseer massif, in which case the Pemberton Icefield's area may be considered to be ~60 km^{2} (23 sq mi) larger in area.

Overseer Mountain is the highest summit in the region lying in the triangle between the basins of the Lillooet, Squamish-Elaho and Cheakamus-Green valleys, although the highest named summit in the Pemberton Icefield proper is Longspur Peak, on the main icefield's northwest flank above the Ryan River, although a higher, unnamed summit lies in between them, at the northernmost edge of the icefield. Just east of Longspur are Kwtamts Peak and Sisqa Peak (names from St'at'imcets language of Lil'wat people, whose traditional territory includes the eastern reaches and related valleys of the icefield). The southernmost summit of the icefield is Exodus Peak, which lies in the angle between the uppermost reaches of the Squamish River and the valley of the Elaho River, a tributary of the Squamish.

=== Streams ===
Streams having their origin in the icecap include the Squamish River and Soo River on its southern edge, Rutherford Creek of its eastern point, the Ryan River off its northeast side, and tributary streams to the Elaho River, a tributary of the Squamish, on the west, and the south fork of Meager Creek, on its north side, another tributary of the Lillooet. Other smaller icefields nearby are the Ipsoot Glacier (also known as the Ipsoot Icefield) to the east, on the north side of Rutherford Creek, and the Powder Mountain Icefield to the south, beyond the divide separating the headwaters of the Squamish and Soo Rivers.

== Popular use ==
Nearby the Resort Municipality of Whistler, the icefield is popular with back-country skiers heli-skiing operations, summer heli-hiking, and onscreen entertainment. Pemberton stands in for Antarctica or the Arctic in films and TV, including the X-Files movie and Stargate: SG-1, "Solitudes" episode, and Stargate: Atlantis long-running Stargate set of series.
