= Ipsoot Mountain =

Glaciated summit in southwest British Columbia, Canada

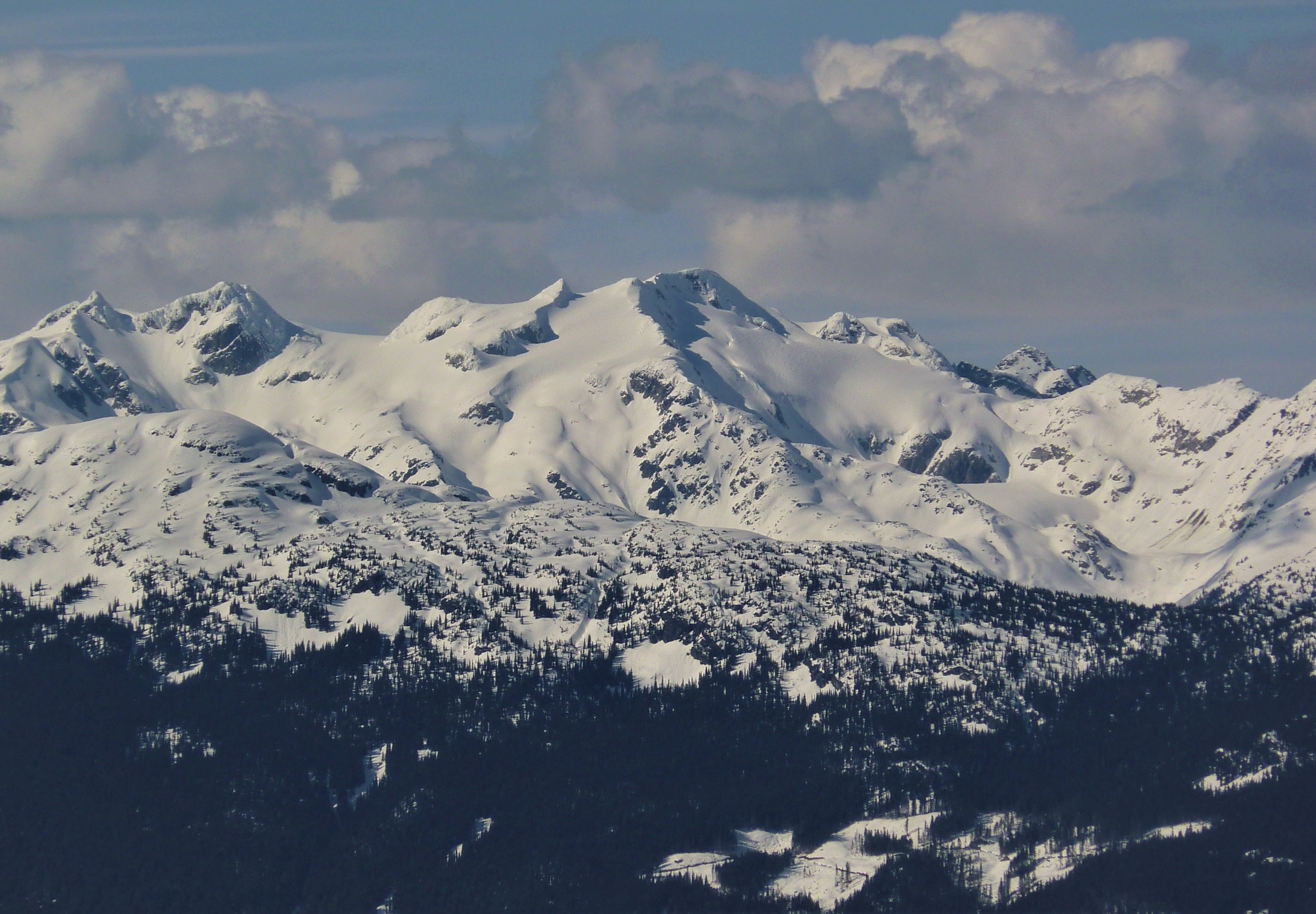
- South aspect, viewed from Whistler Mountain

Highest point
- Elevation: 2,576 m (8,451 ft)
- Prominence: 958 m (3,143 ft)
- Parent peak: Overseer Mountain (2,749 m)
- Isolation: 17.2 km (10.7 mi)
- Listing: Mountains of British Columbia
- Coordinates: 50°19′32″N 122°59′30″W

Geography
- Location within British Columbia Location within Canada
- Interactive map of Ipsoot Mountain
- Location: British Columbia, Canada
- District: Lillooet Land District
- Parent range: Coast Mountains
- Topo map: NTS 92J7 Pemberton

Climbing
- First ascent: L. Harrison, J. Booth, R. Pilkington, T. Fallowfield, W. Cadillac, A. Dellow

Ipsoot Mountain is a 2,576-metre (8,451-foot) glaciated summit located in southwest British Columbia, Canada.

== Description ==
Ipsoot Mountain is situated in the Coast Mountains, 13 km (8 mi) west of Pemberton and 22 km (14 mi) north of Whistler. Precipitation runoff and glacial meltwater from this large mountain drains into Pemberton, Miller and Rutherford creeks, then eventually Lillooet River. Ipsoot is more notable for its steep rise above local terrain than for its absolute elevation as topographic relief is significant with the summit rising over 1,800 meters (5,900 ft) above Rutherford Creek in approximately 4 km (2.5 mi). The mountain was named by the first ascent party, and "ipsoot" means "hidden", or "to hide" in Chinook Jargon, as this peak is indeed hidden from view in adjacent valleys. The toponym was officially adopted June 22, 1967, by the Geographical Names Board of Canada.

== Climate ==
Based on the Köppen climate classification, Ipsoot Mountain is located in the marine west coast climate zone of western North America. Most weather fronts originate in the Pacific Ocean, and travel east toward the Coast Mountains where they are forced upward by the range (Orographic lift), causing them to drop their moisture in the form of rain or snowfall. As a result, the Coast Mountains experience high precipitation, especially during the winter months in the form of snowfall. Winter temperatures can drop below −20 °C with wind chill factors below −30 °C. This climate supports the Ipsoot Glacier (also known as the Ipsoot Icefield) on the peak's northwest slope. The months July through September offer the most favorable weather for climbing Ipsoot Mountain.

== See also ==
- Geography of British Columbia
- Geology of British Columbia

== Gallery ==
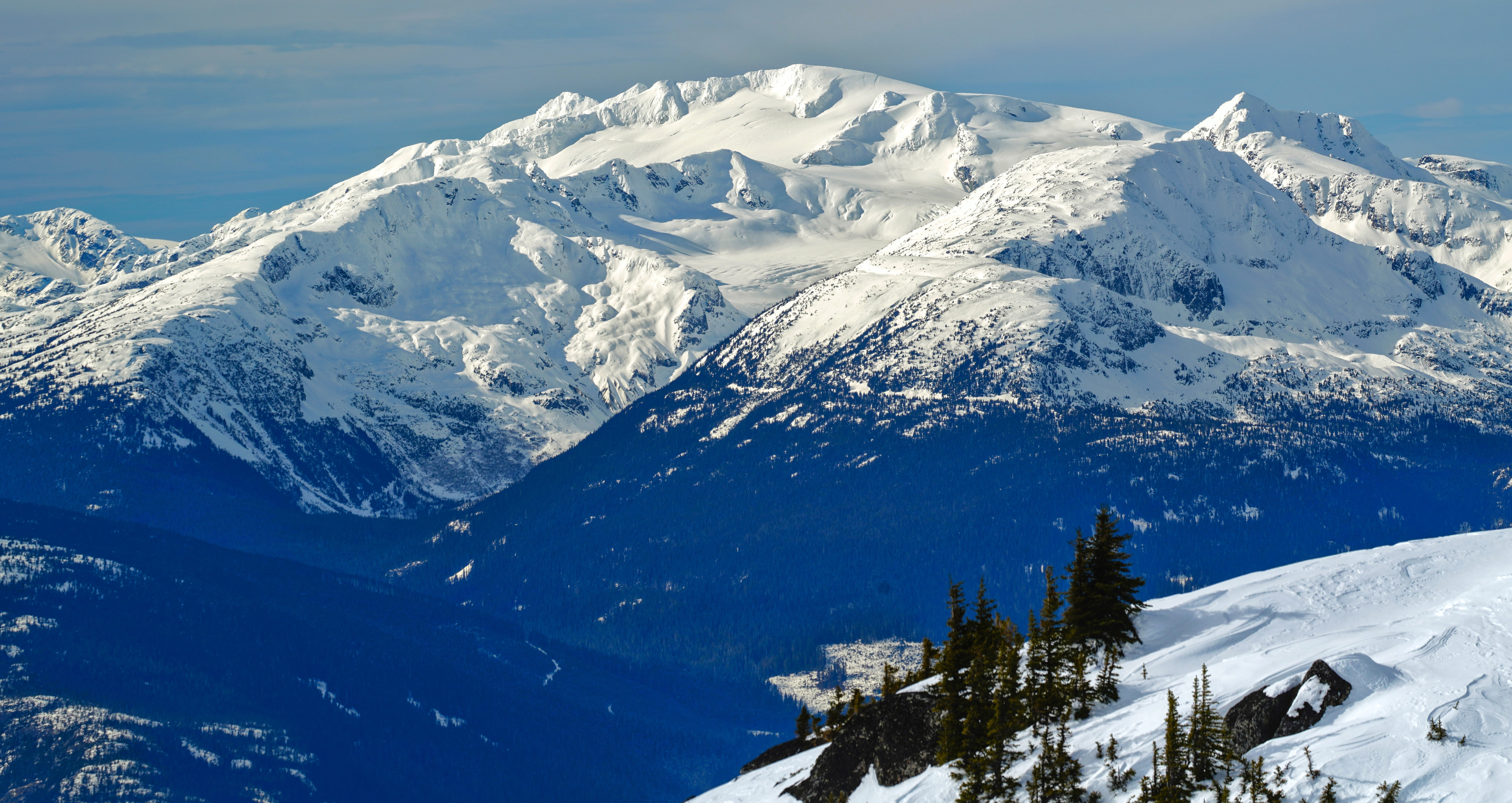
East aspect, viewed from Mt. Taylor

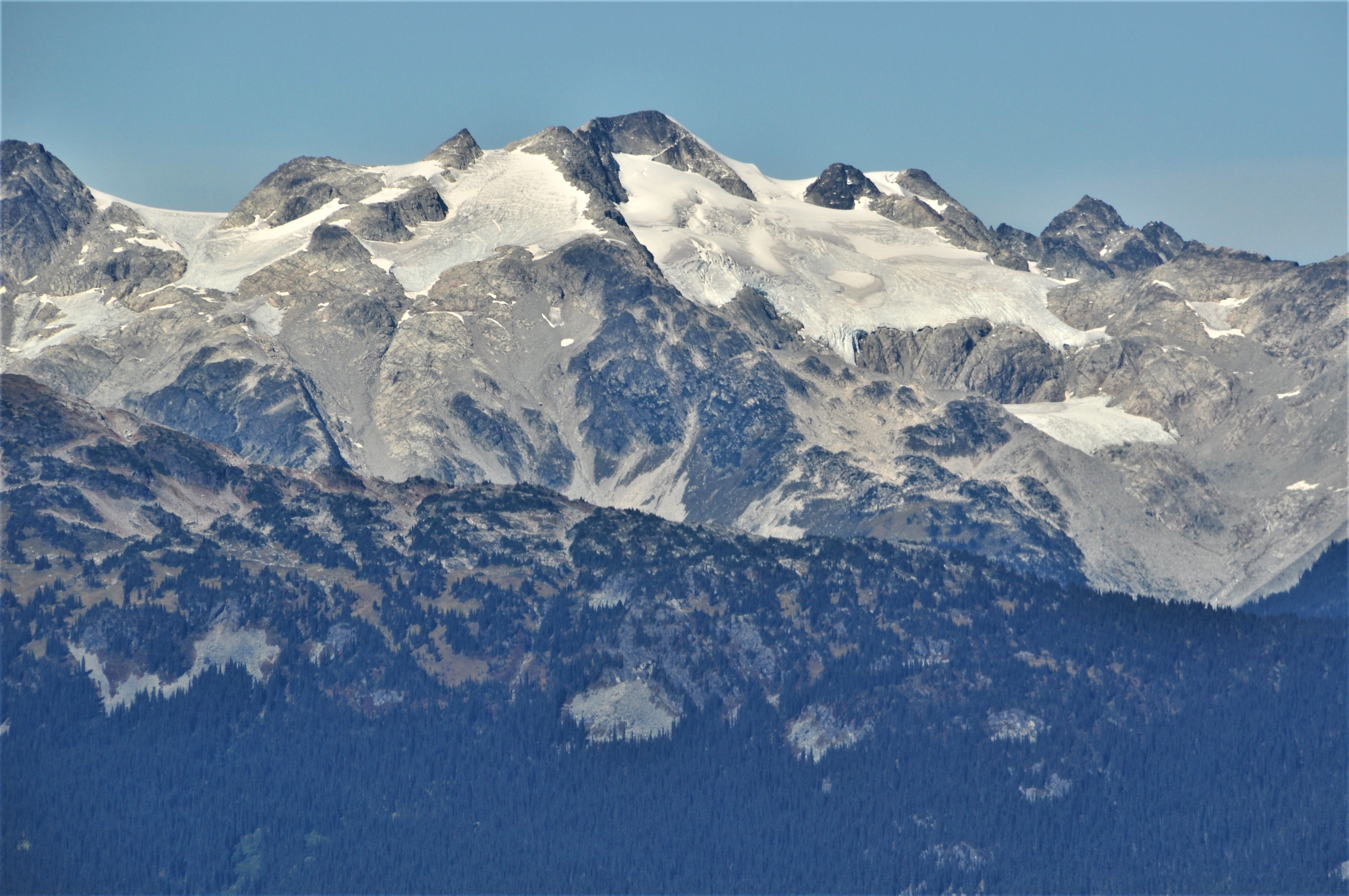
South aspect of Ipsoot Mountain viewed from Whistler Mountain

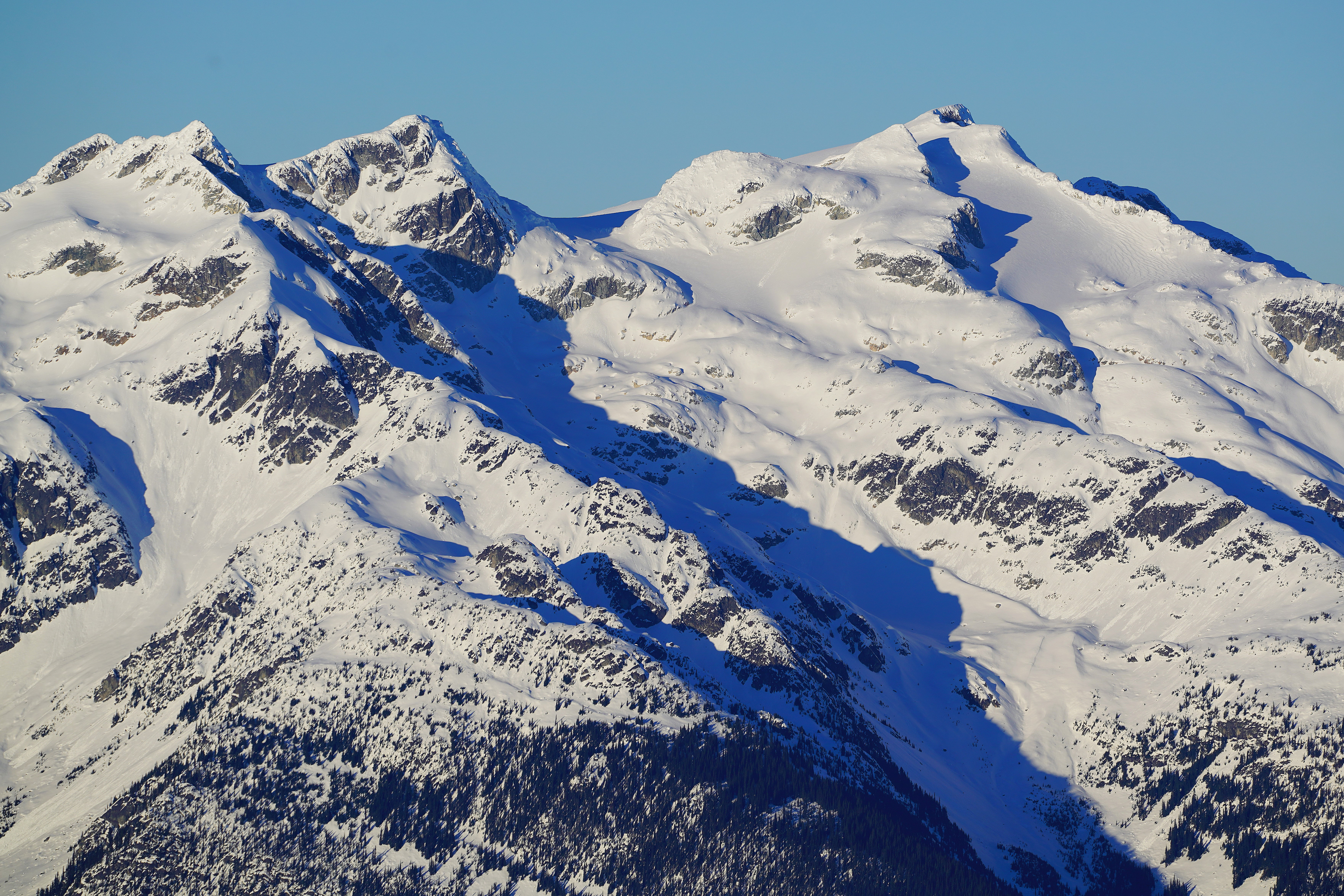
South aspect, viewed from Rainbow Mountain in winter

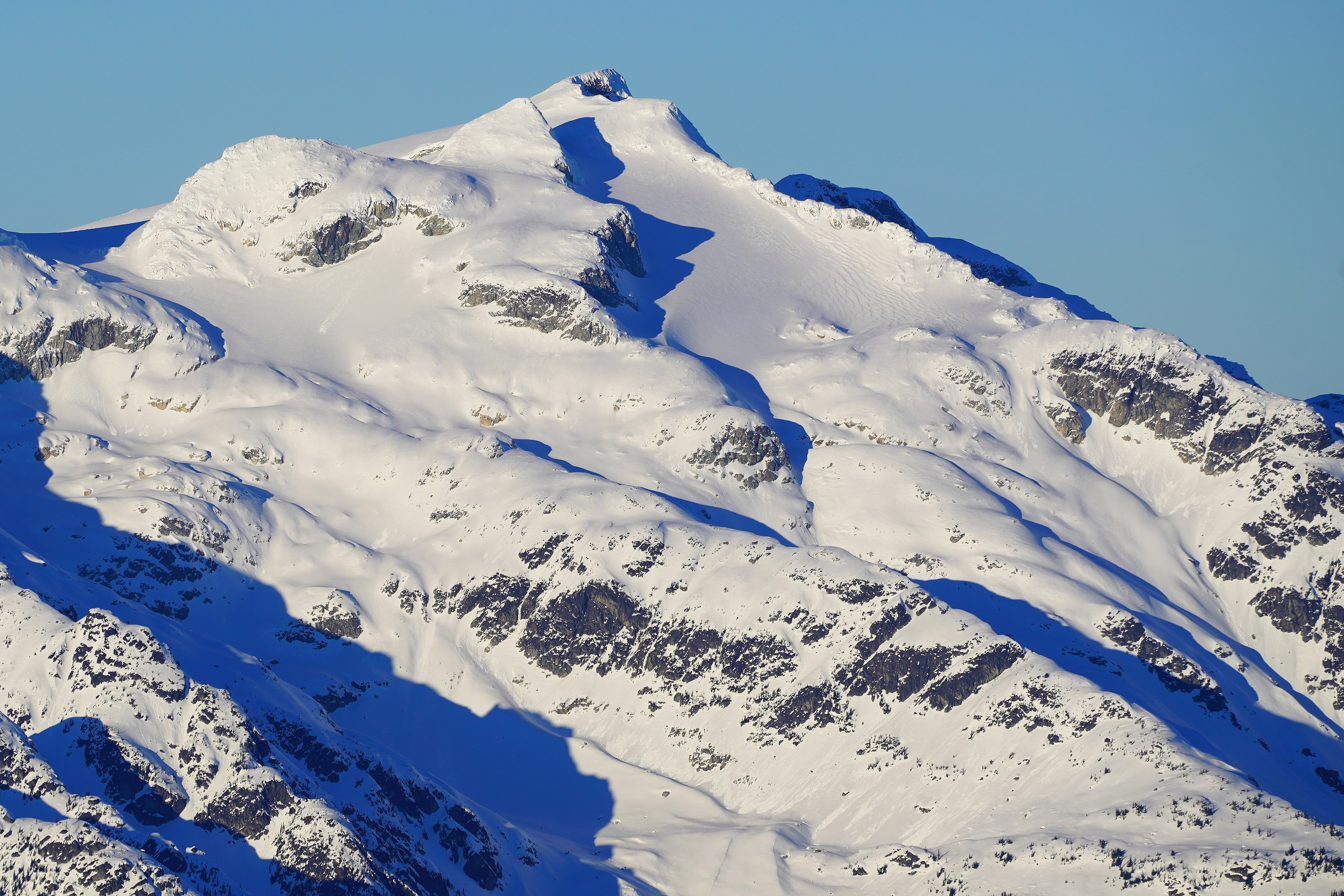
South aspect, viewed from Rainbow Mountain
