= Cloudworks Energy =

Cloudworks Energy Inc. was a private, Vancouver-based run-of-river hydro developer formed in 1999. The firm's principals developed the 33MW Miller Creek run-of-river project (subsequently sold to Capital Power Corporation) and the 49.9MW Rutherford Creek project (subsequently sold to Innergex Renewable Energy). In 2011 Innergex Renewable Energy acquired Cloudworks Energy Inc.

== Key Personnel ==
Cloudworks described its management as "an experienced team with decades of experience in run of river development."

- Nick Andrews LL.B, MBA - Principal
- John Johnson, MBA, CFA — Principal
- David F. Andrews, P. Eng — Principal
- Graham Horn, MBA — Executive Vice President

== Power Projects ==
With 145MW of operational projects, Cloudworks was one of British Columbia's leading independent hydro power producers before its acquisition by Innergex Renewable Energy. The firm was awarded multiple Power Purchase Agreements in both BC Hydro's 2006 and 2008 power calls, which provided opportunities for future growth in its home province.

== Operational Projects ==
=== Kwalsa Energy (90MW, 384GWH/YR) ===
British Columbia's Environmental Assessment office certified this project in September 2006 and BC Hydro awarded it a power purchase agreement in that year's Open Call for Power. The overall Kwalsa Energy project is composed of four separate facilities on the following creeks: Douglas, Fire, Stokke and Tipella at Harrison Lake. It is also reported the project has a total of six 30MW plants, each with 2 x 15MW vertical pelton units.

Estimated capital costs of $263m were partially offset by the Government of Canada's $10/MWh ecoENERGY production credit, which will contribute up to $35m over 10 years. Cloudworks signed a development agreement with the Douglas First Nation, which had been reliant upon diesel generators until this project became operational in late-2009.

=== Upper Stave Energy (55MW, 264GWH/YR) ===
Like Kwalsa Energy, this project received a Power Purchase Agreement from BC Hydro in the 2006 Open Call for Power and its revenues are supplemented by the ecoENERGY production credit. Its facilities are located on the Upper Stave River and Lamont Creek.

== Projects with Power Purchase Agreements ==
Cloudworks Energy was one of the most successful bidders in BC Hydro's 2008 Call for Power, receiving three Power Purchase Agreements.

=== Northwest Stave River (18MW, 44GWH/YR) ===
- Estimated Cost: $40m

Cloudworks expects construction to begin in Spring 2011 and for the project to be operational in Fall 2013.

=== Big Silver/Shovel Creek (37MW, 110GWH/YR) ===
- Estimated Cost: $65m

Cloudworks expects construction to begin in Spring 2013 and the facility to be operational in Fall 2016.

=== Tretheway Creek (21MW, 56GWH/YR) ===
- Estimated Cost: $60m

Cloudworks expects construction to begin in Spring 2013 and the facility to be operational in Fall 2016.

== Development Projects ==
=== Statlu Creek (9MW) ===
- Estimated Cost: $25m

As of October 2010, Cloudwoks had no plans to begin construction on this project, which is to be located on the site of an 80-year-old traditional hydro dam near Chehalis, between Harrison and Stave Lake.

=== Campbell River Projects ===
In the 2008 Call for Power, Cloudworks submitted proposals for two projects located near Campbell River. Neither of these projects was awarded a Power Purchase Agreement.

== See also ==
- List of electrical generating stations in British Columbia
- Independent power producers in British Columbia
