= Malibu Hydro =

Malibu Hydro Power
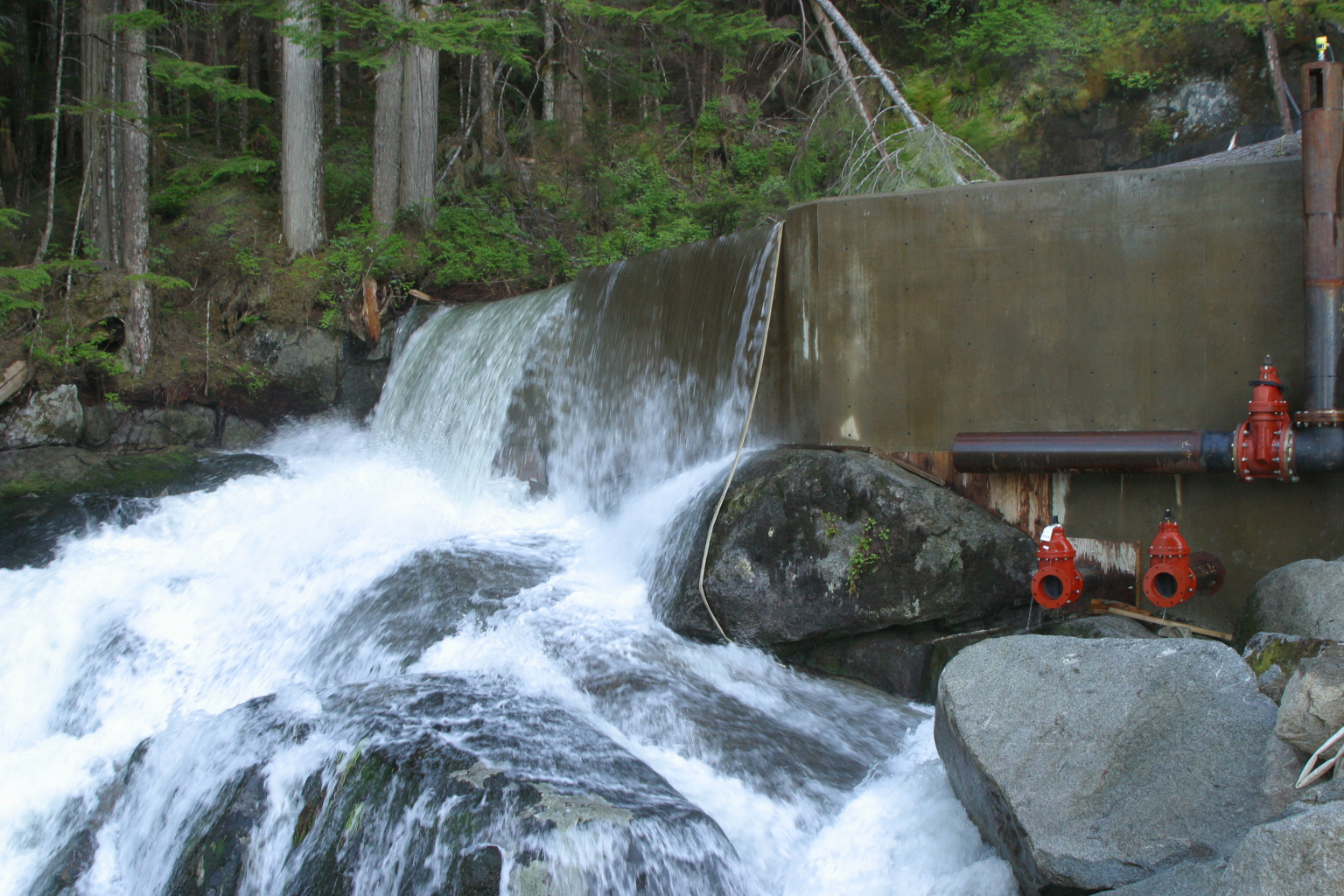
- Country: Canada
- Location: Jervis Inlet, British Columbia
- Coordinates: 50°8′40″N 123°52′40″W
- Status: Operational
- Owner: Malibu Club in Canada

Thermal power station
- Turbine technology: Micro hydro

Power generation
- Units operational: 580 kW Pelton

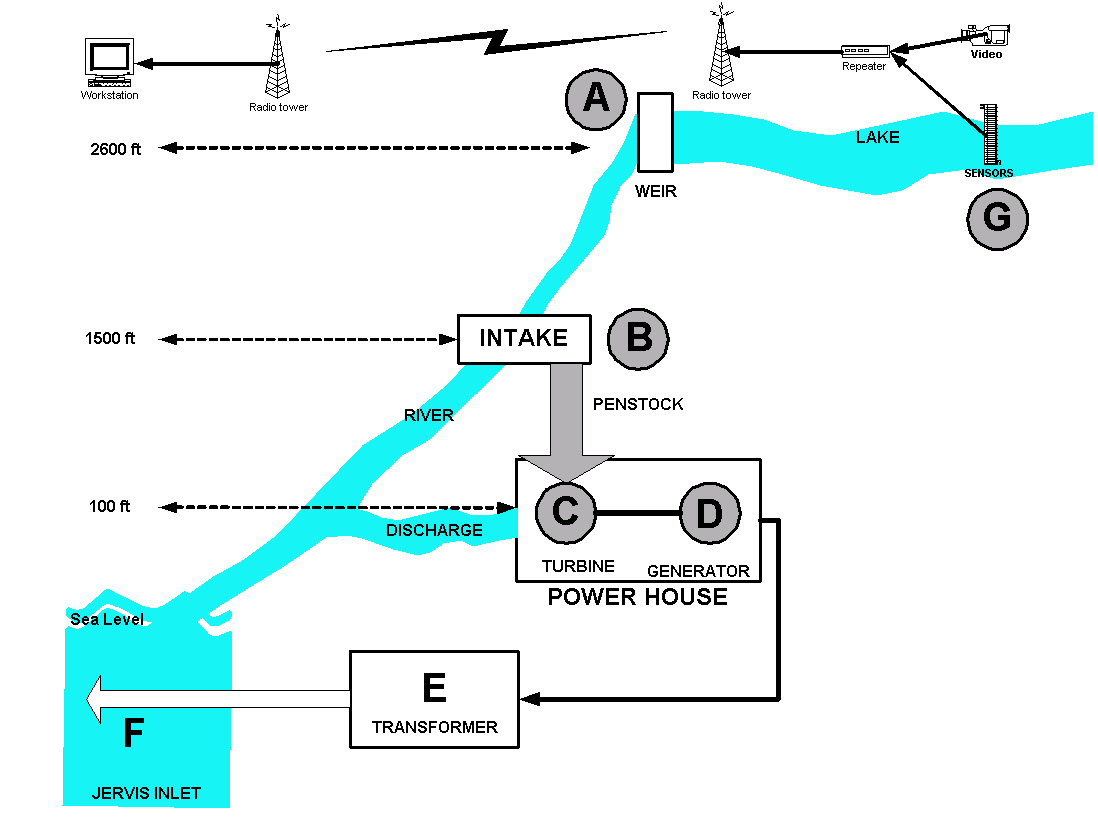
Malibu Hydro flow diagram

McCannel Creek Dam
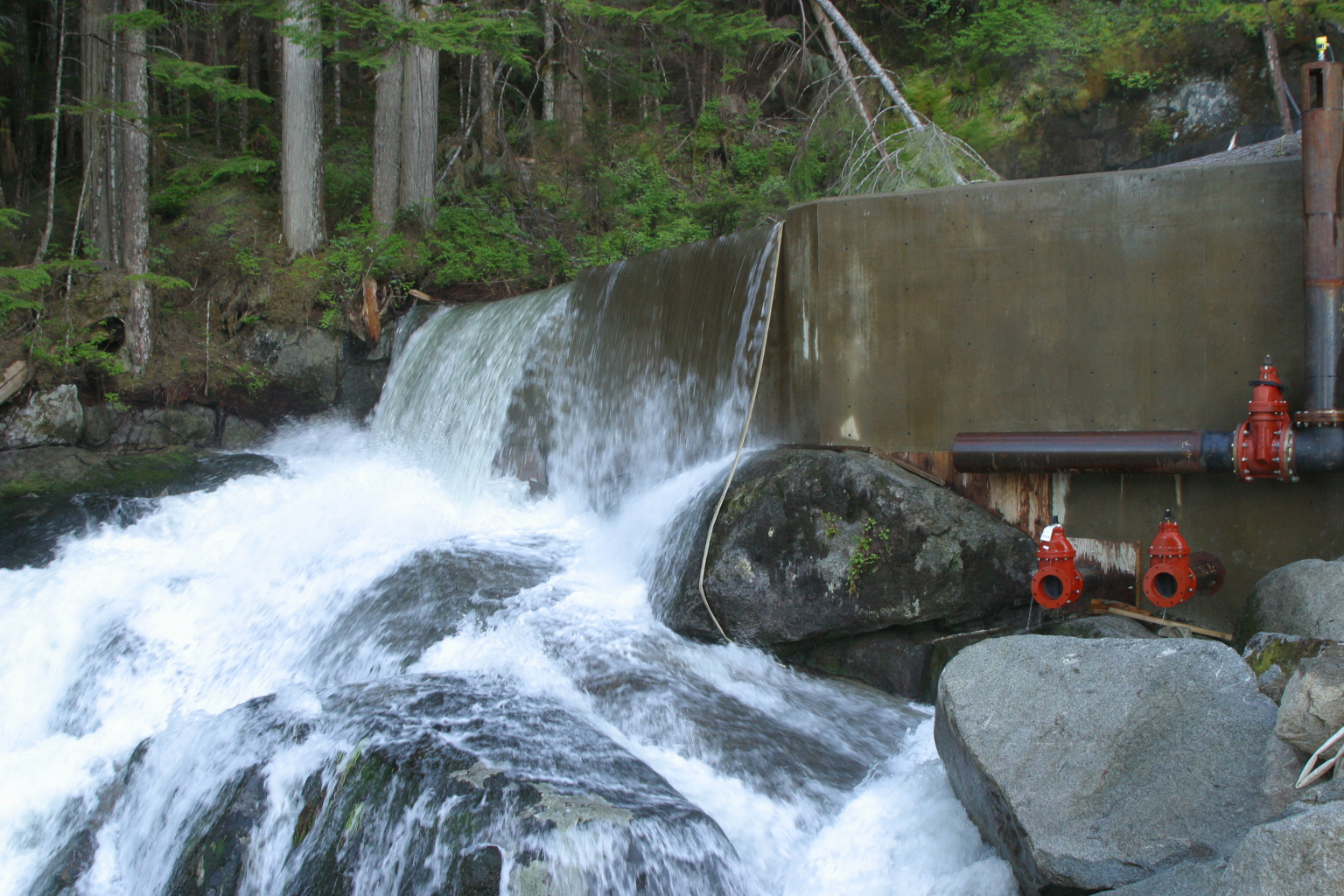
- Official name: Malibu Hydro Dam
- Location: Jervis Inlet, British Columbia, Canada

Dam and spillways
- Impounds: McCannel Creek

Reservoir
- Creates: McCannel Lake

Malibu Hydro System was designed to provide electricity to the Malibu Club in Canada. This hydro system starts from a high alpine lake where water is diverted from the lake through a steel penstock to a power house nearly 1,250 feet (380 m) below near the shore of Jervis Inlet. The flow of water turns a pelton wheel which is attached to a generator to create electricity. The electricity is then transmitted to camp by a submarine cable running under Jervis Inlet at a high voltage to reduce losses. Power is then distributed throughout camp on the existing and upgraded electrical system.

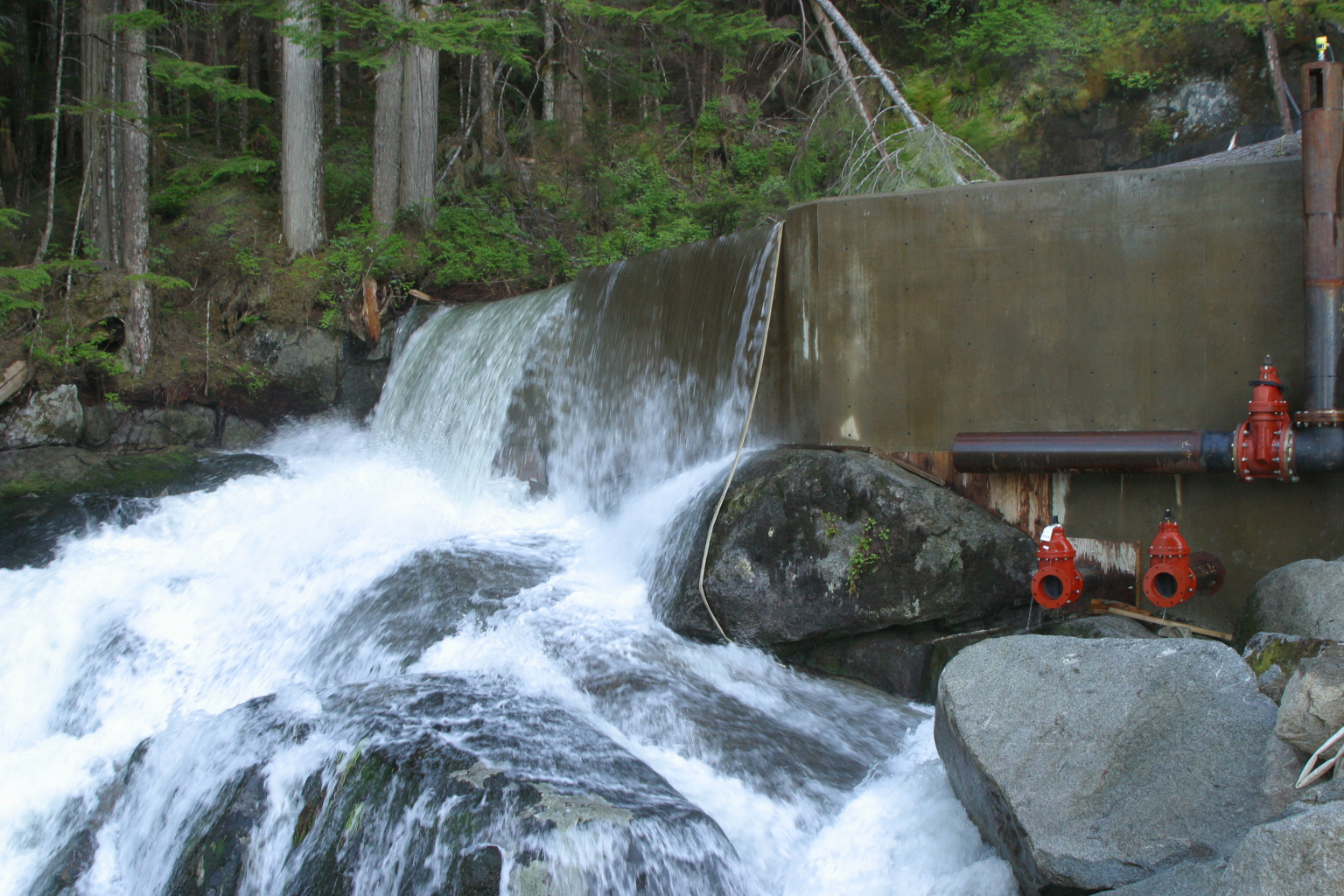
Malibu Weir at McCannel Creek

== Sources ==
The hydro turbine is feed by a yearlong creek called McCannel Creek, which is directly across Jervis Inlet from Malibu. The creek's source is McCannel Lake, at an elevation of 2,600 feet (790 m). At the outlet of the lake, a dam was built to maintain the lake level and control the flow of the creek.

== Weir (Item A) ==
A small weir type dam was built at the lake outlet, and, by limiting the discharge into the creek, aids in maintaining the lake level. The weir has a large pipe and valve in its base to pass the minimum 2 cubic feet per second (0.057 m^{3}/s) required to maintain the creek. This is in addition to the water which will be spilled to create power.

== Intake (Item B) ==
Water regulated at the lake will flow down the creek from the 2,300-foot (700 m) level to the 1,200-foot (370 m) level. Here a second weir was built across the creek that forms a large deep pool from which the 12-inch (300 mm) penstock draws water at a rate of up to 7 cu ft/s (0.20 m^{3}/s).

== Power House (Item C & D) ==
The power house contains the turbine, generator, and the necessary equipment to control and distribute the electricity for Malibu. It is located a short distance above the beach. The following diagram and table explains what happens once the water flow reaches the Power house (read the diagram right to left)

Item	Process	Function	Measure	Parameter
A	Jet & spear valve	Intake water velocity	Pressure at valve in Penstock (PSI)	10–620 PSI
B	Deflector	Deflects water flow away from turbine	Angle position of deflector (controlled by governor)	0° - 90° Degrees
C	Turbine	Pelton wheel turns in direction of water flow	How fast the turbine is turning (RPM)	Fixed (rpm)
D	Shaft	Distributes turning motion of turbine to the generator	How fast the shaft is turning	Fixed (rpm)
E	Generator	Generates the three phase AC electricity	The frequency output generated	= 60 Hz
F	Governor (ELC)	Maintains even load on Generator and flow on turbine	Frequency sample either from shaft, or generator, or switch gear	= 60 Hz
G	Switch gear	Breakers to break up flow if necessary	Halts flow of electricity if too high	---
H	Transformer	Steps the voltage up to be transferred to camp	---	600 V – 14000 V

== Power Line (Item E) ==
Transformers at the hydro generator raise 600 volts to 15,000 volts for transmission. Power is transmitted across Jervis inlet, a distance of two miles (3 km) via an underwater power line consisting of three parallel conductors. On the Malibu side of the inlet, a transformer steps the 15,000 volts down to 120 and 208 volts for use at the camp.

== History ==
It began installation in 2005.
