= Ryan River =

River in Canada

Coordinates: 50°22′00″N 122°50′00″W

The Ryan River is a short but major tributary of the Lillooet River in British Columbia, Canada, running largely eastward approximately 42 kilometres (26 mi) from its source on the eastern flank of the Pemberton Icefield before joining the Lillooet River in the area of Pemberton Meadows.

== See also ==
- List of rivers of British Columbia
