= Rutherford Creek =

Tributary of the Green River in British Columbia, Canada

Coordinates: 50°17′00″N 122°51′00″W

Rutherford Creek is a tributary of the Green River, British Columbia, Canada, entering that river a few miles above Nairn Falls Provincial Park, near the village of Pemberton. The creek's headwaters are on the eastern side of the Pemberton Icefield, from where it flows southeast for the first half of its course, then generally east for the remainder. It is approximately 24 km (15 mi) in length. The mouth is at 50° 16' 3" N, 122° 57' 41" W.

== Whitewater kayaking course ==
Rutherford Creek is the location of one of only two artificial whitewater kayaking courses in Canada, the other being in Ottawa. The course was built as a part of a run-of-the-river hydroelectric facility built by the private Rutherford Creek Power Ltd. in cooperation with the Squamish-Lillooet Regional District, the BC Whitewater Kayaking Association and the Pemberton Snowmobile Club. It includes a channel with weirs, boulders, baffle walls, anchor pads and a classroom.

== Hydroelecric plant ==
Rutherford Creek Power was constructed from 2004 to 2010 by a partnership between Cloudworks Energy, Innergex Renewable Energy and the Lil'wat First Nation. The plant uses a 9 km (5.6 mi) penstock leading to a power house with two 25 MW pelton wheels. The plant has an IPP agreement to sell electricity to BC Hydro. The construction of the plant was the subject of an episode of Discovery Channel's Mega Builders series in 2010.

== 2003 washout/flooding ==
Rutherford Creek became the focus of disaster relief when a Pineapple Express bearing more rain than has ever been recorded before reached the area, and was made worse because the freezing line was well above the elevation of the Pemberton Icecap, which began to melt in torrential fashion. Rutherford Creek is one of the main streams leading from that icecap, and the torrent which came down it wiped out the bridges used to cross it by BC Highway 99 and the BC Rail line.

== See also ==
- List of rivers of British Columbia
- List of generating stations in British Columbia
- Independent power producers in British Columbia
