= List of inland ferries in British Columbia =

This list details the privately operated ferry routes traversing lakes and rivers of inland British Columbia, Canada. This list does not include coastal routes operated by BC Ferries and/or its subcontractors.

== List of current routes ==
The current inland ferries in BC are as follows:

Route Name	Route Details	Vessel Name(s)	Vessel Type(s)	Vehicle Capacity	Passenger Capacity	Crossing Time	Operated By	Notes	Reference(s)
Adams Lake Cable Ferry	Crosses Adams Lake between Chase and Sorrento, off BC Highway 1.	M.V. Adams Lake II	Cable	10	48	5 minutes	Waterbridge Ferries Incorporated		
Arrow Park Cable Ferry	Crosses the juncture of Upper Arrow Lake and Lower Arrow Lake southwest of Nakusp, off BC Highway 6.	M.V. Arrow Park II	Cable	24	48	5 minutes	Waterbridge Ferries Incorporated		
Barnston Island Ferry	Crosses the Parsons Channel on the Fraser River between Port Kells and Barnston Island.	M.V. Centurion VI (Tugboat) + Barnston Island Replacement Barge (Barge)	Tugboat and Barge	5	52	5 minutes	Western Pacific Marine		
Big Bar Reaction Ferry	Crosses the Fraser River northwest of Clinton.	Vessel Unknown	Reaction	2	12	10 minutes	Interior Roads	Replaced by an aerial passenger tramway during icy or low water conditions.	
Digby Island Ferry	Crosses Prince Rupert Harbour between Fairview and Digby.	M.V. Digby Island Ferry	Conventional	12	156	20 minutes	City of Prince Rupert		
François Lake Ferry	Crosses François Lake between the community of François Lake (also known as Northbank) and Southbank, on BC Highway 35.	M.V. François Forrester/M.V. Omineca Princess	Conventional	52 (M.V. François Forrester); other vessel not known.	145 (M.V. François Forrester); other vessel not known.	15 minutes	Waterbridge Ferries Incorporated		
Glade Cable Ferry	Crosses the Kootenay River at Tarry's, off BC Highway 3A.	M.V. Glade II	Cable	10	48	3 minutes	Western Pacific Marine		
Harrop Cable Ferry	Crosses the west arm of Kootenay Lake between Longbeach and Harrop, off BC Highway 3A.	M.V. Harrop II	Cable	24	98	5 minutes	Western Pacific Marine		
Kootenay Lake Ferry	Crosses Kootenay Lake between Balfour and Kootenay Bay, on BC Highway 3A.	M.V. Osprey 2000/M.V. Balfour	Conventional	80/28	250/150	35 minutes	Western Pacific Marine		
Little Fort Reaction Ferry	Crosses the North Thompson River at Little Fort, off BC Highway 5.	Vessel Unknown	Reaction	2	12	5 minutes	Argo Road Maintenance Incorporated		
Lytton Reaction Ferry	Crosses the Fraser River just north of Lytton, off BC Highway 12.	Vessel Unknown	Reaction	2	18	5 minutes	Yellowhead Road & Bridge (Nicola) Limited		
McLure Reaction Ferry	Crosses the North Thompson River north of Kamloops, off BC Highway 5.	Vessel Unknown	Reaction	2	12	5 minutes	Argo Road Maintenance Incorporated	No service during high water or winter freeze up. Detour via Westsyde Road.	
Needles Cable Ferry	Crosses Lower Arrow Lake between Fauquier and Needles, on BC Highway 6.	M.V. Needles	Cable	40	135	5 minutes	Waterbridge Ferries Incorporated		
Upper Arrow Lake Ferry	Crosses Upper Arrow Lake between Shelter Bay and Galena Bay at the junction of BC highways 23 and 31.	M.V. Columbia	Conventional	80	250	20 minutes	Waterbridge Ferries Incorporated		
Usk Reaction Ferry	Crosses the Skeena River between north and south Usk, off BC Highway 16.	Vessel Unknown	Reaction	2	12	5-7 minutes	Nechacko Northcoast Contractors	Replaced by an aerial passenger tramway during icy or low water conditions.	

== List of former routes ==
former inland ferry routes in BC were as follows:

Route Name	Route Details	Vessel name(s)	Vessel Type(s)	Vehicle Capacity	Passenger Capacity	Crossing Time	Operated By	Notes
Agassiz-Rosedale Ferry	Crossed the Fraser River between Agassiz and Rosedale.	M.V. T'Lagunna/M.V. Eena	Conventional	18 (M.V. T'Lagunna)	100 (M.V. T'Lagunna)	Unknown.	Unknown	Replaced by the Agassiz-Rosedale Bridge in 1956.
Albion Ferry	Crossed the Fraser River between Albion and Fort Langley.	M.V. T'Lagunna/M.V. Kulleet/M.V. Klatawa	Conventional	26 (M.V. Kulleet/M.V. Klatawa). 18 (M.V. T'Lagunna)	150 (M.V. Kulleet/M.V. Klatawa). 100 (M.V. T'Lagunna).	Unknown.	Fraser River Marine Transportation Limited (Owned by TransLink, formerly known as the Greater Vancouver Transit Authority, and originally operated the Ministry of Highways).	Replaced by the Golden Ears Bridge in 2009.
Alexandria Ferry	Crossed the Fraser River at Alexandria, south of Quesnel.	Unknown	Unknown	Vehicle capacity not known.	Passenger capacity not known.	Unknown	Unknown	Not to be confused with the bridges north of Hope.
Birch Island Ferry	Crossed the North Thompson River at Birch Island, east of Clearwater.	Unknown	Unknown	Vehicle capacity not known.	Passenger capacity not known.	Unknown	Unknown	
Blackpool Ferry	Crossed the North Thompson River at Blackpool, south of Clearwater.	Unknown	Unknown	Vehicle capacity not known.	Passenger capacity not known.	Unknown	Unknown	
Braeside Ferry	Crossed the Nechako River at Braeside, east of Vanderhoof.	Unknown	Unknown	Vehicle capacity not known.	Passenger capacity not known.	Unknown	Unknown	
Castlegar Ferry	Crossed the Columbia River between Castlegar and Robson.	Unknown	Cable	Vehicle capacity not known.	Passenger capacity not known.	Unknown	Government of British Columbia	Operated from 1910 until the opening of the Robson Bridge in the 1990s. Its northern landing is now the Lion's Head boat launch.
Cedarvale Ferry	Crossed the Skeena River at Cedarvale, to the southwest of Kitwanga.	Unknown	Unknown	2 cars or a single pick-up truck.	Passenger capacity not known.	Unknown	Unknown	Service ended in 1975. No replacement bridge was constructed.
Chilliwack-Harrison Ferry	Navigated the Fraser and Harrison Rivers between an area near Chilliwack and Harrison Hot Springs.	Unknown	Unknown	Vehicle capacity not known.	Passenger capacity not known.	Unknown	Possibly subsidized by the Government of British Columbia	
Chinook Cove Ferry	Crossed the North Thompson River at Chinook Cove, north of Barriere.	Unknown	Unknown	Vehicle capacity not known.	Passenger capacity not known.	Unknown	Unknown	
Clayhurst Ferry	Crossed the Peace River near Clayhurst.	Unknown	Unknown	Vehicle capacity not known.	Passenger capacity not known.	Unknown	Unknown	Replaced by bridge.
Copper City Ferry	Crossed the Skeena River at Copper City.	Unknown	Unknown	Vehicle capacity not known.	Passenger capacity not known.	Unknown	Unknown	
Dunster Ferry	Crossed the Fraser River at Dunster.	Unknown	Unknown	Vehicle capacity not known.	Passenger capacity not known.	Unknown	Unknown	Date of cessation of service unknown. Bridge in place today.
Fort St. James Ferry	Crossed the Stuart River near Fort St. James.	Unknown	Unknown	Vehicle capacity not known.	Passenger capacity not known.	Unknown	Unknown	
Goldstream Ferry	Crossed the Columbia River at Lake Revelstoke, likely near the mouth of the Goldstream River, north of Revelstoke.	Unknown	Unknown	Vehicle capacity not known.	Passenger capacity not known.	Unknown	Unknown	Date of cessation of service unknown. Not replaced.
Gravelle (Gravel's) Ferry	Crossed the Quesnel River about 21 km southeast of Quesnel.	Unknown	Unknown	Vehicle capacity not known.	Passenger capacity not known.	Unknown	Unknown	
Hall's Landing Ferry	Crossed the Columbia River 3 Miles north of Arrowhead.	Unknown	Unknown	Vehicle capacity not known.	Passenger capacity not known.	Unknown	Unknown	Date of cessation of service unknown. Could be an earlier 24 Mile Ferry.
Hazelton Ferry	Crossed the Skeena River at Hazelton.	Unknown	Unknown	Vehicle capacity not known.	Passenger capacity not known.	Unknown	Unknown	
Herrling Island Ferry	Crossed the Fraser River between a location near Agassiz and Herrling Island.	Unknown	Cable	Vehicle capacity not known.	Passenger capacity not known.	Unknown	Unknown	Date of cessation of service unknown. Not replaced.
Hulatt Ferry	Likely crossed the Nechako River at Hulatt east of Vanderhoof.	Unknown	Unknown	Vehicle capacity not known.	Passenger capacity not known.	Unknown	Unknown	Date of cessation of service unknown. Not replaced.
Isle Pierre Ferry	Crossed the Nechako River at Isle Pierre, west of Prince George.	Unknown	Unknown	Vehicle capacity not known.	Passenger capacity not known.	Unknown	Unknown	Service ended around 1983.
Kitwanga Ferry	Crossed the Skeena River at Kitwanga.	Unknown	Unknown	Vehicle capacity not known.	Passenger capacity not known.	Unknown	Unknown	
Ladner Ferry	Crossed the Fraser River between Ladner and Richmond.	M.V. Delta Princess	Conventional	35	200	10 minutes	Government of British Columbia	Replaced by the George Massey Tunnel in 1959.
Lewis Ferry	Crossed the Kootenay River at Lewis, northwest of Creston.	Unknown	Unknown	Vehicle capacity not known.	Passenger capacity not known.	Unknown	Unknown	Date of cessation of service unknown. Not replaced.
Marguerite/Macalister Ferry	Crossed the Fraser River near Marguerite.	Unknown	Unknown	Vehicle capacity not known.	Passenger capacity not known.	5 minutes	Government of British Columbia	Macalister renamed Marguerite in the 1960s. Serviced ended around 2003 to the dismay of residents.
McBride Ferry	Crossed the Fraser River at McBride.	Unknown	Unknown	Vehicle capacity not known.	Passenger capacity not known.	Unknown	Unknown	Replaced by a bridge.
Miller's Ferry	Crossed the Fraser River at Lillooet, connecting the Cariboo Road.	Unknown	Cable	Vehicle capacity not known.	Passenger capacity not known.	Unknown	Unknown	Replaced by a truss bridge in 1888.
Mission-Matsqui Ferry Ferry	Crossed the Fraser River between Mission and Matsqui.	Unknown	Unknown	Vehicle capacity not known.	Passenger capacity not known.	Unknown	Unknown	Replaced by road/rail bridge.
Miworth/No. 3 IR Ferry	Crossed the Nechako River at Miworth, west of Prince George.	Unknown	Unknown	Vehicle capacity not known.	Passenger capacity not known.	Unknown	Unknown	Service ended in the 1940s.
Monte Creek Ferry	Crossed the South Thompson River at Monte Creek.	Unknown	Unknown	Vehicle capacity not known.	Passenger capacity not known.	Unknown	Unknown	
New Westminster-Brownsville Ferry	Crossed the Fraser River between New Westminster and Brownsville (also known as South Westminster), in what is now Surrey.	M.V. K de K	Conventional	None carried	Passenger capacity not known.	Unknown	Unknown	Replaced by the New Westminster Railway Bridge. Operated from 1882.
North Bend Aerial Ferry	Crossed the Fraser River between Boston Bar and North Bend.	Unknown	Aerial tramway	1	Passenger capacity not known.	Unknown	Unknown	Replaced by the Cog Harrington Bridge in 1986.
Okanagan Lake Ferry	Crossed Okanagan Lake between Kelowna and Westbank.	M.V. Lequime/M.V. Lloyd-Jones/M.V. Pendozi/	Conventional	30 (M.V. Pendozi); others not known.	325 (M.V. Lequime); others not known.	Unknown	Government of British Columbia	Replaced by the Okanagan Lake Bridge in 1958.
Pacific Ferry	Crossed the Skeena River at Pacific, located between Usk and Cedarvale.	Unknown	Unknown	Vehicle capacity not known.	Passenger capacity not known.	Unknown	Unknown	
Pavilion Aerial Ferry	Crossed the Fraser River between Pavilion and West Pavilion.	Unknown	Aerial tramway	Vehicle capacity not known.	Passenger capacity not known.	Unknown	Unknown	Currently not in use.
Pitt River Ferry	Crossed the Pitt River between Pitt Meadows and what is now Port Coquitlam.	Vessel Unknown	Conventional - Gasoline Engine	Vehicle capacity not known.	Passenger capacity not known.	Unknown.	George Mouldey with subsidies from the Government of British Columbia.	Ran from 27 September 1902 until March 1915. Replaced by the first Pitt River Bridge.
Pritchard Ferry	Crossed the South Thompson River at Pritchard.	Unknown	Unknown	Vehicle capacity not known.	Passenger capacity not known.	Unknown	Unknown	Replaced by a bridge.
Quesnel Ferry	Crossed the Fraser River at Quesnel.	Unknown	Unknown	Vehicle capacity not known.	Passenger capacity not known.	Unknown	Unknown	Replaced by the Fraser River Walking Bridge in 1929.
Remo/Breckenridge (Landing) Ferry	Crossed the Skeena River just west of Terrace at Remo.	Unknown	Unknown	Vehicle capacity not known.	Passenger capacity not known.	Unknown	Unknown	Breckenridge renamed Remo at an unknown time.
Soda Creek Ferry	Crossed the Fraser River at Soda Creek.	Unknown	Unknown	Vehicle capacity not known.	Passenger capacity not known.	Unknown	Unknown	
Taylor Flats (Taylor) Ferry	Crossed the Peace River at Taylor, possibly near Taylor Landing Provincial Park.	Unknown	Unknown	Vehicle capacity not known.	Passenger capacity not known.	Unknown	Unknown	Probably replaced by the first Peace River Bridge.
Terrace Ferry	Crossed the Skeena River at Terrace via Ferry Island.	Unknown	Unknown	Vehicle capacity not known.	Passenger capacity not known.	Unknown	Unknown	Replaced by the Old Terrace Bridge in 1925.
Trail Ferry	Crossed the Columbia River at Trail.	Unknown	Unknown	N/A	Passenger capacity not known.	Unknown	City of Trail	Possibly Replaced by the "Old Bridge" in 1912.
Vavenby Ferry	Crossed the North Thompson River at Vavenby, east of Clearwater.	Unknown	Unknown	Vehicle capacity not known.	Passenger capacity not known.	Unknown	Unknown	
Vinsulla Ferry	Crossed the North Thompson River between Black Pines and Vinsulla.	Unknown	Unknown	Vehicle capacity not known.	Passenger capacity not known.	Unknown	Unknown	
West Creston Ferry/Reclamation Farm Ferry	Crossed the Kootenay River between the Lower Kootenay 1C Reserve and West Creston.	Unknown	Unknown	10 Cars in later years.	Passenger capacity not known.	Unknown	Government of British Columbia	Possibly the same ferry.

== See also ==
- BC Ferries, operator of coastal ferries in BC
