= Little Fort Ferry =

Coordinates: 51.422092°N 120.201201°W

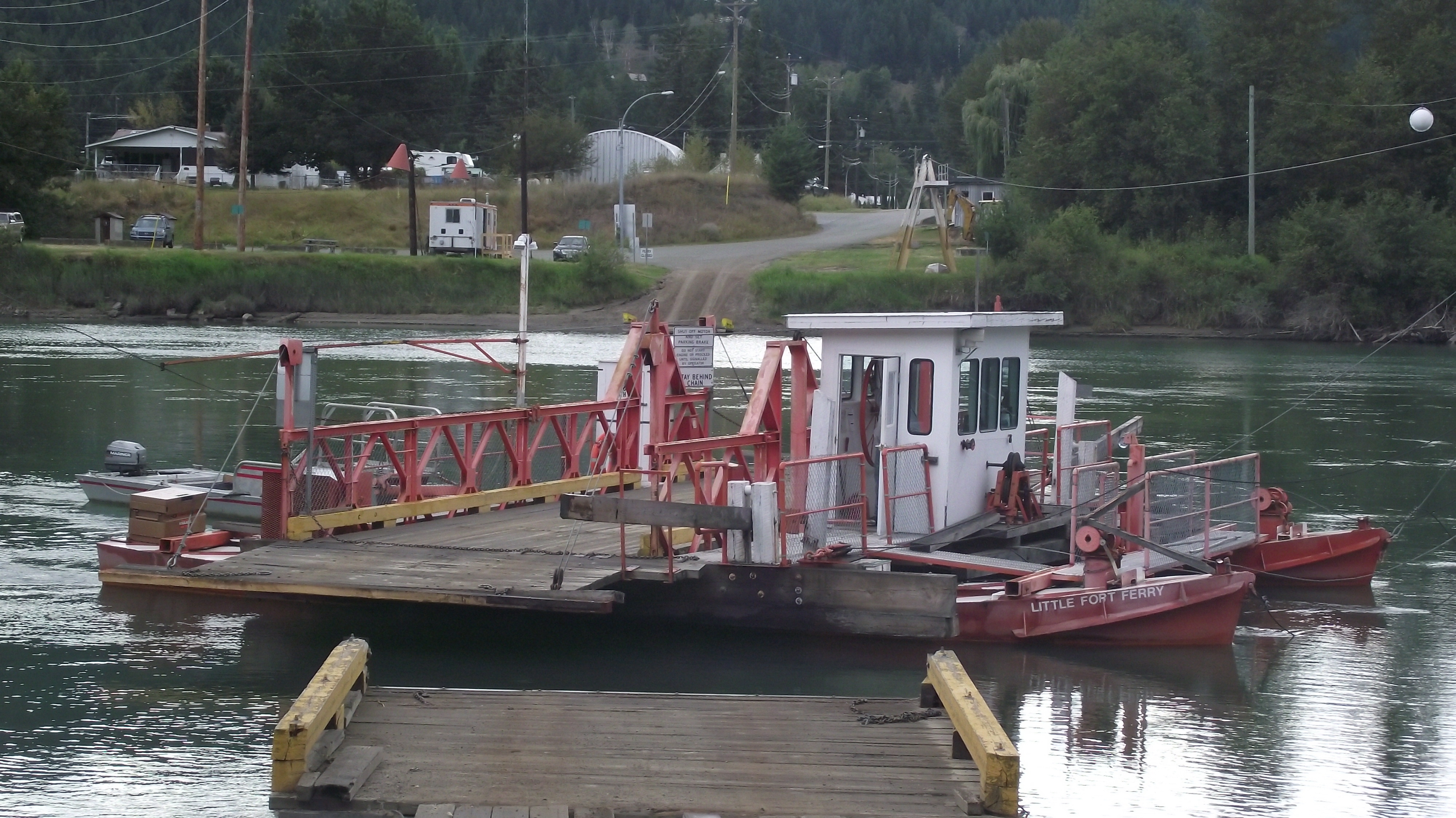
Little Fort Ferry

The Little Fort Ferry is a cable ferry across the North Thompson River in British Columbia, Canada. It is situated at Little Fort, about 93 kilometres (58 mi) north of Kamloops.

Technically, the ferry is a reaction ferry, which is propelled by the current of the water. An overhead cable is suspended from towers anchored on either bank of the river, and a "traveller" is installed on the cable. The ferry is attached to the traveller by a bridle cable. To operate the ferry, rudders are used to ensure that the pontoons are angled into the current, causing the force of the current to move the ferry across the river.

The ferry operates under contract to the British Columbia Ministry of Transportation, is free of tolls, and runs on demand between 0700 and 1820. It carries a maximum of 2 cars and 12 passengers at a time. The crossing is about 100 metres (330 ft) in length, and takes 5 minutes.

== See also ==
- Adams Lake Cable Ferry
- Arrow Park Ferry
- Barnston Island Ferry
- Big Bar Ferry
- Francois Lake Ferry
- Glade Cable Ferry
- Kootenay Lake Ferry
- Harrop Ferry
- Lytton Ferry
- McLure Ferry
- Needles Ferry
- Upper Arrow Lake Ferry
- Usk Ferry
