= Upper Arrow Lake Ferry =

Ferry in British Columbia, Canada

Coordinates: 50.629187°N 117.899619°W

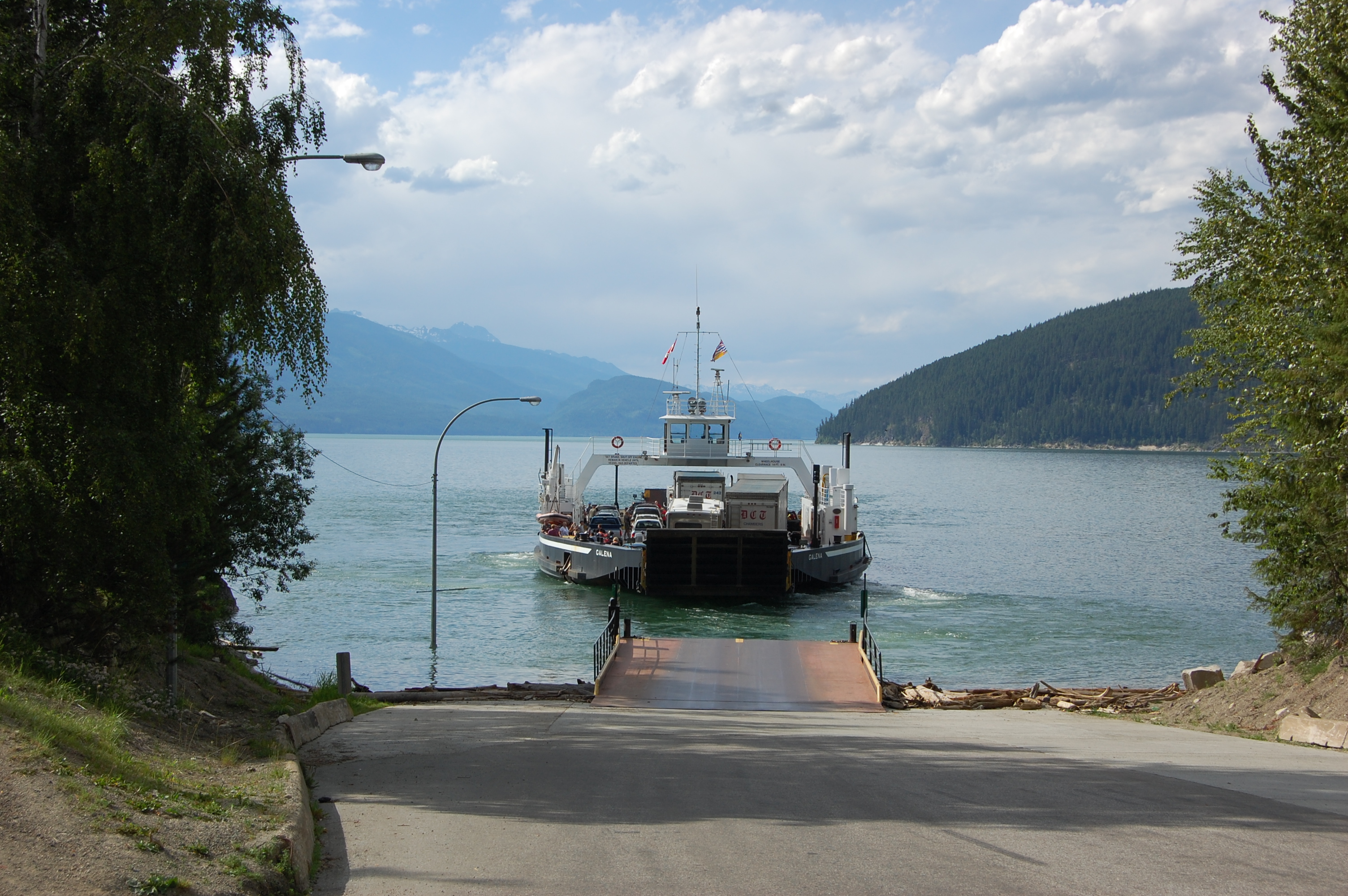
- Upper Arrow Lake Ferry from Galena Bay.
- Locale: Balfour−Galena Bay
- Waterway: Upper Arrow Lake
- Transit type: Passenger and automobile ferry
- Carries: Highway 23
- Operator: WaterBridge Ferries Inc.
- System length: 5 km (3 mi)
- No. of lines: 1
- No. of vessels: 1
- No. of terminals: 2
- Website: www2.gov.bc.ca/gov/content/transportation/passenger-travel/water-travel/inland-ferries/upper-arrow-lake-ferry

The Upper Arrow Lake Ferry is a ferry across Upper Arrow Lake in the West Kootenay region of southeastern British Columbia. Linking Shelter Bay and Galena Bay, the ferry, part of BC Highway 23, is by road about 52 kilometres (32 mi) south of Revelstoke and 47 kilometres (29 mi) north of Nakusp.

== Arrowhead–Beaton ==
In 1896, the Canadian Pacific Railway's (CP) Revelstoke–Arrowhead branch line opened along the east side of the Columbia River. At that time, the Arrowhead–Thomson's Landing (former name of Beaton), head of the lake, east–west ferry service commenced. CP gradually withdrew its sternwheelers from the lake. By 1942, only the Minto remained. In 1954, CP abandoned the lake.

== Beaton–Galena Bay–Arrowhead ==
In 1916, James C. Fitzsimmons began this upper lake service, subsidized by the province. Initially chartering the CP tug Columbia, he soon bought the 23-metre (75 ft) Yale. In 1928, the Beaton Boat Co. became the operator, using its new steam tug Beaton to push a barge. In 1944, the Beaton Navigation Co. acquired the business. In 1953, the Arrow Lake Transportation Co. became the operator. The next year, the subsidy ended, and the Interior Tug and Transport Co. won the contract for a Beaton–Arrowhead–Nakusp–Castlegar service. The 13-vehicle capacity diesel ferry Arrow Park made three trips weekly. In 1956, the British Columbia Ministry of Transportation took over the route and bought the vessel, renaming it the Lardeau.

== Arrowhead–Galena Bay ==
In 1957, the most easterly terminal relocated from Beaton to Galena Bay. In 1968, the Arrowhead branch line closed, the western ferry terminal relocated to Shelter Bay (after the reservoir for the Keenleyside Dam flooded the former Arrowhead), and ferry fares were eliminated on the Upper Arrow Lake.

== Shelter Bay–Galena Bay ==
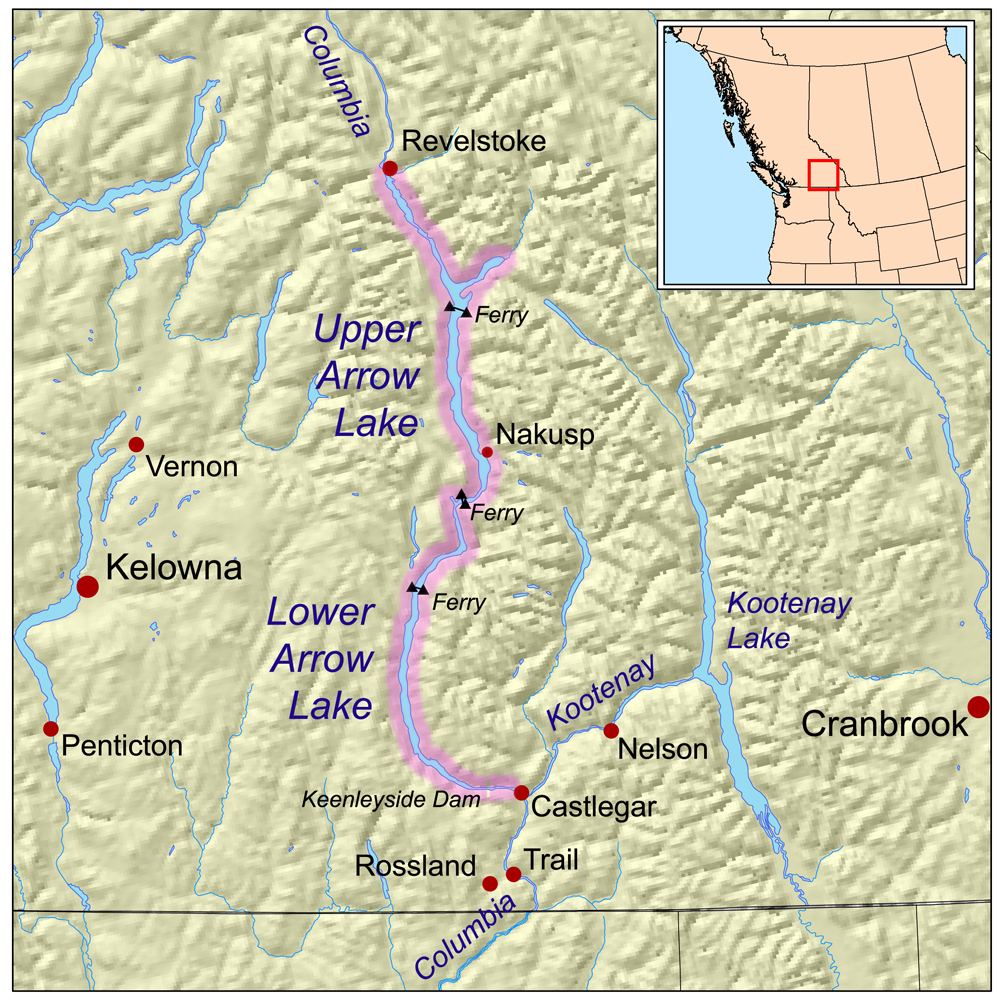
Shelter Bay–Galena Bay is the uppermost ferry route

Announced in 1965, and implemented within a few years, were the construction of a new Revelstoke–Shelter Bay road along the west side of the Columbia, the introduction of a Shelter Bay–Galena Bay ferry, and a major upgrade to the Nakusp–Galena Bay road.

=== Timeline ===
1969: DEV Galena with a 35-vehicle, 200-passenger capacity (built 1968), replaced the 12 Mile and 24 Mile ferries.
1990: DEV Galena modified to a 50-vehicle, 150-passenger capacity vessel. MV Needles relocated from Needles Ferry route and renamed MV Shelter Bay (built 1969).
2002: The service, which operated 5am to 1am, was reduced to 6am to midnight.
2004: Western Pacific Marine became the service contractor.
2007: By this time, service was 6:30am to 11:30pm.
2008: Service was restored as 5am to 1am.
c.2013: WaterBridge Ferries became the service provider.
2014: Designed and built by WaterBridge Steel at Nakusp, the 80-vehicle, 250-passenger capacity MV Columbia was introduced to replace the two smaller vessels. Wider lanes and improved ramp transitions allowed faster loading and unloading.
2020: A vehicle drove off the Shelter Bay terminal ahead of the incoming ferry. The driver, who was rescued, did not suffer any major injuries. An underwater dive team attached a tow truck cable to the submerged vehicle, which was lifted from the water.

=== Operation ===
The ferry operates under contract to the British Columbia Ministry of Transportation and Infrastructure and is free of tolls, as are all inland ferries in British Columbia. The MV Columbia sails every thirty minutes, from the first departure from Shelter Bay at 5am until the last at midnight, with a crossing time of about twenty minutes (the first and last departures are 5:30am and 12:30am from Galena Bay). The ferry has capacity for 80 vehicles and 250 passengers.

== See also ==
- Adams Lake Cable Ferry
- Albion Ferry
- Arrow Park Ferry
- Barnston Island Ferry
- Big Bar Ferry
- Francois Lake Ferry
- Glade Cable Ferry
- Harrop Ferry
- Kootenay Lake Ferry
- Lytton Ferry
- Little Fort Ferry
- McLure Ferry
- Needles Ferry
- Usk Ferry
