= Lytton Ferry =

Passenger and vehicle ferry across the Fraser River in British Columbia

Coordinates: 50°14′50″N 121°35′30″W

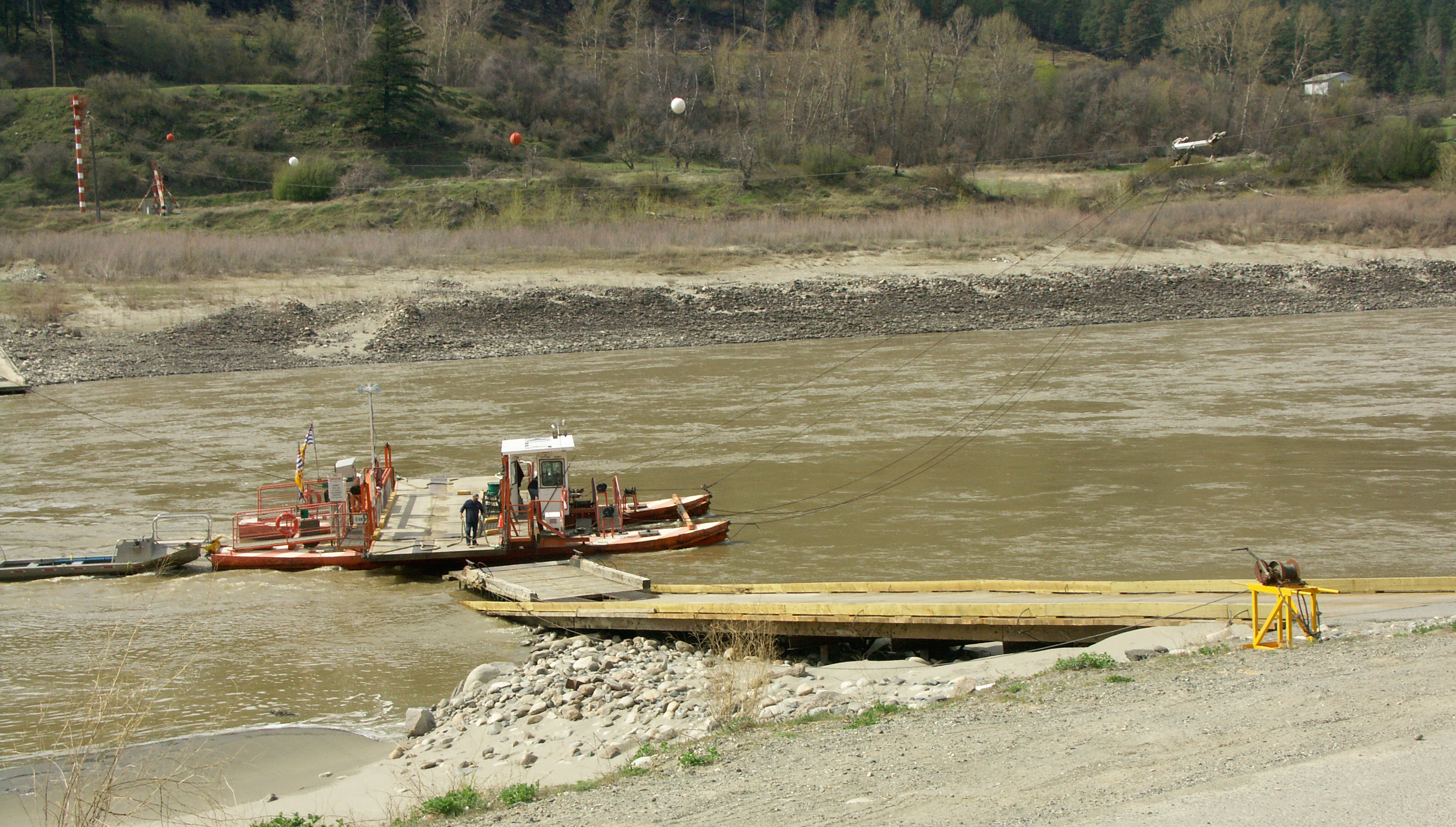
- Locale: 2.4km north of Lytton, British Columbia
- Waterway: Fraser River
- Transit type: Passenger and vehicle ferry
- Owner: British Columbia Ministry of Transportation
- Operator: VSA Highway Maintenance Ltd.
- System length: 150m
- No. of lines: 1
- No. of vessels: 1
- No. of terminals: 2
- Website: www2.gov.bc.ca/gov/content/transportation/passenger-travel/water-travel/inland-ferries/lytton-reaction-ferry

The Lytton Ferry is a cable ferry across the Fraser River in British Columbia, Canada. It is situated about 2.4 kilometres (1.5 mi) north of Lytton.

Technically, the ferry is a reaction ferry, which is propelled by the current of the water. An overhead cable is suspended from towers anchored on either bank of the river, and a "traveller" is installed on the cable. The ferry is attached to the traveller by a bridle cable. To operate the ferry, rudders are used to ensure that the pontoons are angled into the current, causing the force of the current to move the ferry across the river.

The ferry operates under contract to the British Columbia Ministry of Transportation, is free of tolls, and runs on demand between 0630 and 2215. It carries a maximum of 2 cars, or one small school bus, and 18 passengers at a time. The crossing is about 150 metres (490 ft) in length, and takes 5 minutes. The ferry does not operate at times of high water.

== See also ==
- List of crossings of the Fraser River
- Adams Lake Cable Ferry
- Arrow Park Ferry
- Barnston Island Ferry
- Big Bar Ferry
- Francois Lake Ferry
- Glade Cable Ferry
- Kootenay Lake Ferry
- Harrop Ferry
- Little Fort Ferry
- McLure Ferry
- Needles Ferry
- Upper Arrow Lake Ferry
- Usk Ferry
