= Reaction ferry =

Cable ferry that uses river current for propulsion

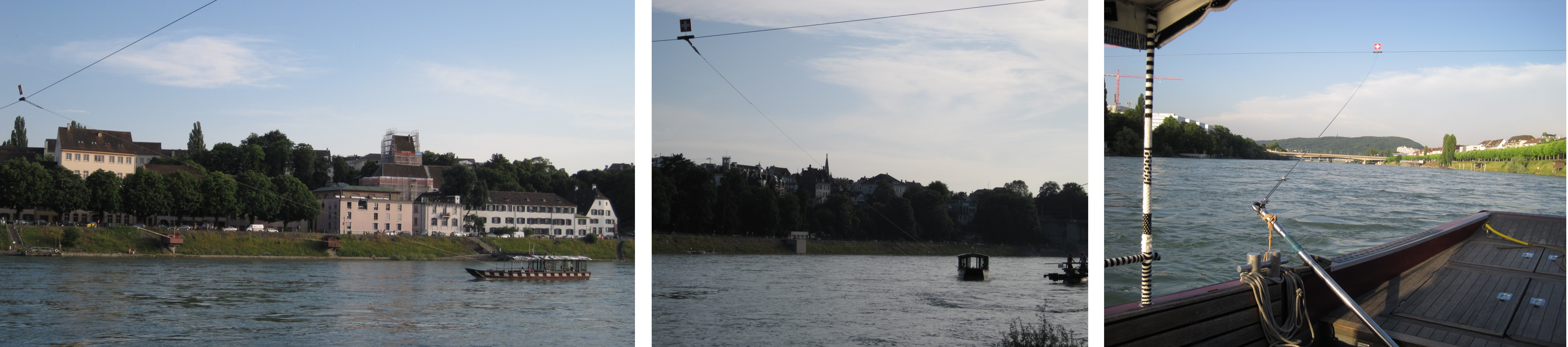
Reaction ferry crossing the Rhine at Basel, Switzerland

A reaction ferry is a cable ferry that uses the reaction of the current of a river against a fixed tether to propel the vessel across the water. Such ferries operate faster and more effectively in rivers with strong currents.

== Types and modes of operation ==
Some reaction ferries operate using an overhead cable suspended from towers anchored on either bank of the river at right angles to the current flow. A "traveller" with pulleys runs along this cable and is attached to the ferry with a tether rope. This can divide into a two-part bridle which defines the angle of the ferry to the current. Sometimes two pulleys and tethers are used. Sometimes a single tether is attached to a bar that can be swung from one side of the ferry to the other. This type also uses a rudder in order to set the angle of the ferry to the current flow from zero - it is then stationary - to the best angle for maximal crossing speed. Ferries without a rudder change the relative lengths of the bridle or multiple tethers in order to steer. The lateral force of the current moves the ferry across the river.

A now rare type of reaction ferry uses a submerged cable lying on the bottom across a river or tidal water. This can be a wire rope or a chain and is pulled to the surface by the ferry or its operator. It passes through moveable pulleys or belaying points whose location sets the ferry's angle. In order to set off, manual work is required to initially pull the cable and also to manoeuvre, especially during the turning of the tide.

The ferry may consist of a single hull, or two pontoons with a deck bridging them. Some ferries carry only passengers, whilst others carry road vehicles, with some examples carrying up to 12 cars, such as the Usk reaction ferry in British Columbia, Canada.

== Physical explanation ==
Force diagram of a reaction ferry with a traveller

A reaction ferry operates as a sailing craft where the traveller pulleys represent the wheels of a land yacht and the moving fluid is the water current rather than the wind. In the case of a reaction ferry with an anchored tether, the analogy can also be to a kite. In both cases the ferry's hull itself represents a sail and is angled to the apparent water current in order to generate lift in the same way a sail is set at an angle to the apparent wind.

With an overhead cable stretched across a river at right angles to the current, the ferry is, in sailing terminology, sailing on a reach with the true current exactly at right angles to the direction of crossing. For the anchored-tether type ferry this is valid when the tether is parallel to the current, near the middle of crossing. In sailing, the speed is governed by the lift-to-drag ratios (L/D) of the sail and the hull including centerboard or keel and rudder.

For reaction ferries, L/D ratios also apply except that one is very high, for example typically 30 for a traveller on a steel rope, as visible in aerial photographs, and the other can vary from low, e.g. 1-2 without a centerboard, to 3.5 with one.

A diagram is shown which follows the standard force diagram for sailing. It is drawn with a traveller L/D of only about 6 in order to make it clearer. The ferry L/D is drawn at 1.5. The lift L acts at right angles to the direction of the apparent current, the vector sum of the true current and the current component due to the crossing speed. The drag D acts parallel to the apparent current. The vector sum of L and D is the resultant force R. This force can only exist because the tether exerts an opposed force of the same magnitude (see Newton's laws of motion), in this simplified two-dimensional projection of what is really a three-dimensional situation. R can be resolved in a drag component directly downstream and a component in the direction of crossing, the thrust T which drives the ferry. This is balanced by the opposing drag of the traveller pulleys. The amount of lift required is set by the angle of incidence of the ferry to the apparent current (here 10°), often done with a rudder (not shown).

In the figure the crossing speed is the same as the speed of the true current. With a centerboard or keel, the hull's L/D could increase several times. This would increase the crossing speed also several times, but according to the drag equation the forces increase with the square of the speed and put a great load particularly on the overhead cable. With the anchored-tether type ferry, such high speeds would be unobtainable because its tether drags in the water or is supported by buoys that do and this drag would also increase with the square of the speed.

== Worldwide usage ==
=== Austria ===
- Ferry from Weißenkirchen in der Wachau to St. Lorenz across the Danube
- Ferry from Spitz an der Donau to Arnsdorf across the Danube
- Ferry from Ottensheim to Wilhering across the Danube
- Ferry from Korneuburg to Klosterneuburg across the Danube 12 km north of Vienna
- Ferry from Weitersfeld an der Mur to Sladki Vrh (Slovenia) across the Mur river, recognised as a border crossing

=== Canada ===
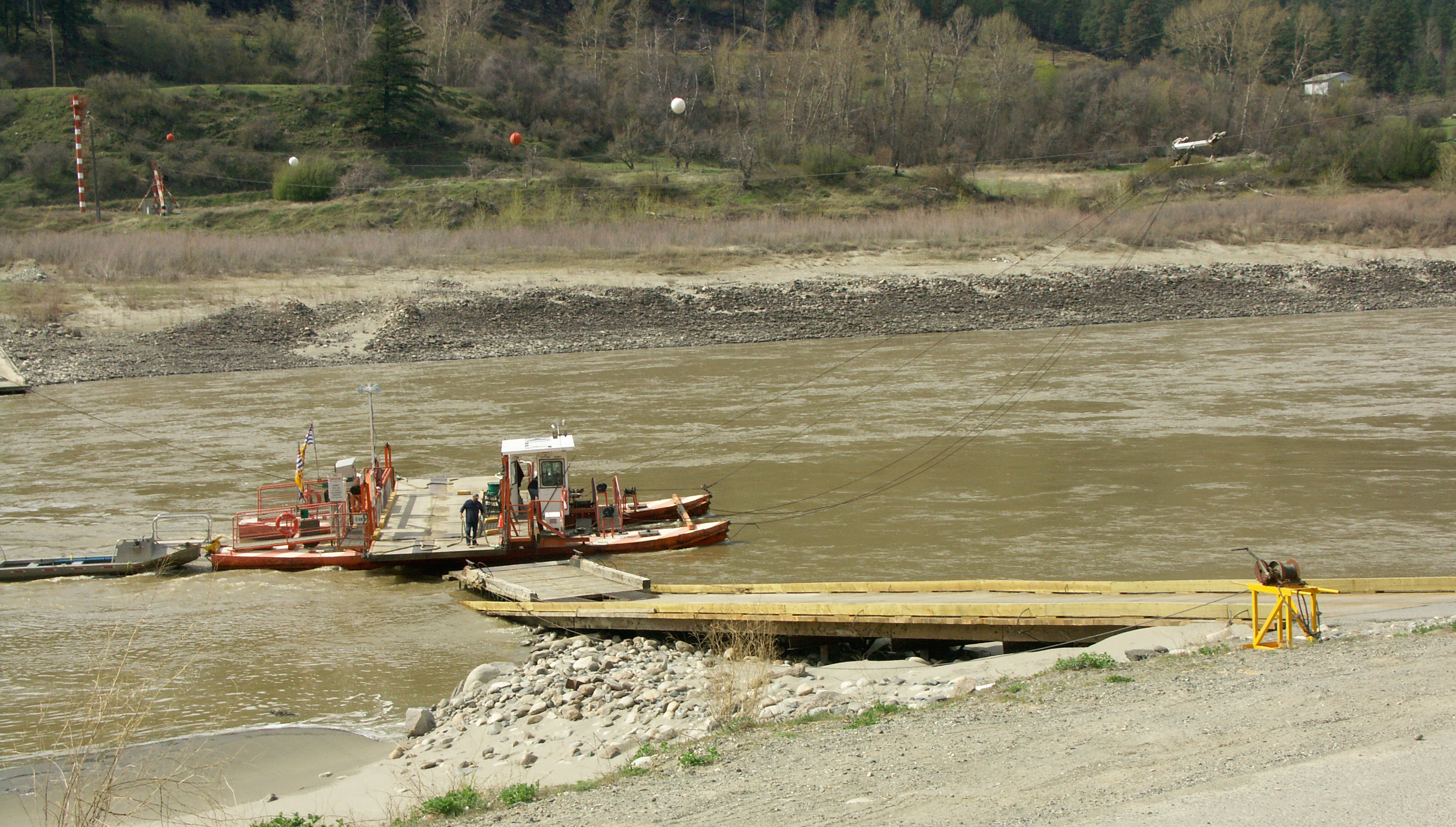
The Lytton Ferry across the Fraser River in British Columbia, Canada, is a reaction ferry using an overhead cable and traveller, visible in the upper right corner.

At one time over 30 reaction ferries crossed the rivers of British Columbia, primarily the Fraser River and the Thompson River.

Reaction Ferries that are still operating include:

- Big Bar Ferry, across the Fraser River at Big Bar, British Columbia
- Little Fort Ferry, across the Thompson River in British Columbia
- Lytton Ferry, across the Fraser River at Lytton, British Columbia
- McLure Ferry, across the Thompson River in British Columbia
- Usk Ferry, across the Skeena River in Usk, British Columbia
- Laval-sur-le-Lac–Île-Bizard Ferry, seasonally across the Rivière des Prairies from Laval-sur-le-Lac to the Île Bizard, Quebec.

=== Croatia ===
Reaction ferries cross the rivers Sava and Drava.

=== Czech Republic ===
- Dolní Žleb Ferry crosses the Elbe at Dolní Žleb near Děčín. with lower (underwater) cable
- Vrané nad Vltavou – Strnady, Vltava river before Prague, with overhead cable

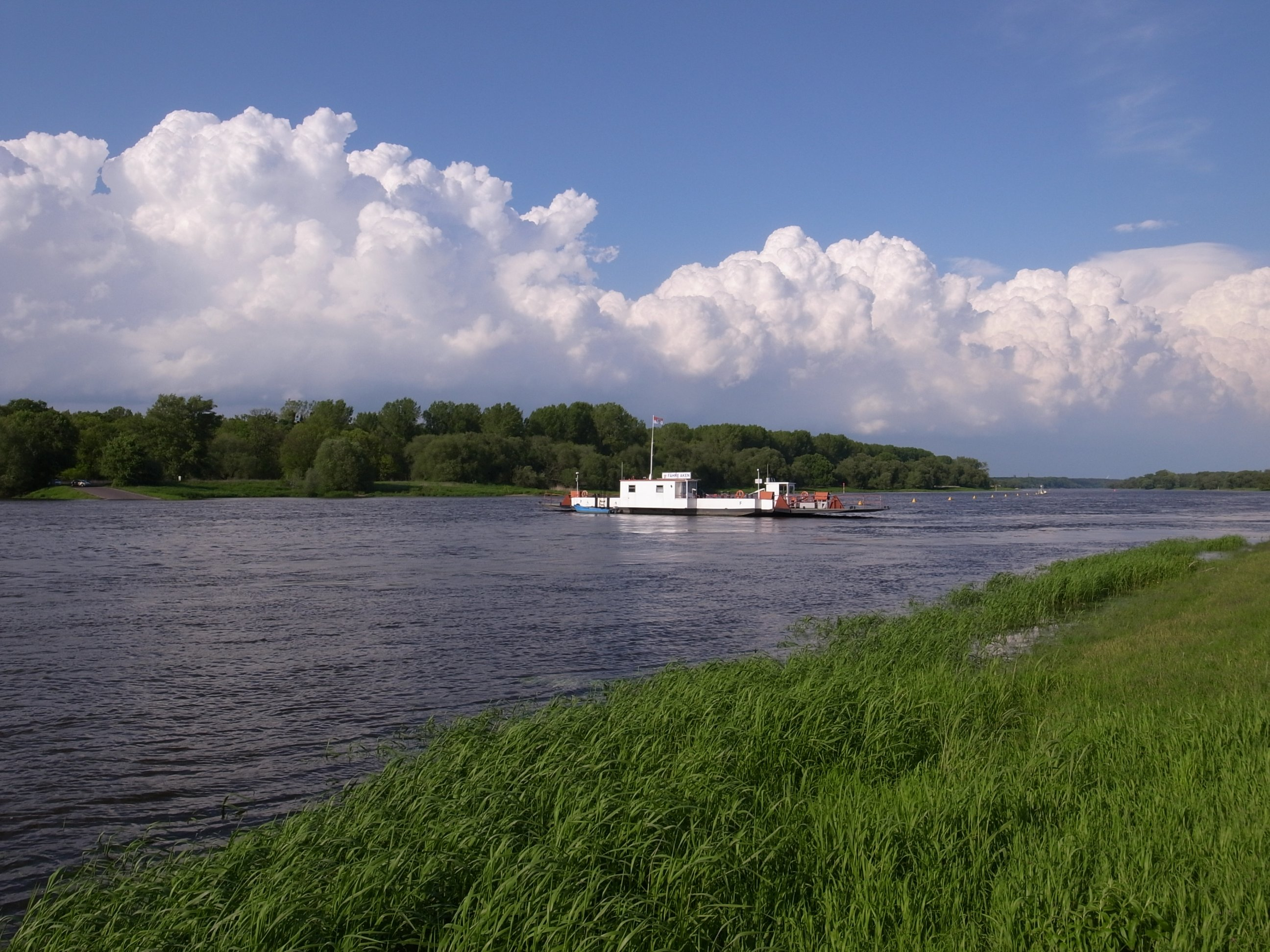
The Aken Ferry, Germany

=== Germany ===
A number of reaction ferries operate in Germany, particularly across the rivers Elbe and Weser. Between the 17th and 19th centuries, they were quite common on the Rhine. Currently operating ferries include:

- Aken Ferry, across the Elbe at Aken (Elbe) in Saxony-Anhalt
- Barby Ferry, across the Elbe at Barby in Saxony-Anhalt
- Coswig Ferry, across the Elbe at Coswig in Saxony-Anhalt
- Rathen Ferry, across the Elbe at Rathen in Saxony
- Räbel Ferry, across the Elbe between Räbel and Havelberg in Saxony-Anhalt
- Rothenburg Ferry, across the Saale at Rothenburg in Saxony-Anhalt
- Sandau Ferry, across the Elbe at Sandau in Saxony-Anhalt
- Belgern Ferry, across the Elbe at Belgern in Saxony
- Veckerhagen Ferry, across the Weser between Veckerhagen in Hesse and Hemeln in Lower Saxony
- Westerhüsen Ferry, across the Elbe at Magdeburg in Saxony-Anhalt
- Matting Ferry, across the Danube at Matting in Bavaria (Near Regensburg)

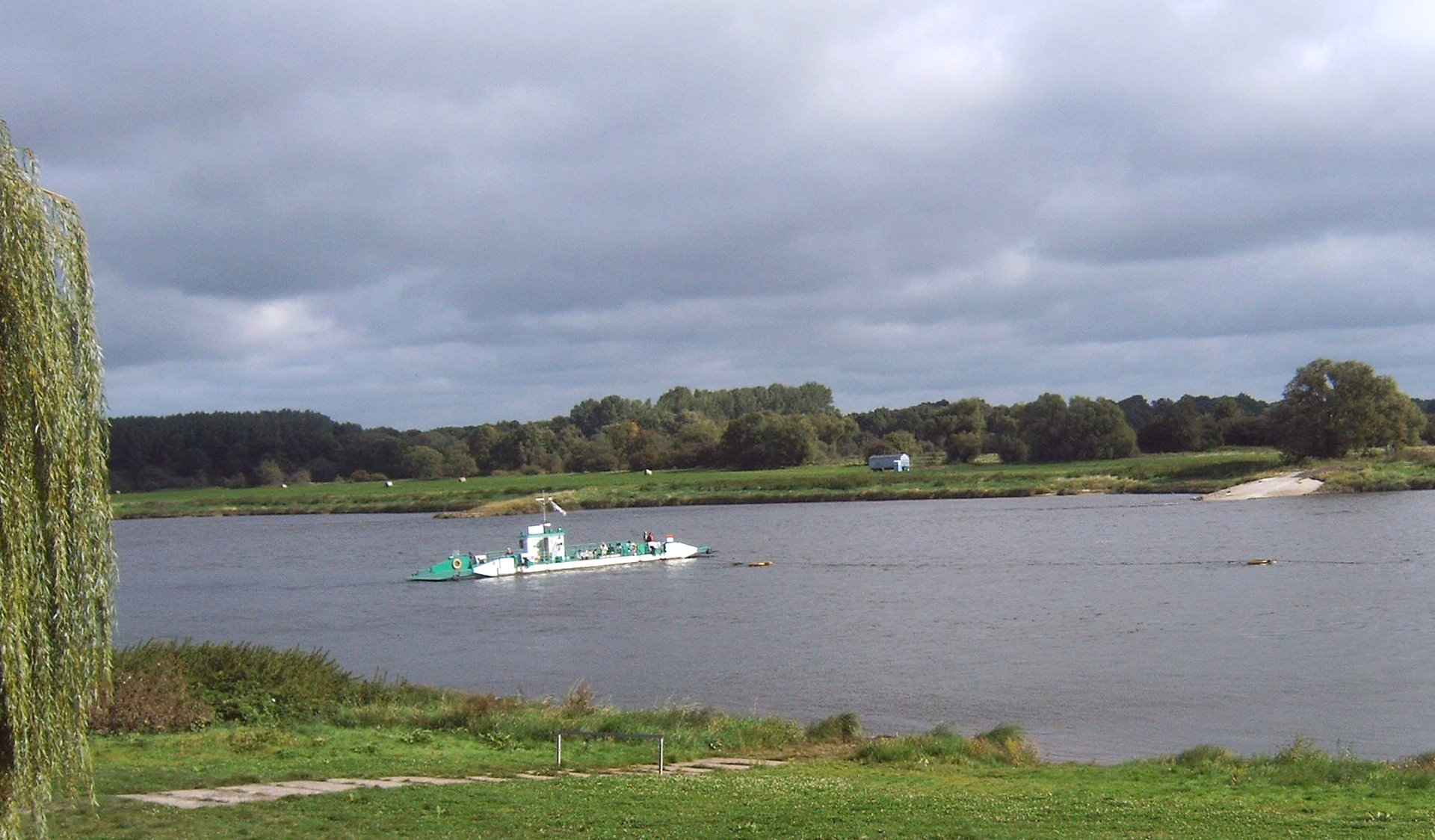
The Westerhüsen Ferry across the Elbe in Germany is a reaction ferry using a floating cable attached to a mid-channel anchorage, to the right of the boat.

=== Italy ===
The Traghetto di Leonardo is a historic reaction ferry across the Adda River at Imbersago. It is reputed to have been designed by Leonardo da Vinci.

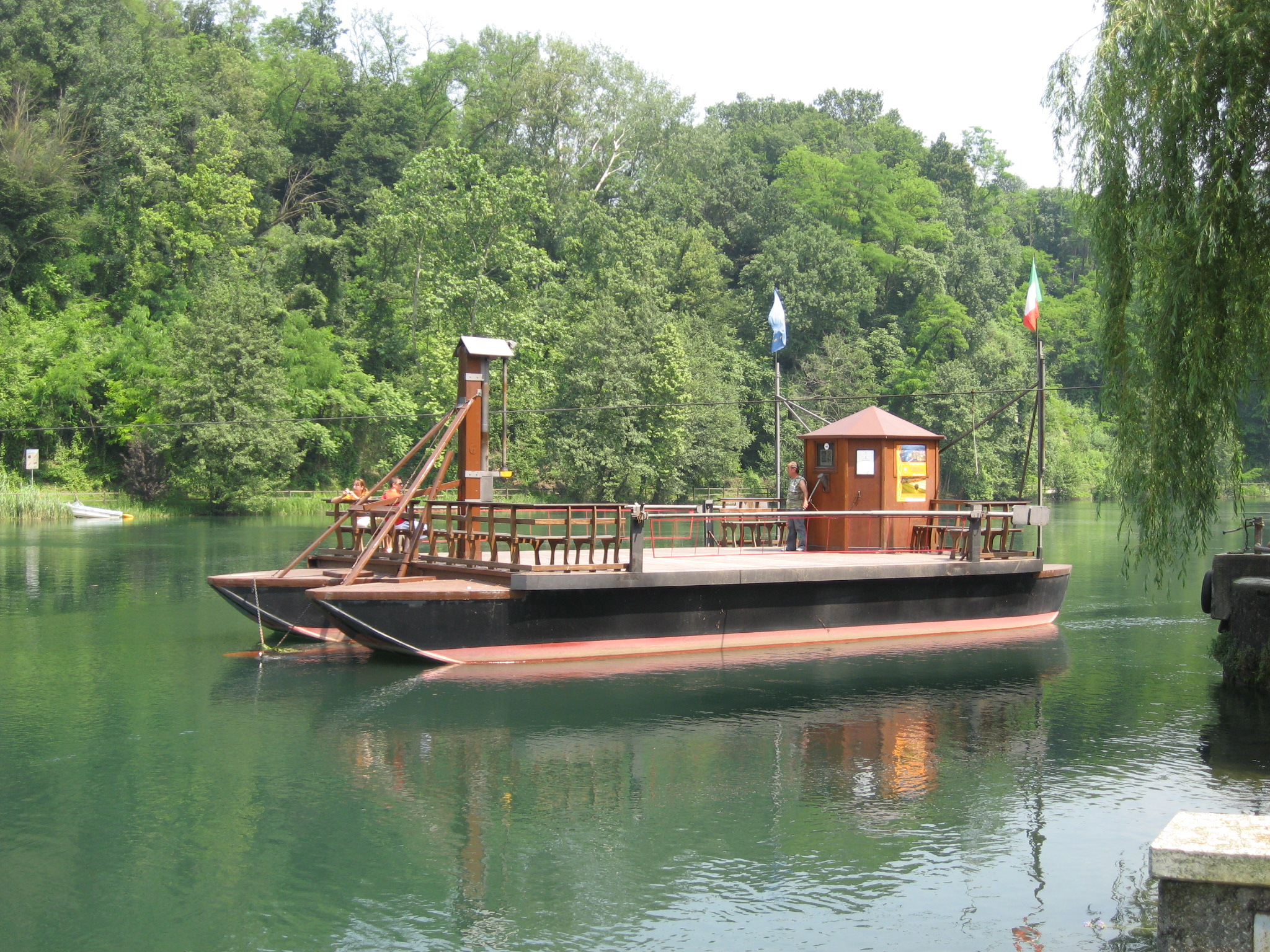
Traghetto di Leonardo, Italy

=== Lithuania ===
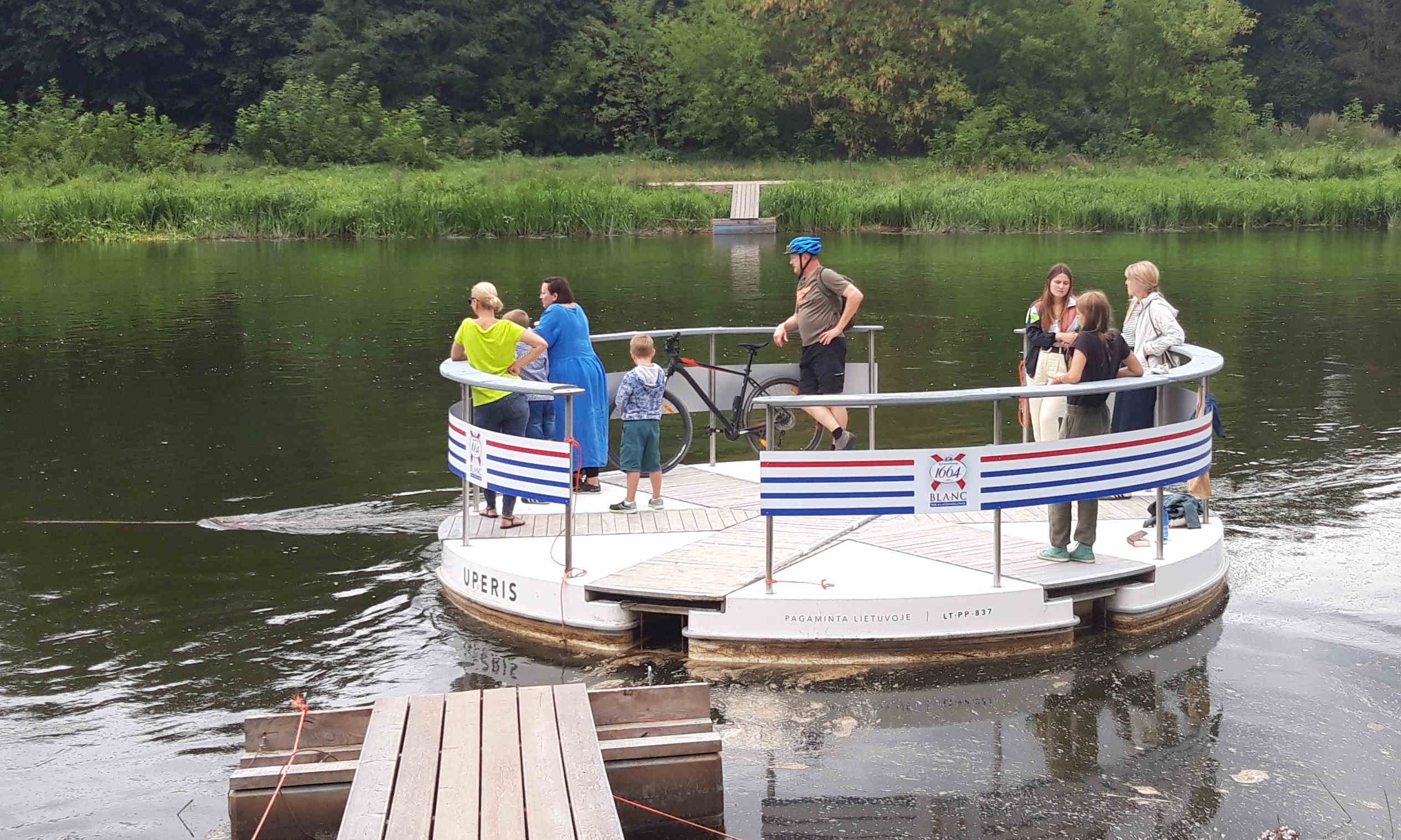
Uperis - small river ferry in Vilnius, Lithuania

- Padalių-Čiobiškio keltas across the river Neris, connecting Padaliai in Kaunas County with Čiobiškis in Vilnius County
- Uperis across the river Neris, connecting Verkių parkas with the Valakampis district of Vilnius, opened in 2018. See also

=== Netherlands ===
- Culemborg ferry
- Ferry service Doornenburg crossing the Pannerdens Kanaal

=== New Zealand ===
- Tuapeka Mouth Ferry, in Tuapeka – South Island, on the Clutha River

=== Poland ===
A number of reaction ferries operate:

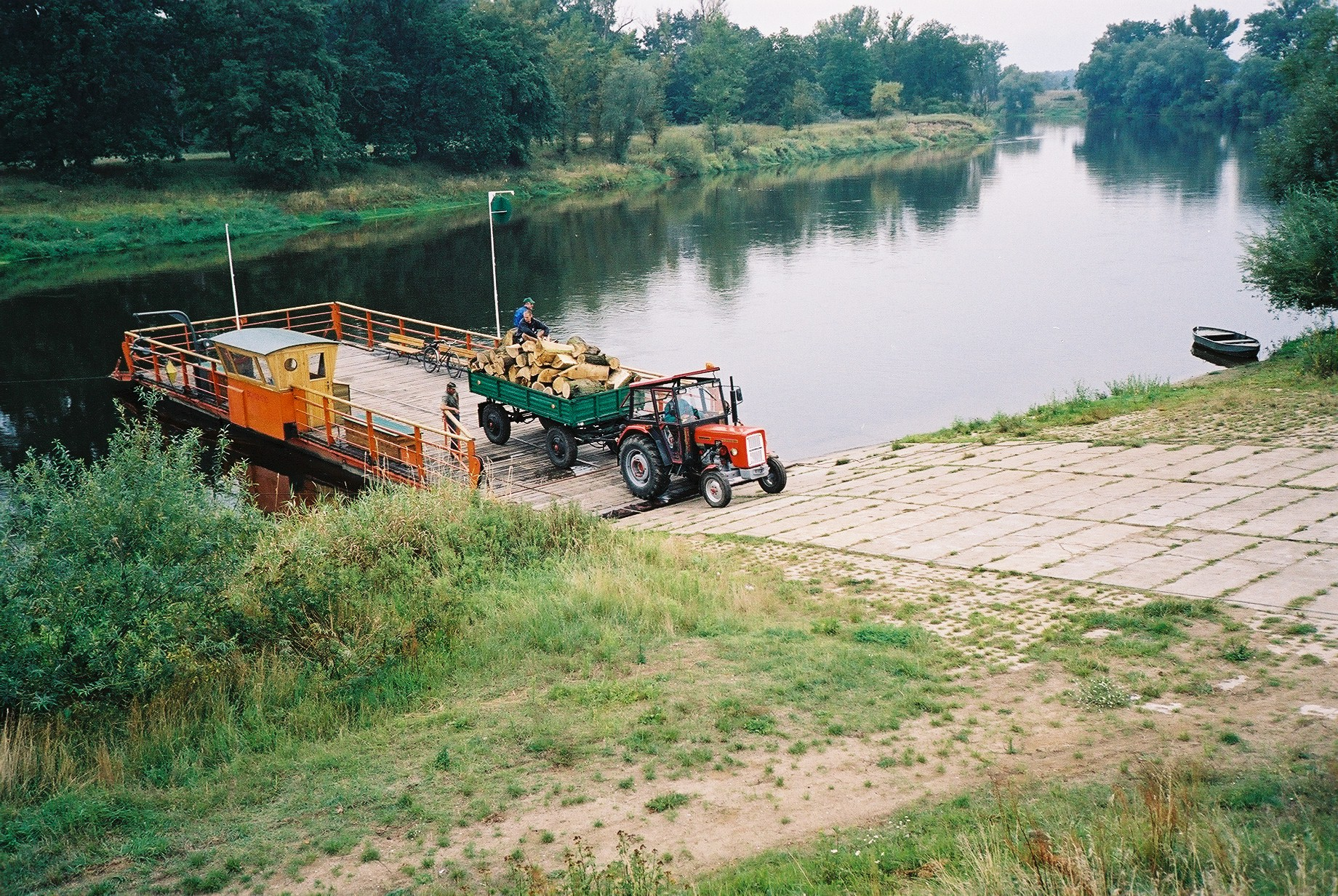
Ferry in Czeszewo, Poland (Warta river)

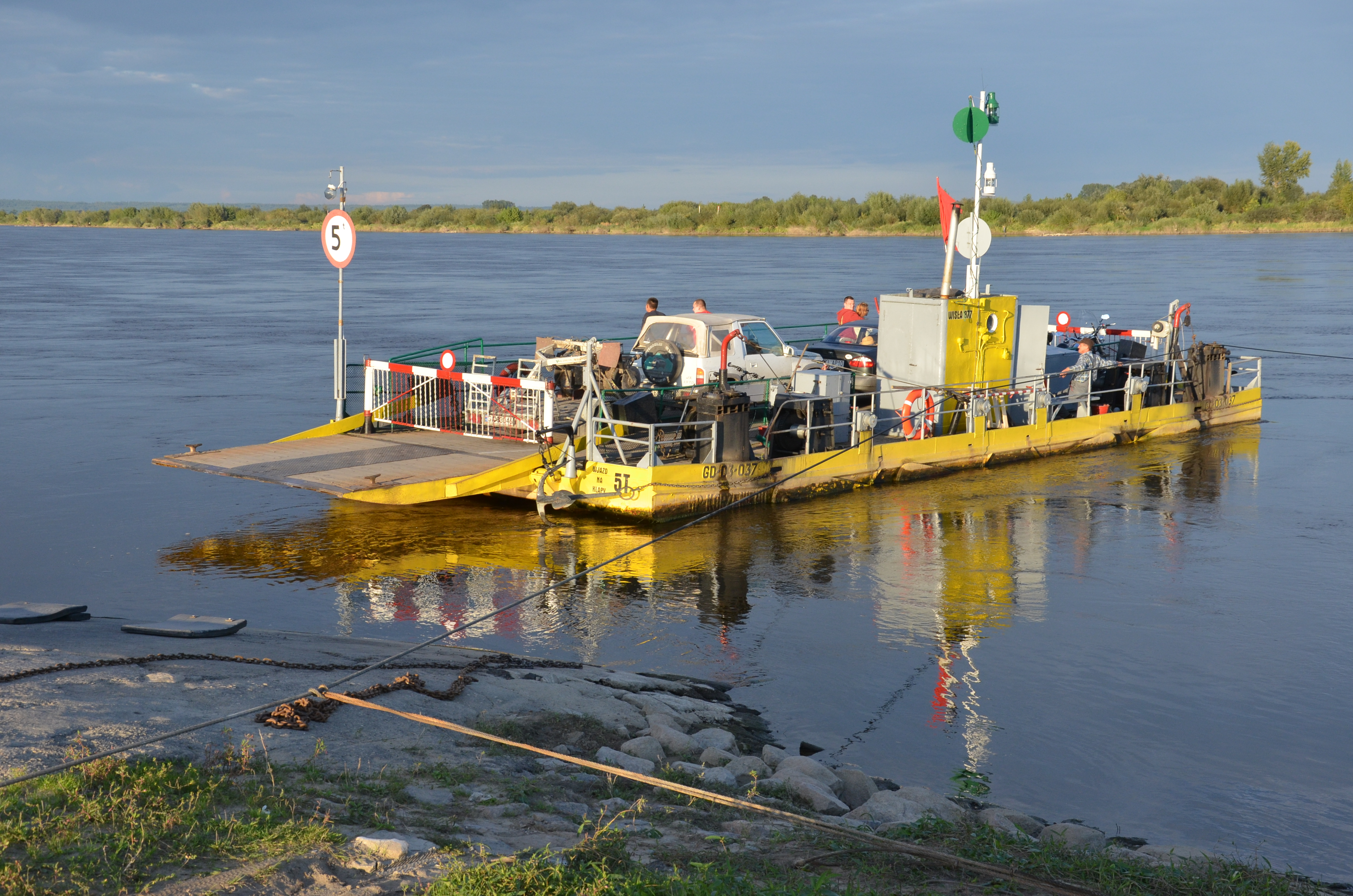
Ferry in Gniew, Poland (Vistula river)

- Biechowy Ferry, across the Warta between Biechowy and Piersk
- Borusowa Ferry, across the Vistula between Borusowa and Nowy Korczyn road no. 973
- Brody Ferry, across the Oder at Brody road no. 280
- Ciszyca Ferry, across the Vistula between Tarnobrzeg and Ciszyca road no. 758
- Czchów Ferry, across the Dunajec between Czchów and Piaski Drużków
- Czeszewo Ferry, across the Warta at Czeszewo
- Dębno Ferry, across the Warta between Dębno and Orzechowo
- Gniew Ferry, across the Vistula between Gniew and Janowo road no. 510
- Grzegorzowice Ferry, across the Oder between Grzegorzowice and Ciechowice road no. 421
- Kozubów Ferry, across the Warta at Kozubów
- Krzemienna Ferry, across the San between Krzemienna and Jabłonica Ruska
- Milsko Ferry, across the Oder between Milsko and Przewóz road no. 282
- Nozdrzec Ferry, across the San between Nozdrzec and Dąbrówka Starzeńska
- Opatowiec Ferry, across the Vistula between Opatowiec and Ujście Jezuickie
- Otfinów Ferry, across the Dunajec between Otfinów and Pasieka Otfinowska
- Pogorzelica Ferry, across the Warta between Pogorzelica and Nowa Wieś Podgórna
- Połaniec Ferry, across the Vistula between Połaniec and Gliny Małe
- Połęcko Ferry, across the Oder between Połęcko and Chlebowo road no. 138
- Pomorsko Ferry, across the Oder at Pomorsko road no. 281
- Siedliszowice Ferry, across the Dunajec between Siedliszowice and Wietrzychowice
- Sławsk Ferry, across the Warta between Sławsk and Węglewskie Holendry
- Świniary Ferry, across the Vistula between Baranów Sandomierski and Świniary Stare road no. 872
- Waki Ferry, across the Warta at Waki

=== Slovakia ===
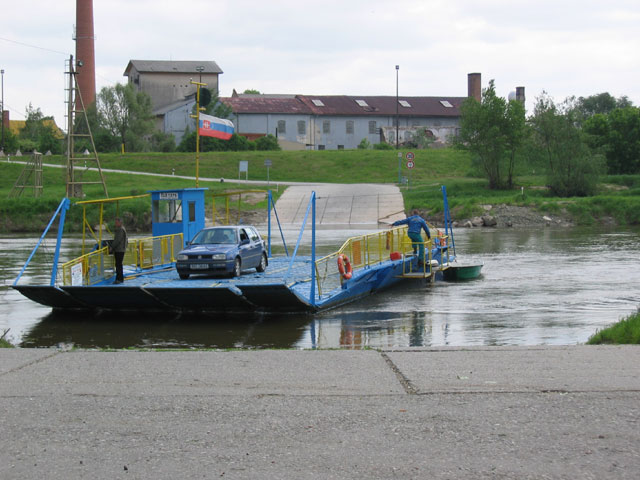
Border-crossing ferry, Záhorská Ves in Slovakia and Angern an der March in Austria

- Strečno Ferry, across the river Váh, between Strečno and Nezbudská Lúčka in Žilina District
- Vlčany-Selice Ferry, across the river Váh, between Vlčany and Selice in Šaľa District
- Záhorská Ves Ferry, across the river Morava, between Záhorská Ves, Malacky District in Slovakia and Angern an der March, Gänserndorf district in Lower Austria, Austria

=== Slovenia ===
- Ferry from Sladki Vrh to Weitersfeld an der Mur (Austria) across the Mur river is recognised as a border crossing.
- Ferry across the Mur river in Krog.
- Ferry across the Mur river in Ižakovci.
- Ferry across the Mur river in Melinci.
- Tinekov brod across the Mur river near Gornja Bistrica.

=== Spain ===
- Pas de barca de Flix on the Ebro river, in Flix in the Catalonia region of Spain.
- Pas de barca de Miravet on the Ebro river, in Miravet in the Catalonia region of Spain has been operating since the Middle Ages, and continues to use a traditional wooden ferry boat design.

=== Switzerland ===
Four passenger ferries cross the Rhine in Basel.

Three such ferries cross the Aare in Bern.

A small traditional ferry, the last on this river, crosses the Doubs.

=== United Kingdom ===
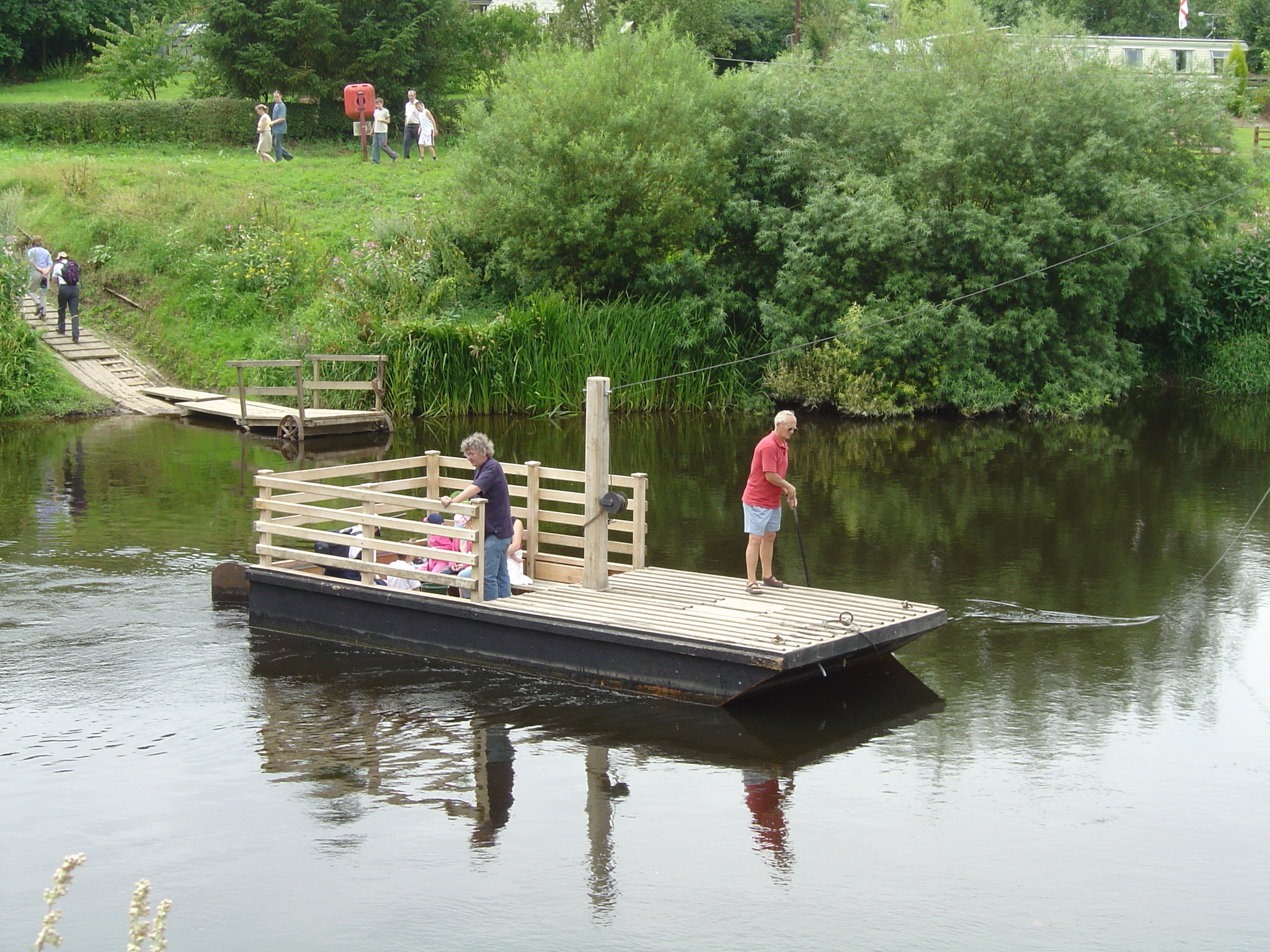
Hampton Loade Ferry, England

The Hampton Loade Ferry, which carried passengers only, crossed the River Severn at Hampton Loade in Shropshire until 2017. It was operated partly by the current and partly by punting.

=== United States ===
Several reaction ferries crossed rivers in the Ozark Mountains of the central United States during the first half of the 20th century. The Akers Ferry across the Current River near Salem, Missouri remains in operation. Menor's Ferry in Jackson Hole, Wyoming, was a dual-pontoon reaction ferry built in the 1890s and operated until 1927. A replica was constructed by the National Park Service in 2009.

== See also ==
- Cable ferry
- Chain boat
- Ferry
- Pontoon (boat)
