= Dolní Žleb Ferry =

Coordinates: 50.843183°N 14.218197°E

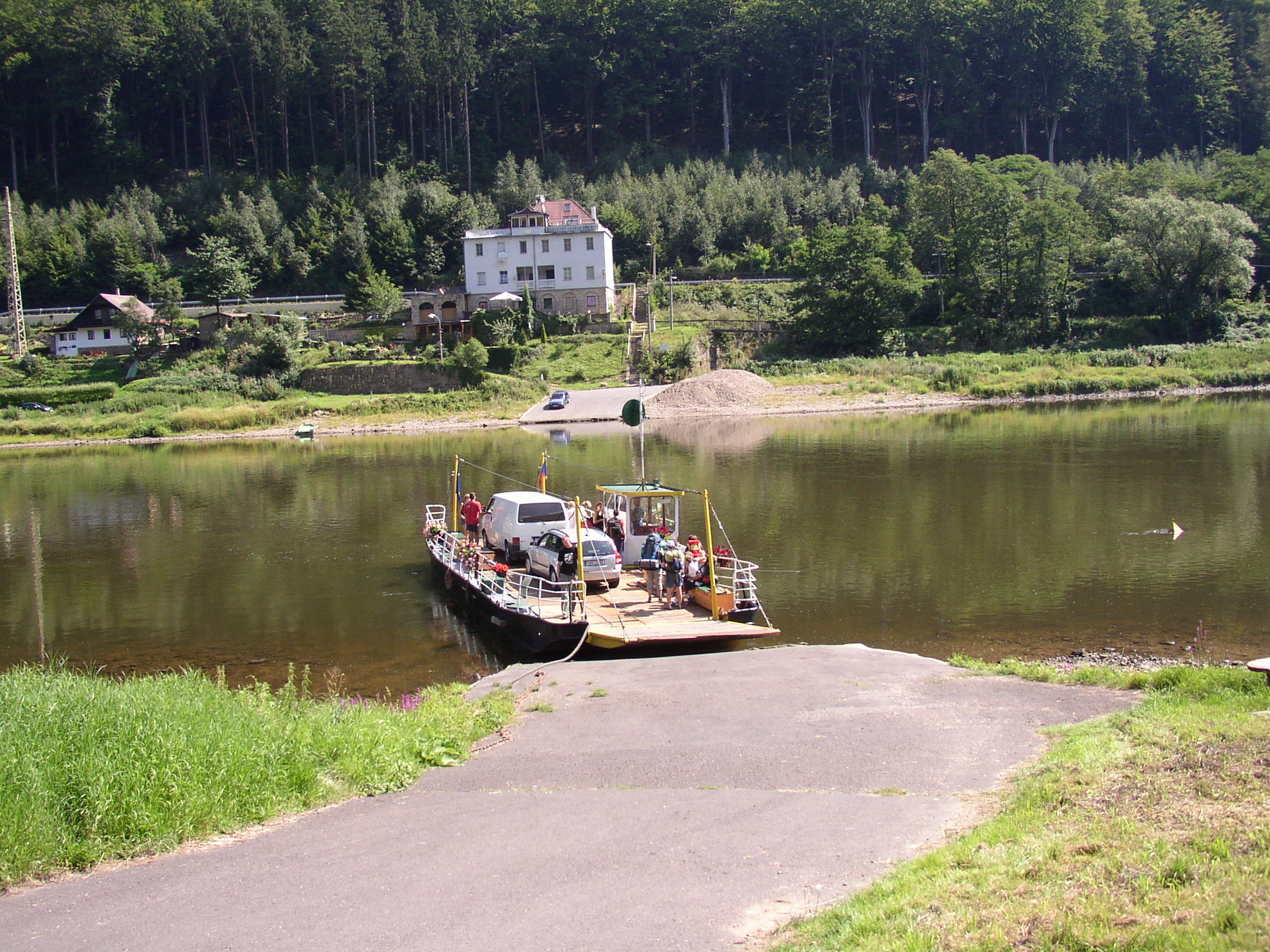
The Dolní Žleb Ferry.

The Dolní Žleb Ferry is a cable ferry across the Elbe river at Dolní Žleb in the Děčín District in the Ústí nad Labem Region of the Czech Republic.

Technically, the ferry is a reaction ferry, which is propelled by the current of the water. The ferry is attached to a floating cable which is anchored firmly in the riverbed upstream of the ferry. To operate the ferry, it is angled into the current, causing the force of the current to swing the ferry across the river on the cable.
