= Westerhüsen Ferry =

Coordinates: 52.066581°N 11.679431°E

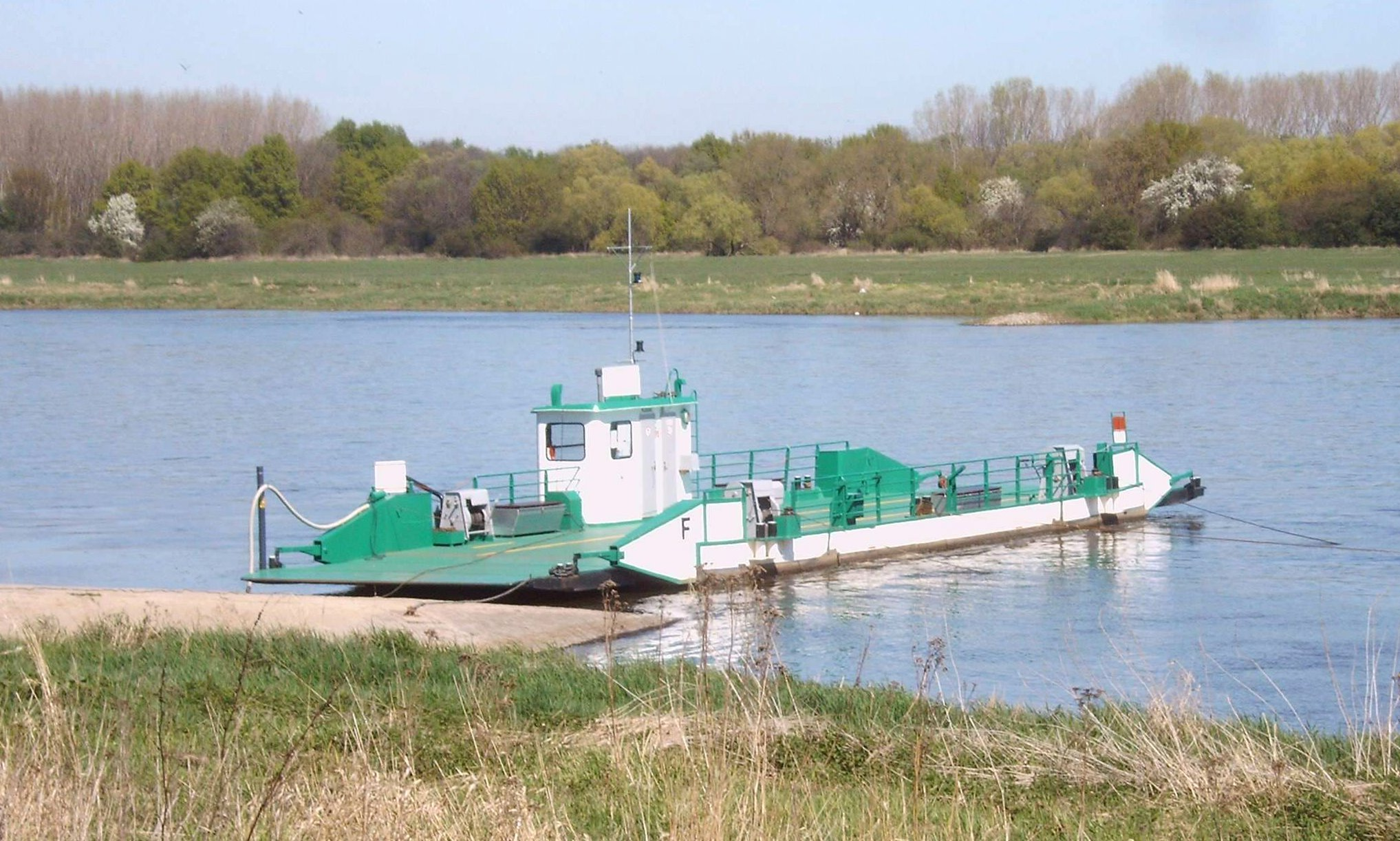
The ferry boat.

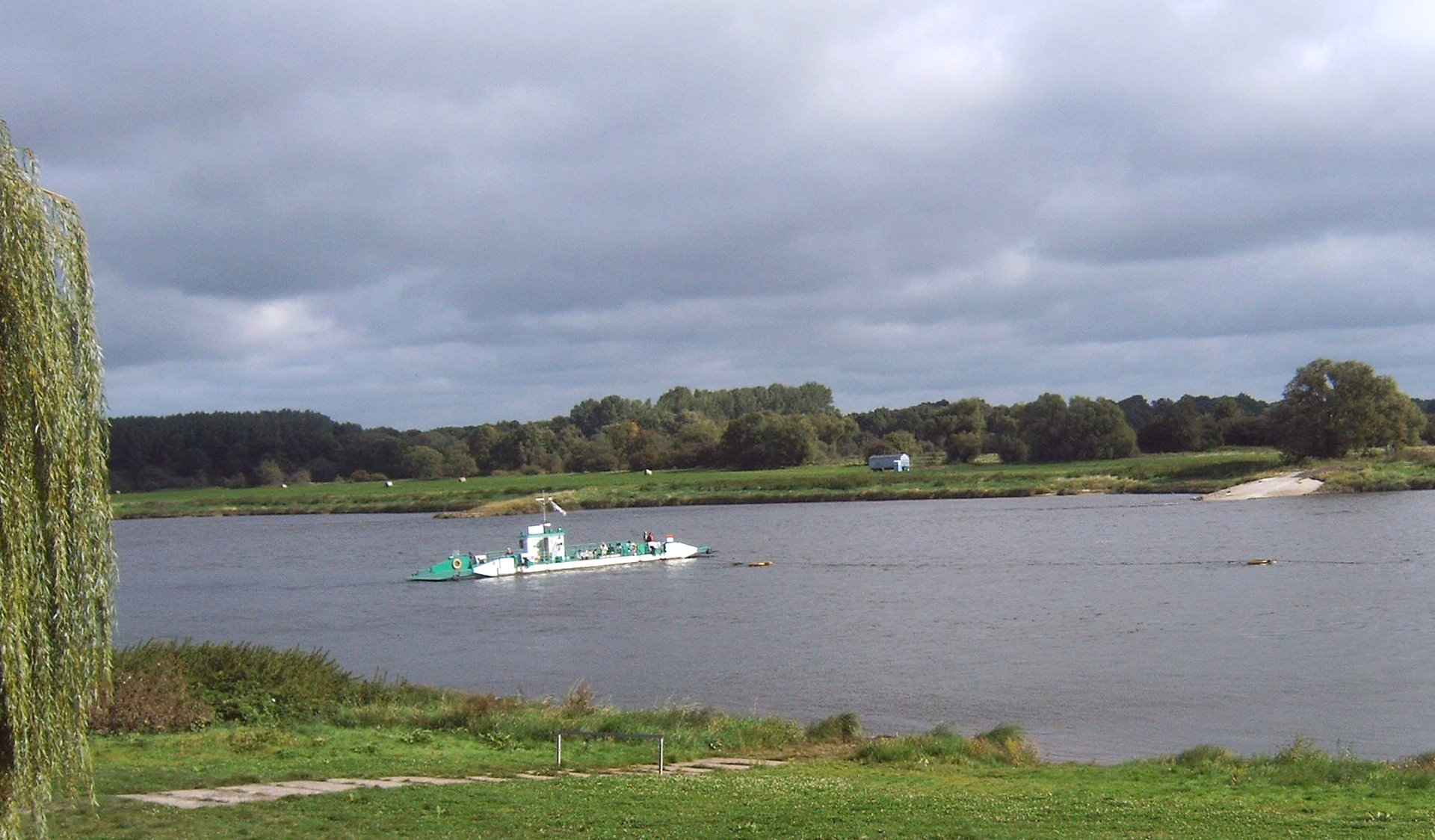
The ferry in mid-stream; the cable can be seen to its right.

The Westerhüsen Ferry is a cable ferry across the Elbe river in the city of Magdeburg in Saxony-Anhalt, Germany. The ferry links the districts of Westerhüsen, on the left bank, and Randau-Calenberge opposite.

The ferry is operated by the Magdeburger Verkehrsbetriebe (MVB). It is 27.42 metres (90.0 ft) long and 7.73 metres (25.4 ft) wide, and can carry 45 passengers or 4 cars. Because the road on the Randau side is unpaved, there is little motor vehicle traffic and the ferry is used primarily by cyclists and hikers.

Technically, the ferry is a reaction ferry, which is propelled by the current of the water. The ferry is attached to a floating cable which is anchored firmly in the riverbed upstream of the ferry. To operate the ferry, it is angled into the current, causing the force of the current to swing the ferry across the river on the cable.
