= Aken Ferry =

Cable ferry across the Elbe in Aken, Germany

Coordinates: 51.859079°N 12.056824°E

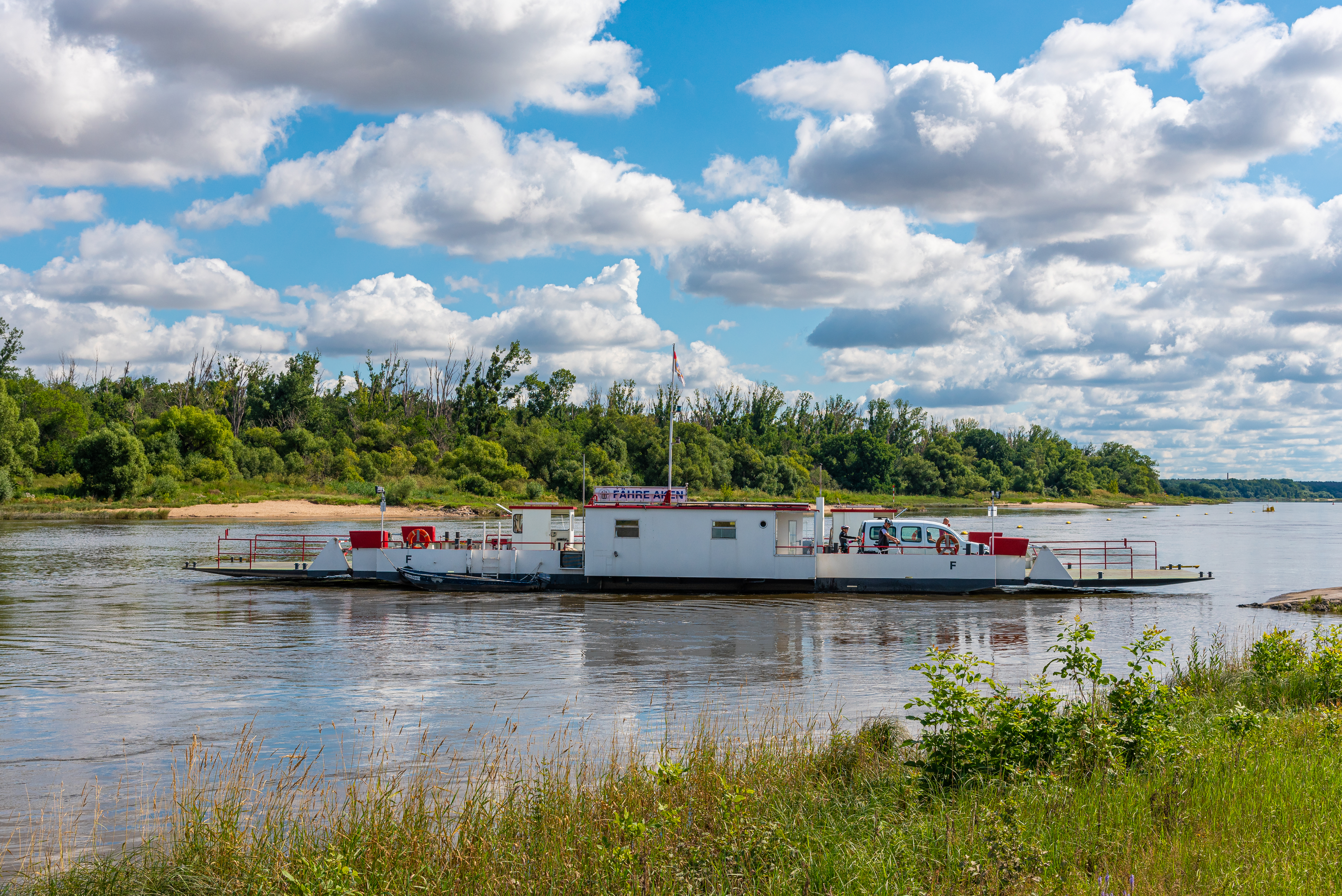
Aken Ferry

The Aken Ferry (German: Fähre Aken), also known as the Steutz Aken Ferry, is a cable ferry across the Elbe river between Aken and Steutz in Saxony-Anhalt, Germany.

Technically, the ferry is a reaction ferry, which is propelled by the current of the water. The ferry is attached to a floating cable which is anchored firmly in the riverbed upstream of the ferry. To operate the ferry, it is angled into the current, causing the force of the current to swing the ferry across the river on the cable.

A ferry was first mentioned in Aken in 1355. The current ferry vessel was built in 1997 and has a load capacity of 42 tonnes (46 tons), with the largest single load being 25 tonnes (28 tons). It can carry up to 12 cars across the Elbe in about 5 minutes.
