= Barnston Island Ferry =

Passenger and vehicle ferry in Metro Vancouver, British Columbia

Coordinates: 49.1922°N 122.7248°W

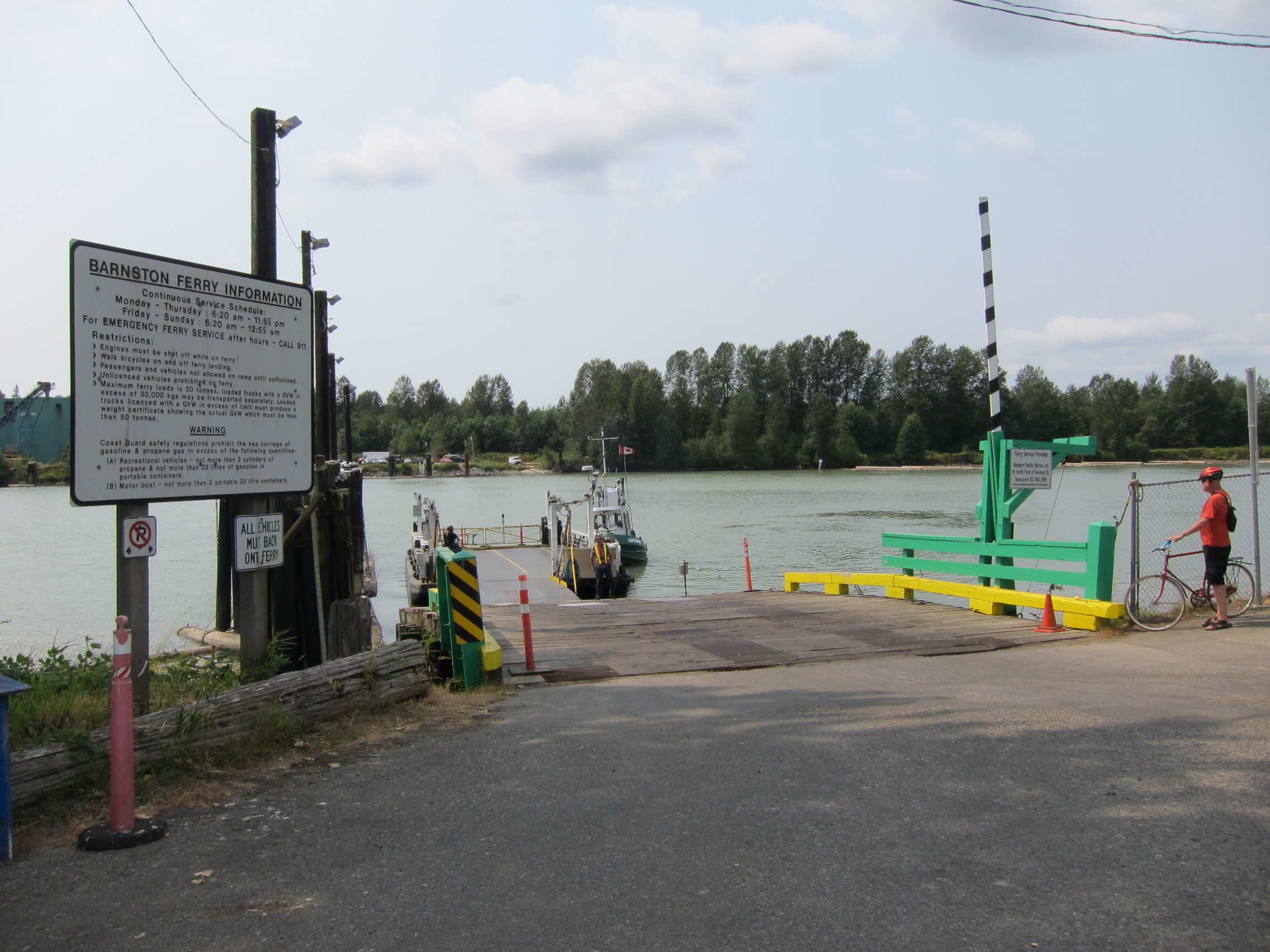
- Locale: Surrey and Barnston Island, British Columbia
- Waterway: Parson's Channel, Fraser River
- Transit type: Passenger and vehicle ferry
- Owner: BC Ministry of Transportation and Infrastructure
- Operator: Western Pacific Marine
- No. of lines: 1
- No. of vessels: 1
- No. of terminals: 2
- Website: www2.gov.bc.ca/gov/content/transportation/passenger-travel/water-travel/inland-ferries/barnston-island-ferry

The Barnston Island Ferry is a ferry that runs across Parson's Channel (on the south side of the Fraser River) between Barnston Island and Port Kells, Surrey, in Metro Vancouver.

== History ==
In 1913, the Canadian Pacific Railway withdrew steamboat services on the Fraser, leaving the island farmers with no realistic way to transport their produce to market. That year, a government wharf was built.

In response to petitions from residents, the government ferry began operating in May 1916. This cable ferry had previously been used at the Pitt River crossing. However, floating driftwood and the underwater cable snagging fishing nets made the vessel unsuitable for the new location.

The next year, the ferry underwent a complete overhaul. Services were suspended during the spring high water for six weeks, and during winter when ice floes were hazardous, which proved inconvenient for the transportation of milk, grain, hay and potatoes.

Location of the Barnston Island Ferry in Metro Vancouver

=== 1918 upgrade ===
In 1918, the introduction of a gasoline boat, which pushed a small scow, enabled the carrying of passengers and limited produce.

=== 1921 upgrade ===
A larger gasoline launch was purchased in 1921. Substandard road conditions meant this 12-metre (38 ft) former fishing boat circumnavigated the island to load milk churns at various collection points. By 1927, the boat, which ran continuously during peak periods, was becoming old and inadequate.

=== 1930 upgrade ===
In 1930, the boat was replaced and a larger barge built. The 9.8-metre (32 ft) tug pushed the 11-metre (36 ft) barge, which could carry two vehicles. This beginning of vehicle transportation reflected increased vehicle numbers on the island and improved roads. After leaving the barge at the slipway, the tug continued to make a milk trip around the island. By 1933, travel was free, but the year tolls were removed is unclear.

When the river froze solid during winter, produce could be skated across the ice. In the 1936–37 winter, the ferry was refloated after floating ice had rammed it against the island slip. While the ferry was being overhauled, the upgrade service was limited to foot traffic. That September, while backing a car at the mainland slip, a ferry worker drove into the river. After struggling to exit the submerged vehicle, he finally surfaced.

=== 1940 upgrade ===
In 1940, the new 11-metre (35 ft) wooden Barnston Island tug replaced the obsolete vessel. That year, the circumnavigation of the island ceased. Operational hours were 7am to 7pm.

In 1944, a new 4.9-by-16.5-metre (16 by 54 ft) two-truck capacity barge arrived, and an infill above the high-water mark shortened the island landing ramp. In 1945–46, the island landing ramp received minor repairs and a seven-pile dolphin across the river was renewed.

While the fast-flowing river rapidly rose during the Fraser flood of 1948, 35 families, 500 head of cattle, 300 sheep, and numerous poultry, pigs and horses were evacuated on ferry barges adapted with additional railings to corral the livestock. Bypassing the ferry slip then 4.6 metres (15 ft) below water, the B.C. Packers boat Salmon Prince also assisted in the evacuation. In 1949, a freshet took out the island landing ramp, forcing the ferry to land on the beach for months.

At least until the 1950s, a truck would cross on the ferry and pick up the milk churns daily from around the island for delivery to Dairyland. In 1951, the upended wreck of a ferry that sank years previously was destroyed with explosives.

=== 1954 upgrade ===
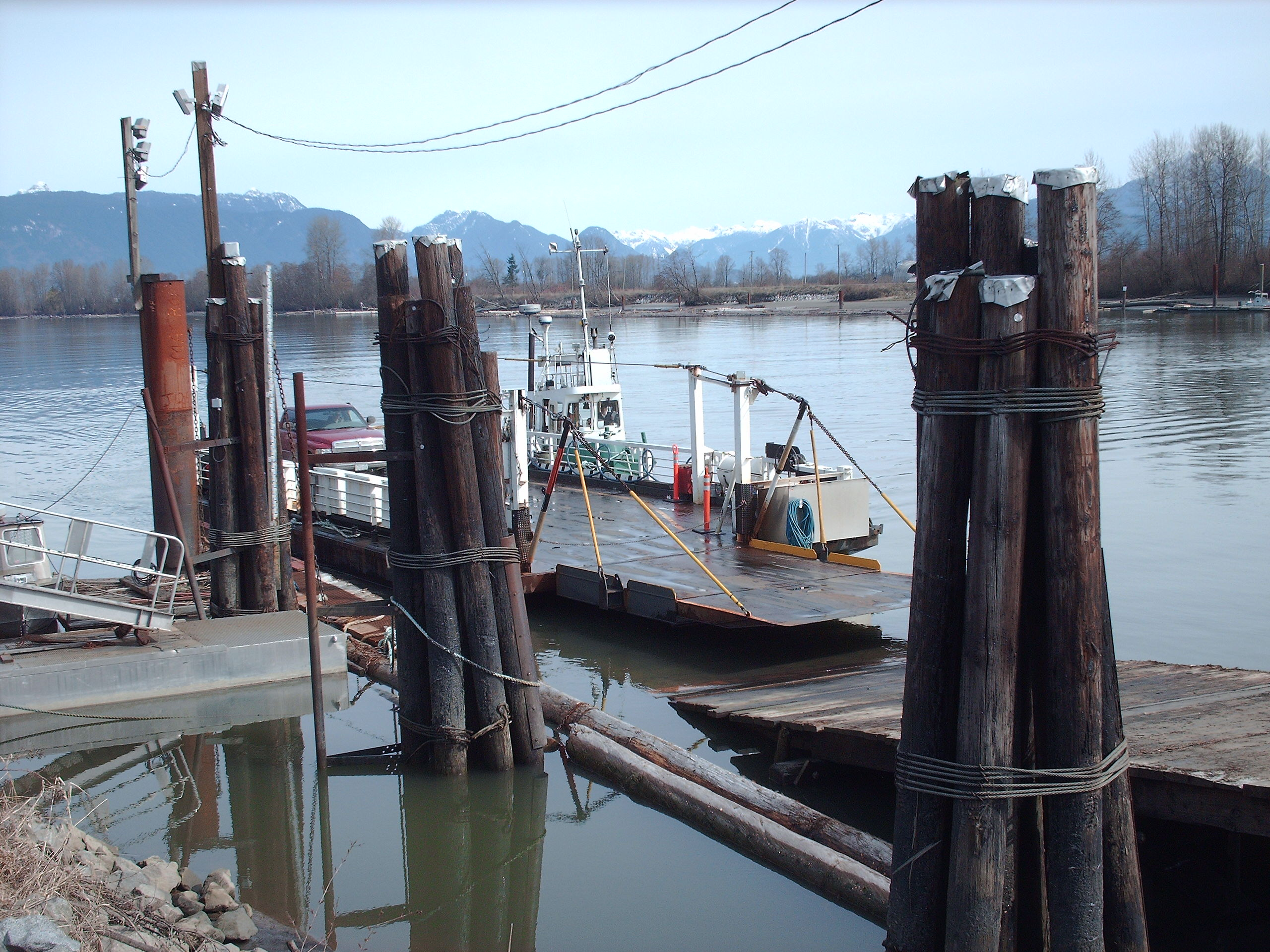
Ferry with Barnston Island in background, 2005

In 1954, a new 18 metres (60 ft) steel barge was built. The Barnston Island No. 3 had a three-vehicle capacity.

Ferry captain since 1930, Len Thompson retired in 1962.

=== 1963 upgrade ===
In 1963, the Barnston Island No. 1, a 20-metre (66 ft) steel tug, replaced the wooden one, and the island landing was rebuilt.

In 1984, Western Pacific Marine won the contract to manage the service. The company started operating the service on April 1 of that year.

=== Later vessels ===
The operator has used a series of similar tugs on the route, which included the Centurion V in the early 1990s.

After the 2009 withdrawal of the Albion Ferry, the Barnston Island Ferry, the Lytton Ferry and the Big Bar Ferry became the last remaining free inland ferries on the Fraser. Residents have sought a bridge link for over one hundred years.

Propelled by an attached tugboat, the barge can carry up to 6 vehicles and 52 passengers, but when 6 vehicles are aboard, the residual capacity is 28 passengers. The crossing time is usually five minutes. The ferry terminal landing is accessed from British Columbia Highway 1 by taking exit 53 into Port Kells, Surrey and proceeding to the end of 104th Avenue.

The ferry operates under private contract with the British Columbia Ministry of Transportation and is free of tolls, as are all inland ferries in British Columbia. The operation is Transport Canada Marine Safety inspected annually and all crew members are Transport Canada certified. The crossing operates on-demand from 6:15 am to 11:55 pm (12:55 am weekends). River conditions may interrupt the service. The school bus has boarding priority on school days.

== Patronage ==
Recent years:

Annual automobile equivalents
View source data.
Annual passengers
View source data.
Prior to 1960

Patronage (1922–1947)^{a} (Double these numbers for single trips)
Type	Year	Page	Round Trips	Motor Vehicles	Horse- drawn rigs	Passengers	Freight (tons)	Livestock	Total Vehicles
Gas boat	1922–23	C40	1,900		12	2,669	32		12
Gas boat	1923–24	L38	1,307		8	3,919	63		8
Gas boat	1924–25	Q38	1,443			4,796	183		
Gas boat	1925–26	Q38	1,789			5,152	196	63	
Gas boat	1926–27	P46	2,744			7,921	175	73	
Gas boat	1927–28	U52	2,846	39		10,847	145	32	39
Gas boat	1928–29	S60	963		32	8,113	67	866	32
Gas boat	1929–30	T74	3,496			12,564	210	665	
Gas boat & scow	1930–31	G50	6.333	2,853	38	14,287	1,871	194	2,891
Gas boat & scow	1931–32	M40	4,927	2,999	111	8,897	1,036	102	3,110
Gas boat & scow	1932–33	Q36	4,500	3,658	108	9,307	730	484	3,766
Gas boat & scow	1933–34	O32	5,671	4,538	64	11,045	1,266	295	4,602
Gas boat & scow	1934–35	T37	6,278	5,876	76	13,190	1,738	646	5,952
Gas boat & scow	1935–36	I44	7,267	7,463	97	15,924	2,308	507	7,560
Gas boat & scow	1936–37	X52	7,382	8,131	84	16,290	3,553	462	8,215
Gas boat & scow	1937–38	X55	7,591	8,041	58	16,627	2,344	371	8,099
Gas boat & scow	1938–39	Z56	7,496	8,508	81	16,824	2,526	310	8,589
Gas boat & scow	1939–40	P56	7,453	7,930	141	14,566	2,005	512	8,071
Gas boat & scow	1940–41	O47	7,540	7,977	34	13,716	2,279	498	8,011
Gas boat & scow	1941–42	T52	7,442	10,261	46	9,501	2,270	383	10,307
Gas boat & scow	1942–43	O52	6,567	12,605	22	6,688	2,540	452	12,627
Gas boat & scow	1943–44	Q52	6,010	6,630	19	8,330	2,814	583	6,649
Gas boat & scow	1944–45	O51	6,580	12,173	10	8,112	2,731	759	12,183
Gas boat & scow	1945–46	Q58	6,618	11,544	10	8,424	3,419	504	11,554
Gas boat & scow	1946–47	P47	5,568	6,649	7	7,692	2,338	237	6,656

^a. Extracted from the respective Ministry of Public Works annual reports.

Patronage (1947–1960)^{b} (Double these numbers for single trips)
Type	Year	Page	Round Trips	Passenger Autos	Passengers (Drivers excluded)	Trucks	Trailers & Semis	Buses	Motor- cycles	Horse- drawn rigs	Freight (tons)	Livestock	Misc. Veh.	Total Vehicles
Gas boat & scow	1947–48	N56	10,682	6,459	19,285	7,825	35		300		5,441	619		14,619
Gas boat & scow	1948–49	O60	11,689	6,821	22,031	9,042	56	8	231	1	6,354	1,855		16,159
Gas boat & scow	1949–50	Q74	11,656	7,789	23,669	8.960	4	1	256		6,355	662		17,010
Gas boat & scow	1950–51	N77	12,533	10,225	24,842	8.949	30	15	432	3	6,918	500		19,654
Gas boat & scow	1951–52	P83	14,203	11,923	29,941	10,688	118		9	5	9,271	575	11	22,754
Tug & scow	1952–53	O85	14,736	10,516	33,488	13,132	201		6		7,936	617	24	23,879
Tug & scow	1953–54	M93	15,493	13,259	39,197	12,012	172		10		7,326	694	48	25,501
Tug & scow	1954–55	K95	16,540	13,606	38,941	12,961	107		4		7,646	728	35	26,713
Tug & scow	1955–56	N88	17,052	16,908	38,421	11,162	159		12			874	28	28,269
Tug & scow	1956–57	J100	16,366	16,200	36,064	11,373	127		6			908	32	27,738
Tug & scow	1957–58	G53	18,454	18,536	54,751	14,487	198	13	60			768	6	33,300
Tug & scow	1958–59	G36	17,654	17,477	55,512	14,324	235	440	73			701	47	32,596
Tug & scow	1959–60	F41	19,704	19,407	64,727	20,014	162	918	95	6		567	60	40,662

^b. Extracted from the respective Ministry of Public Works or Ministry of Highways annual reports.

== See also ==
- List of crossings of the Fraser River
- List of inland ferries in British Columbia
