= Usk, British Columbia =

Usk
- Hamlet
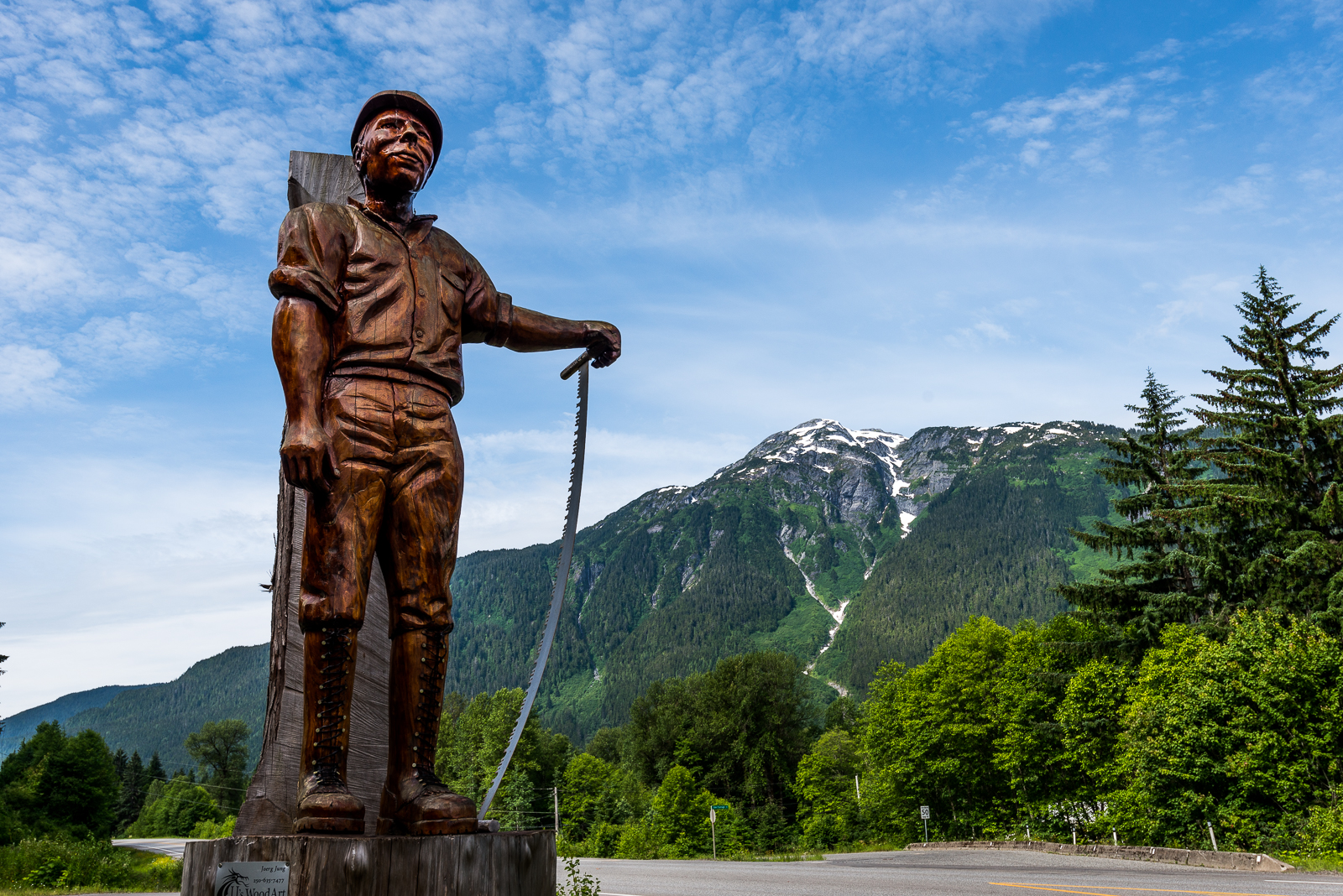
- Carving of a lumberjack, Usk, 2017

- Location of Usk in British Columbia
- Coordinates: 54°37′59″N 128°25′05″W
- Country: Canada
- Province: British Columbia
- Region: Skeena
- Regional district: Kitimat–Stikine
- Time zone: UTC−07:00 (PT)
- Area codes: 250, 778, 236, & 672
- Highways: Highway 16 (TCH)
- Waterways: Skeena River

Usk is an unincorporated community in the Skeena region of west central British Columbia, Canada. The Usk Ferry connects the two parts of the hamlet that straddle the Skeena River. Just off BC Highway 16, the locality is by road about 182 kilometres (113 mi) west of Smithers and 23 kilometres (14 mi) northeast of Terrace.

== Name origin ==
Dominic Daniel Joseph Dempsey Loftus, who was the superintendent for the Grand Trunk Pacific Railway (GTP) tracklaying in the area, assigned the name. He is believed to have been originally from the River Usk area of Wales. The earliest newspaper mention of the name is July 1912.

Interestingly, the Kettle Valley Railway chose the same name for a new station a few years later, before a change to Jellicoe after a couple of years.

== Railway ==
Where Usk is defined as about mile 119.2 westward, the railway tunnels of the Kitselas Canyon are at miles 121.9 (377 metres (1,238 ft)), 122.1 (61 metres (201 ft)), 122.3 (169 metres (555 ft)), and 122.8 (284 metres (931 ft)).

In mid-January 1912, the temporary tunnel terminal ceased to exist when the GTP rail head from Prince Rupert advanced through the tunnels, then past mile 107 (Usk), reaching mile 115 eastward by month end.

In 1912, the standard-design Plan 100‐152 (Bohi's Type E) station building was erected. A converted bunkhouse was the later replacement.

During the 1936 flood, about 2 metres (7 ft) of water covered the Canadian National Railway (CN) track and only the upper part of the station was visible. Nearly 91 metres (300 ft) of railway track was washed out.

In 1948, five cars of a westbound passenger train derailed.

In 1951, a fire totally destroyed the rail bridge about 2.4 kilometres (1.5 mi) west.

In 1974, the rail bridge washed out. Months later, a worker was fatally crushed by logs while unloading a boxcar.

In 1976, a freight train wreck occurred one mile west.

Hegstad, about 3.1 kilometres (1.9 mi) east of Usk, is a siding built in 1983.

In 1995, the little white passenger waiting room closed, and the building was advertised for sale the following year.

A trackside signpost marks the Usk flag stop for Via Rail's Jasper–Prince Rupert train.

Train Timetables (Regular stop or Flag stop)
	Mile	1914	1920	1932	1943	1950	1960	1971	1980	1990	2000	2010	2020
Terrace	1663.3	Reg.	Reg.	Reg.	Reg.	Reg.	Reg.	Reg.	Reg.	Reg.	Reg.	Reg.	Reg.
Dobies	1659.0		Flag	Flag	Flag	Flag							
Vanarsdol	1657.7	Flag	Flag	Flag									
Kitselas	1657.7				Flag	Flag	Flag	Flag					
Mileage 125.7	1657.2								Flag				
Usk	1650.7	Flag	Flag	Reg.	Both	Reg.	Reg.	Flag	Flag	Flag	Flag	Flag	Flag
Royal Lumber	1646.4		Flag										
Pitman	1644.0	Flag	Flag	Flag	Flag	Flag	Flag	Flag	Flag				
Pacific	1638.5	Reg.	Reg.	Reg.	Reg.	Reg.	Flag	Flag	Flag	Flag	Flag	Flag	Flag
Dorreen	1632.4	Flag	Flag	Flag	Flag	Flag	Flag	Flag	Flag	Flag	Flag	Flag	Flag

== Earlier community ==
Prior to the railway, the Usk area was not permanently settled. Many residents to the southwest, who no longer had a riverboat service, gravitated to Usk, the nearest station. Dick Lowrie obtained a 65-hectare (160-acre) pre-emption, part of which later became the townsite.

In 1915, a government telegraph office opened. Around that time, a store and small hotel existed on the northwest shore. James L. Bethurem was the inaugural postmaster 1916–1947. He also was the mining recorder and ran the general store. In 1918, the school opened.

In 1921, the townsite was surveyed. The existence of a jail indicates a police post. In 1923, a two-room schoolhouse was erected on the bench north of the townsite. About this time, the Shackleton Hotel was established. An upgrading of transmission lines led to the closure of the government telegraph office in 1924.

An enlargement to the general store created a public hall on the upper level in 1925. The school lost half of the pupils in 1927, when Hanson Lumber and Timber transferred its Usk and Terrace operations to Smithers. In the late 1920s, a church was built for use by any Christian denomination.

A fire in 1931 destroyed the power plant, woodshed and tool house of the Shackleton Hotel. Neither hotel appears to have operated much beyond this time. The 1936 flood breached the railway embankment, which separated the town from river, sending a 4-to-5-metre (13 to 16 ft) flow through the main streets. Water damage destroyed the Marsh Memorial Church. Although not as severe as 1936, the 1948 flood prompted a mass evacuation to higher ground.

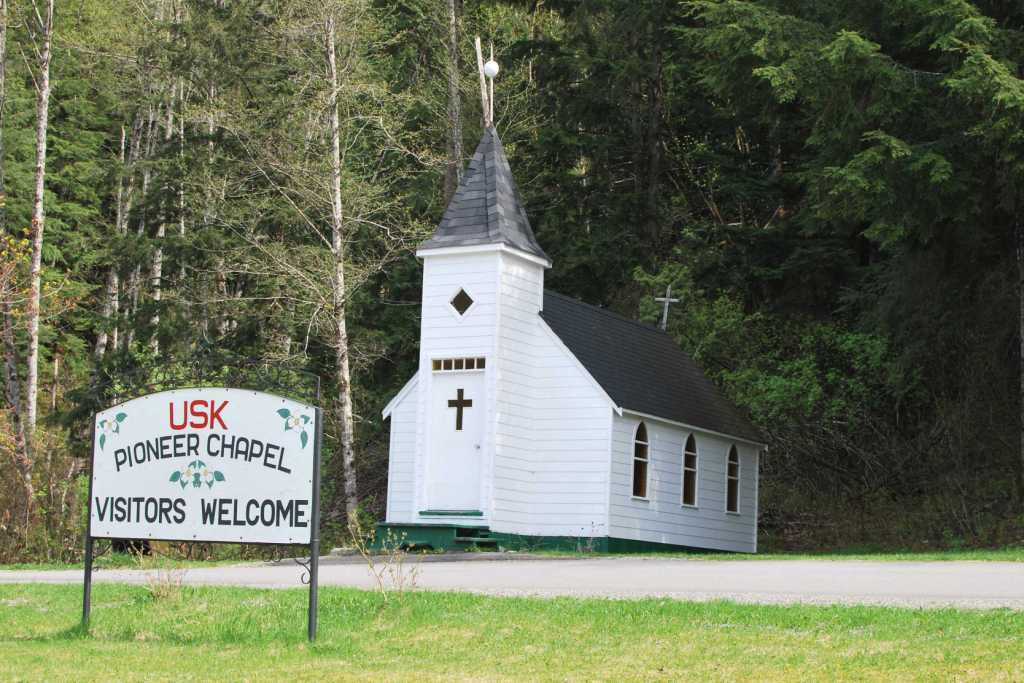
Usk Pioneer Chapel, Usk, 2011.

In 1950, the population was about 70. The next year, a fire totally destroyed the general store. During the 1950s, the place was often referred to in humorous contexts owing to its small size, not unlike Spuzzum.

In 1961, the school closed. The general store operated into the early 1960s. In 1967, the post office closed, a fire destroyed the gas station, and Terrace Christian Reformed Church built the Usk Pioneer Chapel as a one-third replica of the Marsh Memorial Church, which had stood across the river.

In the late 1980s, the population was 128.

The community hall remained in use until the early 1990s.

== Forestry ==
In the mid-1910s, a sawmill existed on the northwest shore. In the late 1910s, two more sawmills were established.

In 1920 two mills closed. An aerial tramway spanning the river carried lumber from the main sawmill on the southeast side. In 1923, this mill moved about one mile eastward but closed in the late 1920s.

In 1941 W.R. Adams and J. Lee Bethurem erected a sawmill which burned down the following year. The rebuilt mill ultimately became the Adams Lumber Co but closed in 1959, when a highway realignment required the property.

In 2014, a memorial to loggers, who lost their lives while working in the forests, was dedicated. The carving of a logger stands in the foreground.

== Mining ==
The discovery of gold in the Cordillera claims on Kitselas Mountain attracted a great influx of prospectors. From 1914, the Cordillera was shipping out ore. After a decade of development work, the venture was abandoned. The adjoining Lucky Strike proved equally unsuccessful. However, numerous claims continued to be staked. In 1921, the Kleanza Co prospected on Kleanza Mountain. Columario Gold Mines Ltd later began production on these claims, which proved unprofitable. Exploratory work on the Nicholson Creek mine continued until the 1940s.

== Main roads ==
In 1929, the Terrace–Usk highway opened. During 1931–1941, a series of 2-to-6-kilometre (1 to 4 mi) stretches were built on the Usk–Cedarvale road. which included replacing sections washed out by the 1936 flood. Completion of this section opened the Prince Rupert–Prince George highway in 1944, primarily to military traffic.

In 1958, Western Coach Lines inaugurated a Prince Rupert–Prince George bus service, which included a scheduled stop at Usk. The next year, the company withdrew the service.

In 1960, Prince Coach Lines assumed the Prince Rupert–Prince George route. In 1966, Canadian Coachways bought the company. Usk was a scheduled stop at least during the 1960s.

In 1968–69, the Usk–Kitwanga reconstruction was completed with the exception of three bridges and some gravelling and paving.

In 1970, Greyhound Canada purchased Canadian Coachways.

== Later community ==
In 2007, a municipal councillor from Usk, Wales made a three-day tour of the area.

In 2022, a fire started by vandals extensively damaged the Usk Pioneer Chapel.

Flood alerts and evacuation orders continue to regularly occur.

The remote community has about 20 residents. The Usk RV Park has 19 sites for visitors.

== Maps ==
- Minister of Mines annual report, 1924: Mineral Claims in the Vicinity of Usk. library.ubc.ca (Report). p. 101 (B89).
- "Standard Oil BC map". www.davidrumsey.com. 1937.
- "Shell BC map". www.davidrumsey.com. 1956. Archived from the original on 2022-10-17.
