= Usk Ferry =

- Locale: Usk
- Waterway: Skeena River
- Transit type: Passenger and vehicle ferry
- Owner: BC Ministry of Transportation and Infrastructure
- Operator: Emil Anderson Maintenance
- Began operation: 1913
- No. of lines: 1
- No. of vessels: 1
- No. of terminals: 2
- Website: Official website

The Usk Ferry operates on the Skeena River at Usk in the Skeena region of west central British Columbia, Canada. The vessel employs reaction ferry propulsion and cable ferry guidance. Off BC Highway 16, the crossing is by road about 182 kilometres (113 mi) west of Smithers and 23 kilometres (14 mi) northeast of Terrace.

Location of the Usk Ferry in
British Columbia, Canada

== Timeline ==
- 1913: The subsidized reaction ferry was installed to handle traffic generated by the arrival of the Grand Trunk Pacific Railway (GTP). The huge ice flows made a rowboat ferry impossible during the changes of season. Consequently, a hand-operated basket-type aerial passenger ferry was rigged between the ferry towers, which proved unsuitable because the 240-metre (800 ft) wire rope sagged, creating a steep upward climb to the opposite shore. Instead, a footbridge was suspended from the ferry traveller cable.
- 1916: The Skeena rose 1.5 metres (5 ft) and took out bridge. The rebuilt shorter bridge proved satisfactory.
- 1917: The cable snapped, setting the scow adrift until grounding near the Kitselas Canyon, where the passengers escaped. The operator lost two fingers.
- 1920–21: A new 13.6-tonne; 13.4-long-ton (15-short-ton) ferry was built.
- 1924–25: A new landing was installed.
- 1927–28: The towers were rebuilt, concrete anchorages added, and the cable replaced.
- 1935–36: A new 4.5-tonne; 4.5-long-ton (5-short-ton) ferry was installed.
- 1936: Snags and debris rushing down the swollen river snapped the main cable, breaking loose the ferry, which drifted to near the head of Kitselas Canyon.
- 1948: The superstructure of a 9.1-tonne; 8.9-long-ton (10-short-ton) ferry was renewed to provide a steel replacement for the former wooden ferry. New towers were built and a new cable installed.
- 1950: Spring floods damaged the ferry.
- 1967: An aerial cage capable of carrying an operator and three adult passengers commenced for the wintertime. This basket-type aerial passenger ferry used the existing ferry cable.
- 1968: A man drowned following an accident at the ferry.
- 1974: The introduction of a double shift extended daily hours.
- 1977–78: Separate towers were erected for the aerial and reaction ferries.
- 1980–81: The aerial ferry motor was moved from the side of the car to the bottom. A new reaction ferry with longer pontoons was constructed.
- 1990: Serious complaints regarding the ferry workers were investigated and corrective action taken. At this time, the two-vehicle, 12-passenger ferry operated 14 hours daily.
- 2002: Service reduced from 18 to 17 hours daily.
- 2004: Nechako Northcoast Construction (NNC) became the service contractor.
- 2013: A commemorative plaque celebrating the centenary was unveiled.
- c.2014: The NNC contract was renewed.
- 2020: Emil Anderson Maintenance bought NNC.

== Operation ==
At some point, the winter suspension bridge was discontinued. During the 1950s and 1960s, a rowboat was used instead. When the ice thickness was sufficient, an ice crossing served pedestrians. This was sometimes little more than planks laid across the ice and a small shallow boat travelling the gap in the middle.

The ferry service is under contract to the British Columbia Ministry of Transportation and Infrastructure (MOTI) and is free of tolls, as are all inland ferries in British Columbia. Emil Anderson Maintenance operates the five- to seven-minute crossing, which runs from 6:45 am until 11:15 pm, with three scheduled breaks. The ferry has a capacity for two vehicles (or one vehicle combination up to 12 metres (39 ft)) and 12 passengers.

== See also ==
- List of Inland Ferries in British Columbia
