= Big Bar Ferry =

Passenger and vehicle ferry across the Fraser River in British Columbia

Coordinates: 51°11′00″N 122°07′59″W

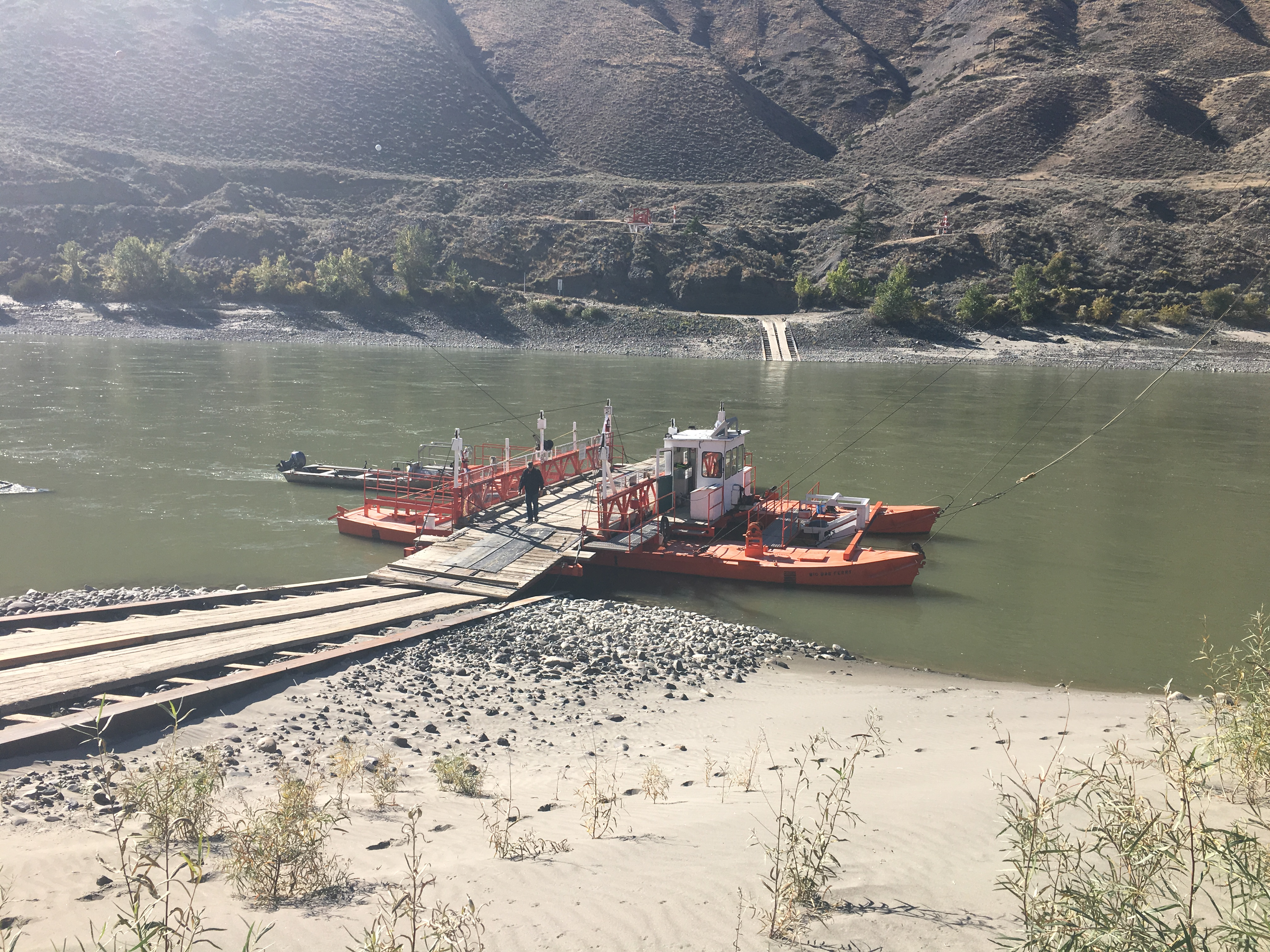
- Locale: British Columbia
- Waterway: Fraser River
- Transit type: Passenger and vehicle ferry
- Operator: British Columbia Ministry of Transportation
- System length: 150 m (490 ft)
- No. of lines: 1
- No. of vessels: 1
- No. of terminals: 2
- Website: www2.gov.bc.ca/gov/content/transportation/passenger-travel/water-travel/inland-ferries/big-bar-reaction-ferry

Big Bar Ferry is a cable ferry across the Fraser River in British Columbia, Canada. It is located about 60 kilometres (37 mi) north of the town of Lillooet and 72 kilometres (45 mi) west of Clinton. 6 km upstream from the ferry is French Bar Canyon (sometimes known as Big Bar Canyon), while downstream is High Bar Canyon (the ferry is located at one of the few places possible for a river crossing accessible by road from both sides in this area). The ferry connects the dirt ranch road up the west side of the Fraser from Lillooet to Big Bar and Kostering, which connect via road to Jesmond and Big Bar Lake, and beyond to BC Highway 97.

== Description ==
Technically, the ferry is a reaction ferry, which is propelled by the current of the water. An overhead cable is suspended from towers anchored on either bank of the river, and a "traveller" is installed on the cable. The ferry is attached to the traveller by a bridle cable. To operate the ferry, rudders are used to ensure that the pontoons are angled into the current, causing the force of the current to move the ferry across the river.

The ferry operates under contract to the British Columbia Ministry of Transportation, is free of tolls, and runs on demand between 0700 and 1900. It carries a maximum of 2 cars and 12 passengers at a time. The crossing is about 150 metres (490 ft) in length, and takes 10 minutes. At times of low/high water, or ice in the river, the ferry is replaced by an aerial tramway that carries passengers only.

== See also ==
- Low Bar Ferry
- Lytton Ferry
- List of crossings of the Fraser River
