= McLure Ferry =

Coordinates: 51.041165°N 120.241456°W

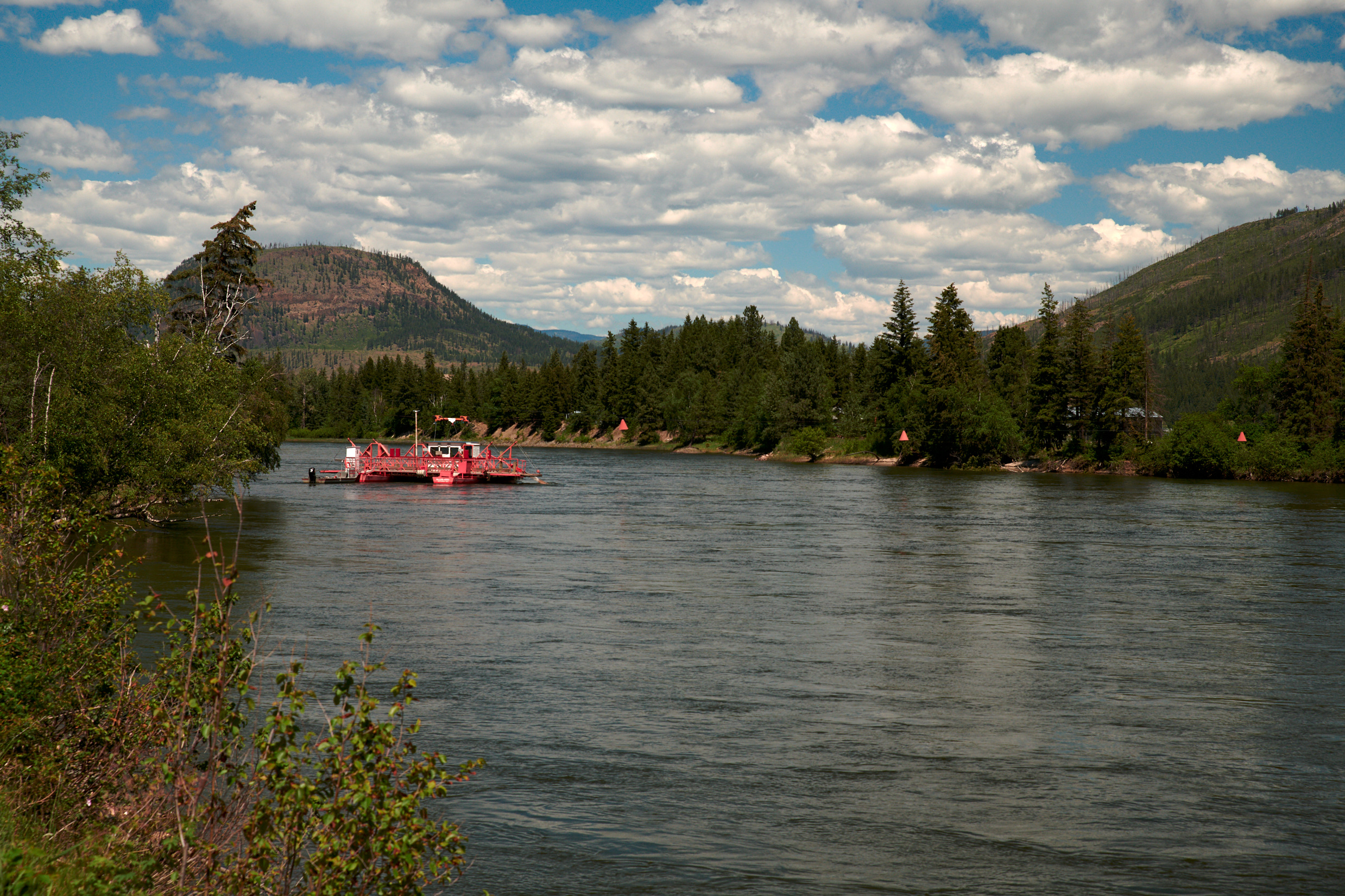
McLure Ferry from the west bank of the North Thompson River looking north.

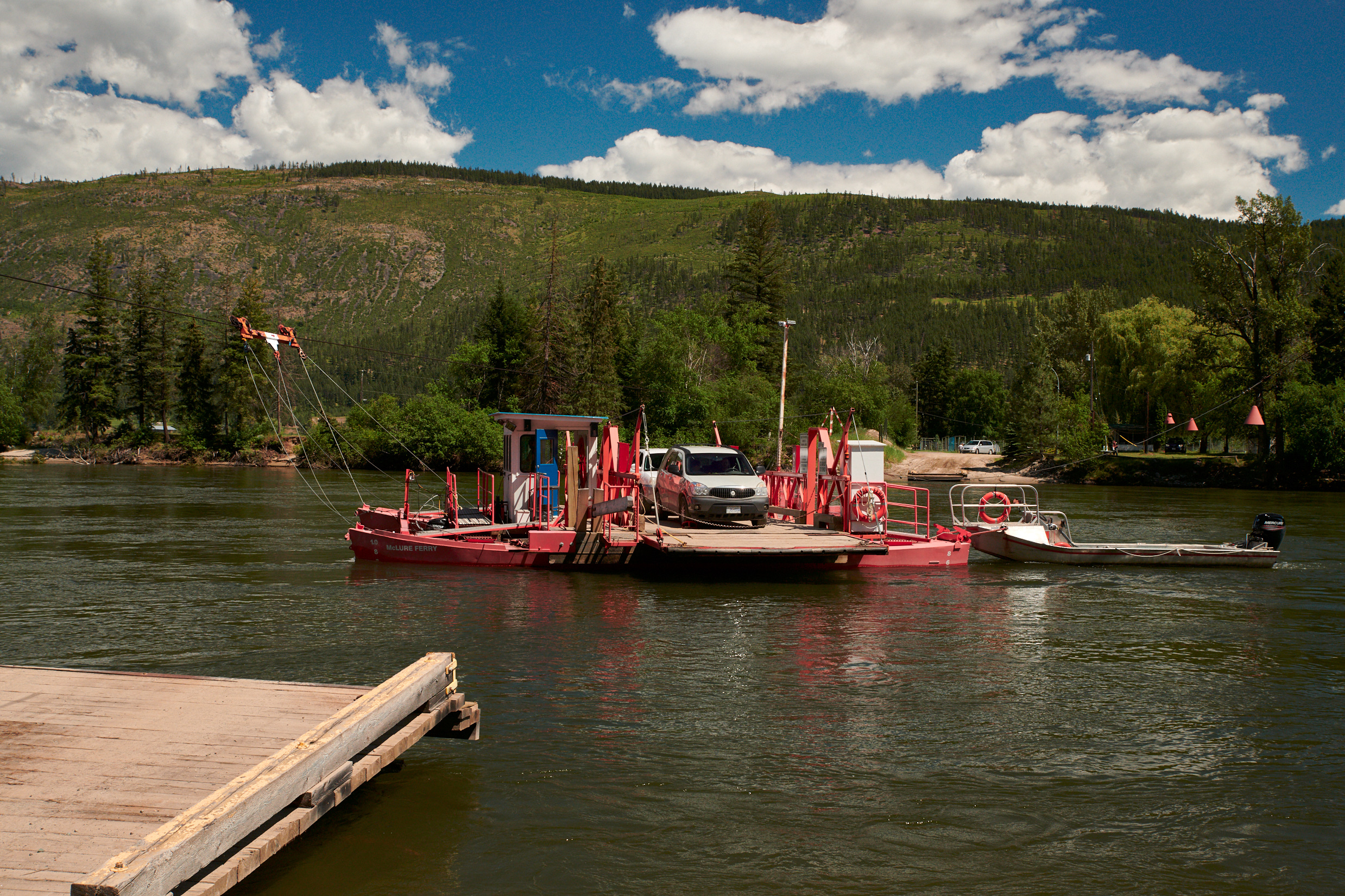
McLure Ferry about to make landfall on the West Bank of the Thompson River, about 50 km north of Kamloops BC.

The McLure Ferry is a cable ferry across the North Thompson River in British Columbia, Canada. It is situated about 43 kilometres (27 mi) north of Kamloops.

Specifically, the ferry is a reaction ferry, which is propelled by the current of the water. An overhead cable is suspended from towers anchored on either bank of the river, and a "traveller" is installed on the cable. The ferry is attached to the traveller by a bridle cable. To operate the ferry, rudders are used to ensure that the pontoons are angled into the current, causing the force of the current to move the ferry across the river.

The ferry operates under contract to the British Columbia Ministry of Transportation, is free of tolls, and runs on demand between 0700 and 1820. It carries a maximum of 2 cars and 12 passengers at a time. The crossing is about 100 metres (330 ft) in length, and takes 5 minutes. The ferry does not operate at times of high water or winter freeze up.
