= Current (hydrology) =

Directional flow in a water body

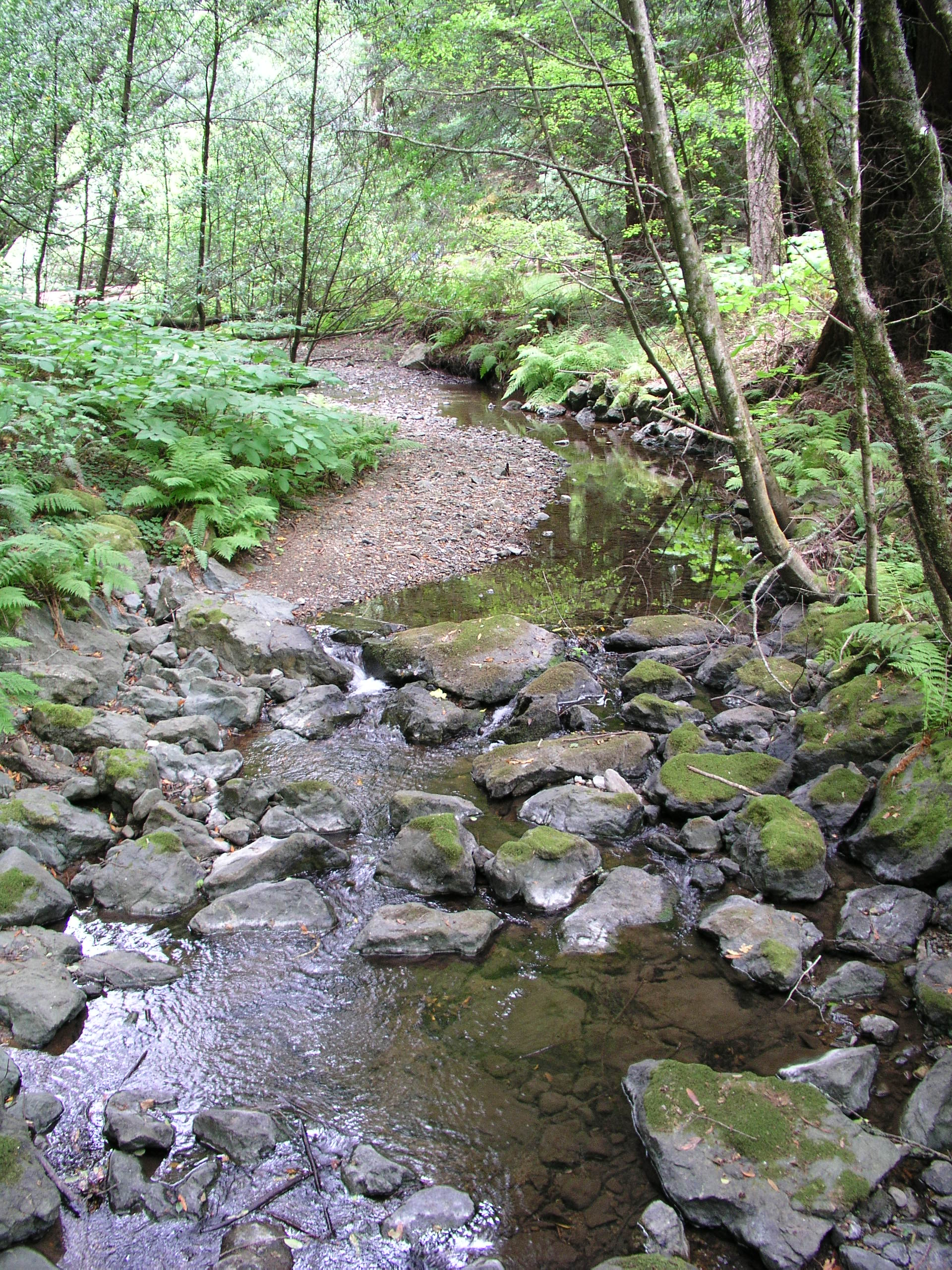
The water in this stream forms varying currents as it makes its way downhill

In hydrology, a current in a water body is the flow of water in any one particular direction. The current varies spatially as well as temporally, depending upon the flow rate, stream gradient, and channel geometry. In tidal zones, the current and streams may reverse on the flood tide before resuming on the ebb tide. On a global scale, wind and the rotation of the Earth greatly influence the flow of ocean currents.

In a stream or river the current is influenced by gravity; the term upstream (or upriver) refers to the direction towards the source of the stream (or river), i.e. against the direction of flow. Likewise, the term downstream or downriver describes the direction towards the mouth of the stream or river, in which the current flows. The terms left bank and right bank refer to the banks as seen from the direction of flow, in the downstream direction.

== See also ==
- Current meter – Device for measuring the flow in a water current
- Discharge (hydrology) – Flow rate of water that is transported through a given cross-sectional area
- Rheoscope – Instrument for measuring fluid viscosity
- Rheotaxis – Type of movement by aquatic life
- Rip current – Water current moving away from shore
- Volumetric flow rate – Volume of fluid which passes per unit time
