= Boswell, British Columbia =

Boswell
- Settlement
- Location of Boswell in British Columbia
- Coordinates: 49°27′15″N 116°45′45″W
- Country: Canada
- Province: British Columbia
- Region: Kootenays
- Regional district: Central Kootenay
- Elevation: 556 m (1,824 ft)
- Time zone: UTC-7 (MST, PST)
- Area codes: 250, 778, 236, & 672
- Highways: Highway 3A

Boswell is an unincorporated community in the West Kootenay region of southeastern British Columbia. The former steamboat landing and temporary ferry terminal is adjacent to McGregor Creek on the east shore of the south arm of Kootenay Lake. Comprising a few kilometres stretched along BC Highway 3A, the location is by road about 48 kilometres (30 mi) north of Creston and by road and ferry about 76 kilometres (47 mi) southeast of Nelson.

== Name origin ==
McGregor, the former name dating from around 1900, referred to D.C. McGregor of Trail, who preempted the landing site. During a 1906 visit, Governor-General Earl Grey bought orchard land for his son Viscount Howick. Howick was so impressed with Elias John Boswell, who surveyed this property, that he named the enterprise Boswell Ranch. Boswell became the post office name on opening.

== Steamboats ==
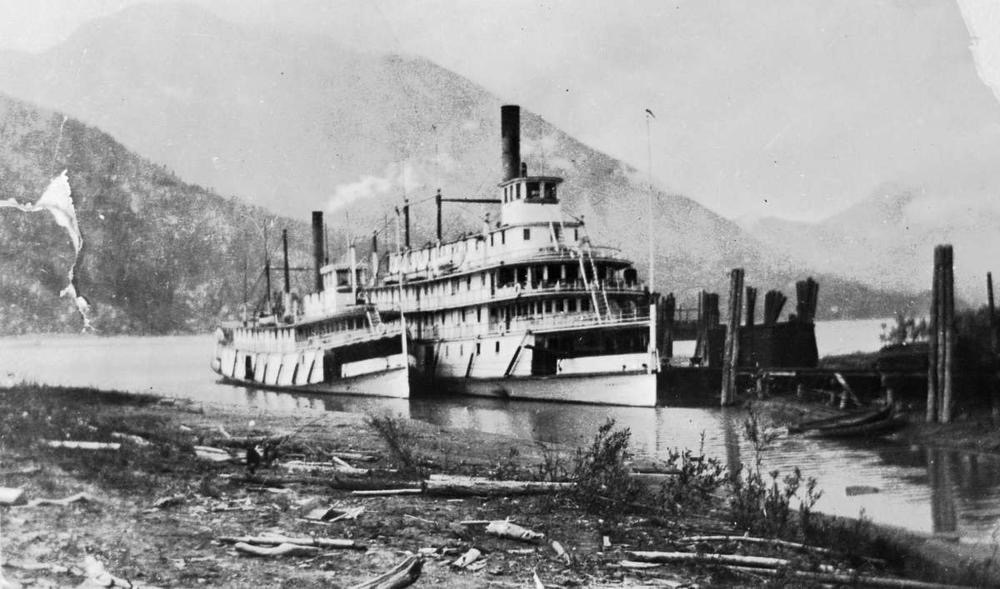
Lake steamers Kokanee (left) and Nasookin (right) at Boswell, BC, c.1918.

Initially, steamboats stopped on request. Later, the scheduled stop of twice a week grew to three times weekly before becoming daily in mid-1914. Completed in 1913, the first government wharf was destroyed by a storm on the official opening day. The subsequent floating wharf was replaced in 1921. Prior to 1931, the settlement depended upon the lake boats for transportation.

In April 1931, the government east–west Kootenay Lake Ferry service began. After two days, the poor road conditions prompted a temporary change to two daily trips to Boswell instead of three to Gray Creek. That September, the three daily trips to Gray Creek were restored. The same substitution occurred the next year for a couple of months.

== Roads ==
The first road was from the Boswell Ranch to the landing. The road was extended to the post office at the Kennedy Ranch in 1912, and soon after, north to Lewis Bay. By 1919, the road stretched about 3 kilometres (2 mi) north and south. By 1931, a dirt road connected Kuskonook and Gray Creek. That year, Greyhound Canada began serving communities along the eastern lakeshore. By 1945, three buses travelled daily in each direction. This highway was paved in 1949.

== Mining ==
During the 1890s, mining activity peaked in the area. D. McGregor prospected on McGregor Creek. In the early 1900s, about 3 kilometres (2 mi) south at Akokli (Goat) Creek, miners worked the stream. Their rock pier for loading ore was one of the first on the east side of the lake. Mining claims were also staked at Lockhart and La France creek, respectively about 6 kilometres (4 mi) and 8 kilometres (5 mi) north of Boswell. The La France Mining Co, formed in 1906, completed extensive underground tunnelling but shipped no ore before the venture collapsed during World War I. Akokli Creek was the industrial heart. The Valparaiso, staked in the mid-1890s, was the most famous property. Mining continued sporadically. However, gold and silver recoveries proved uneconomic. A small aerial tramway to the lakeside was installed in the 1930s, but the mine closed in 1941.

== Agriculture ==
In the early 1900s, about 5 kilometres (3 mi) south, the Ginol family planted strawberries, grapes and fruit trees. By 1912, the Boswell Ranch contained 2,000 fruit trees. The popular fall fairs, which began in 1914, exhibited local fruit and vegetables.

The temperate climate favoured apple orchards and soft fruit, especially cherries, gooseberries, raspberries and strawberries. Boswell established a fruit growers association in 1916 and farmers institute in 1921. The lake boat service, which shipped out produce, largely ceased when the Canadian Pacific Railway opened the Kootenay Landing to Procter link at the beginning of 1931. Rather than allow the soft fruit to over ripen while waiting at the landing, a jam factory was built to process perishable produce. The factory eventually closed and the market for apples diminished by the mid-1950s.

== Early community ==
Early preemptions in the area were for Ken Wattie around 1894, John "Scotty" Gordon in 1898, Duncan McGregor in 1901, and Isaac Lewis in 1904. James Johnstone, a non-resident, was a land promoter who sold properties to many of the early settlers. Mrs Emma Ginol was the inaugural postmaster 1907–1910 and the post office was at the Boswell Ranch. Mrs Mary Kennedy served 1910–1945, using her home.

In 1911, the first Anglican service was held in the A.R. Wilson residence. In 1912, J. Coupland established a small general store. The schoolhouse opened early that year. Miss Laura E. Symonds was the inaugural schoolteacher 1912–1919. A teacherage was built in the 1920s. The school closed in 1947, students being bussed to Crawford Bay. Opened in 1921, the Boswell Memorial Hall was used for church services and various community activities.

The population of Boswell was 75 by 1918, increasing to 97 by 1925. Relief camps providing labour for road construction during the Great Depression swelled the number to 150 by 1932. During the 1940s and 1950s, an orchestra existed. In the 1960s, a small church building was erected.

== Later community ==
The cemetery, still in use, dates from the mid 1920s. Boswell is largely a retirement community. Popular tourist attractions in the area include the nearby Lockhart Beach Provincial Park, Mackie Beach Park, and the Glass House. The annual Lady Grey Flower Show is held in the community hall, a venue which also hosts various social functions. In 2021, the Boswell Historical Society published a new edition of the history titled "Boswell Beginnings and Beyond", comprising about 100 pages of new material.

== Destiny Bay ==
About 3 kilometres (2 mi) south, Donald and Lil West settled in 1928 and developed their property into the Destiny Bay Tourist Camp with cabins and a store. The name came either from a Donn Byrne novel or a belief that the project was the couple's destiny. Prior to the east shore highway construction, guests arrived by sternwheeler. The location became a meal stop for cars and the Greyhound bus. The present lodge was later built. A sawmill was established in 1930 and logging continued into the 1940s.

The October 1963 opening of the Salmo–Creston highway over the Kootenay Pass eliminated most through traffic reducing business viability. By the early 1980s, the main building was unused apart from a section operating as a diner. The three-storey lodge was refurbished and opened as the Destiny Bay Resort in 1982. Tourist accommodation comprises five cottages and three suites in the main lodge. A general store/post office exists across the highway. However, passing traffic remains insufficient to make the store a successful year-round operation.
