= Queens Bay =

- Location of Queens Bay in British Columbia
- Coordinates: 49°39′00″N 116°56′00″W
- Country: Canada
- Province: British Columbia
- Region: West Kootenay
- Regional district: Central Kootenay
- Area codes: 250, 778, 236, & 672
- Highway: Highway 31

Queens Bay is an unincorporated community in the West Kootenay region of southeastern British Columbia. The former steamboat landing is on the west shore of Kootenay Lake. The locality, off Highway 31, is about 38 kilometres (24 mi) northeast of Nelson.

== Name origin ==
Honouring Queen Victoria, the name ascribed to the bay in the 1880s was later adopted for the settlement. The benchlands were logged in the early 1890s to provide fuel for the Pilot Bay smelter across the lake. Around 1897, several preemptions were filed, but the individuals moved on before claiming title. In 1903, a wildfire blackened the hillside.

== Early community ==
The community was established around 1900. Walter West, a squatter, kept a chicken farm until his death in 1904. Over the following years, James Johnstone bought a large tract at the southern end and Dr. Ross did likewise at the northern end. From 1907, real estate agents promoted the commercial orchard potential, luring many settlers from the UK. Edgar T. Ross, who settled in early 1908, was the inaugural postmaster 1909–1911, before moving on. In 1908, Harry Scott-Lauder and his younger brother R. Arthur settled but quickly realized the challenge of harnessing the sparse water supplies of local creeks. Arthur was postmaster 1917–1929.

George Frederic and Edith Catherine Attree also arrived with their two sons in 1908. Although George died in 1918, Edith remained an active resident for 42 years. A year or two later than the Attrees, John Herbert and Sarah Alice Hoyle came with their three children. In 1925, a wintertime slide blocked Hoyle creek creating a dam. When the dam burst, the torrent dislodged a large concrete water tank, which careered into the lower level of their house where the couple were sleeping. Buried beneath the debris, both died.

About 1909, the Eighth Baron of Belrath, Ireland, Lord Aylmer, and his wife, migrated from Ottawa with their five adult children. No doubt their connections prompted the 1911 installation of the second federally funded wharf on the lake. The log community hall, built about this time, was demolished around 1947. The Queens Bay Fruit Growers Association, which formed about 1912, erected a log packing shed in 1922. On amalgamating with the Harrop association in the late 1920s, the body became the Kootenay Lake Fruit Growers Association centralized at the Harrop shed. About 1952, the abandoned Queens Bay shed was demolished.

The Balfour–Queens Bay road was completed around 1912 and opened to Ainsworth and Kaslo about 1926. By 1923, a jitney service ran to Nelson. Mrs. S.A. Codd was the inaugural official teacher at the school, which operated 1912–1929, 1931–1932, and 1934–1942. Kenneth Athalmer Aylmer was the final postmaster 1929–1964.

The Lodge opened in the late 1930s. In the mid-1950s, a private hydroelectricity plant was installed and the venture was renamed the Antler Lodge and Marina. A fire destroyed the building in 1984.

== Church ==
Originally named All Hallows, St. Francis-in-the-Woods opened in 1915. Although electricity arrived in 1938, a stove continued to provide heating for decades. The bell tower/steeple was added in 1971, as a memorial to Private Thomas C. Ough. Dwindling attendance led to deconsecration of the Anglican church in 1994. Soon after, the building was bought for $1 to be a community hall. During 1999, extensive renovations included rewiring and replacing rotting timbers. Artist Thomas Kinkade composed a painting of the church. In 2012, the bulk of Christmas Miracle, a low-budget production, was filmed inside the building.

== Later community ==
The upper portion of the neighbourhood is often referred to as the Queens Bay townsite. These properties serve as weekend retreats or as a bedroom community for Nelson.

In 2015, Queens Bay was one of the first BC communities and the first in the Kootenays to be awarded with the FireSmart designation for local wildfire protection efforts. That year, the British Columbia Ministry of Transportation and Infrastructure (MOTI) commissioned SNC-Lavalin to examine a number of potential ferry sites, as well as improvements to the existing Balfour site. Issued in March 2016, a key recommendation of the report was to relocate the terminal to Queens Bay North. The findings triggered a negative local reaction.

== Notable people ==
John Cooper (1936–2021), painter, was a resident for decades until 2018.

== See also ==
- 2nd Dragoon Guards (Queen's Bays)
