= Riondel =

Hamlet of Riondel
- Settlement
- Location of Riondel in British Columbia
- Coordinates: 49°46′N 116°51′W
- Country: Canada
- Province: British Columbia
- Region: Kootenays
- Regional district: Central Kootenay
- Founded: 1907
- Named for: Count Edouard Riondel

Government
  - Governing body: Riondel Commission of Management
  - Chairman: Gerald Panio

Area (2021)
  - Land: 0.7 km^{2} (0.27 sq mi)
- Elevation: 576 m (1,890 ft)

Population (2021)
  - Total: 266
  - Density: 379.7/km^{2} (983/sq mi)
- Time zone: UTC−07:00 (MST)
- Postal code span: V0B
- Area codes: 250, 778, 236, & 672
- Highways: Highway 3A
- Waterways: Kootenay Lake
- Website: Community of Riondel

Riondel is an unincorporated community on the eastern shore of Kootenay Lake in the Kootenays region of southeastern British Columbia. The village of approximately 266 people is on Riondel Road about 10 km (6.2 mi) north of Kootenay Bay, the Kootenay Lake ferry eastern terminal. The latter is about 81 km (50 mi) by road north of Creston and 43 km (27 mi) by road and lake ferry northeast of Nelson.

== History ==
=== Explorers ===
The Kutenai (Ktunaxa) showed Archibald McDonald of the Hudson's Bay Company the huge lead outcrop in 1844. However, the estimated 970 km (600 mi) to the mouth of the Columbia River made the deposits worthless. By the 1880s, railroads advancing across the United States, and steamboats travelling up the rivers into British Columbia, would change the economics.

=== Sproule and Hendryx ===
In 1882, Robert Evan (Bob) Sproule staked four claims along the Riondel Peninsula, which included the Bluebell Mine. In 1884, Sproule sold an interest in the mine to Dr. Wilbur A. Hendryx, but forfeited an interest to George Jennings Ainsworth to settle a partner's debt. In 1886, Sproule was sent to the gallows and hanged for murdering Thomas Hammill over a claim dispute from years earlier. At this time, on buying out the Ainsworth interests, the mine ownership passed wholly to Hendryx's Kootenay Mining and Smelting Company (KM&S). The settlement was known as Hendryx or Hendryx Camp. When the ineffective Pilot Bay smelter closed in 1896, the Hendryx settlement was renamed the Blue Bell Camp.

Riondel

=== Canadian Metal Company ===
In 1905, the Canadian Metal Company purchased the mine. The next year, the steamboat hulks containing dormitories were replaced by married men's cottages and single men's bunkhouses. In 1907, the settlement was renamed Riondel after Count Edouard Riondel, the company president and French banker. Often mispronounced, the correct way is Ree-on-del with the accent very slightly on the first syllable. The concentrator, operational from 1908, proved effective. When new pumping equipment failed to keep pace with flooding at the lower levels, the mine was abandoned in 1921.

=== Fowler and Eastman ===
In 1924, engineer and entrepreneur, S.S. Fowler, with partner B.L. Eastman, obtained some financial backing from Canadian Pacific Railway's Consolidated Mining and Smelting (CM&S and now Teck Resources) subsidiary to reopen the operation. Able to sufficiently dewater the mine, extraction resumed. After concentrating the zinc-rich lead ore using a methodology determined by the limited electricity supply, the product went to the Trail smelter. To raise further capital, the venture was incorporated in 1929 as the Blue Bell Mines Limited, but the October stock market crash financially ruined the partners.

=== Consolidated Mining and Smelting ===
The major creditor, CM&S assumed ownership, leaving the mine idle until after World War II. The Riondel population, formerly stable at around 70 people, dropped to 22 by 1943. Beginning in 1950, the mine and the settlement were refurbished at a cost of $1.3 million, including a new smelter. Hydroelectricity plants across the lake on the Kootenay River replaced local generators for the electricity supply. The mine operated from 1952 until exhausted in 1971. Having supported a population of 300, it was the longest active mine in the province. The site was abandoned four years later.

=== Post-mining community ===
Most employees departed, but many older ones stayed. Riondel became a popular retirement community, at one time having more seniors per capita than any other postal code in Canada.

Today Riondel is a tidy village with streets, a lakeside campground, beach, community centre, playground, cable TV system, 9-hole golf course, grocery and liquor store, café, and pub. In April 2006, Telus connected Riondel with dial-up internet.

== Demographics ==
As of the 2021 Canadian census conducted by Statistics Canada, Riondel had a population of 266 living in 140 of its 206 total private dwellings, a change of 5.1% from its 2016 population of 253. With a land area of 0.7 km^{2} (0.27 sq mi), it had a population density of 380.0/km^{2} (984.2/sq mi) in 2021.

The median age of Riondel is 62, average age 55.2, compared with 42.8, and 43.1, for the province as a whole. Compared to the rest of the province the population is older with 42.6 per cent being 65 or older, while only 20.3 per cent of all British Columbians are in that age group.

In terms of language and ethnicity the community was fairly homogeneous with 92.4 per cent reporting English as their mother tongue, 1.89 per cent French, and 5.66 per cent reporting Slavic or German languages. There were no reported visible minorities or people with Indigenous ancestry. However, there was a small Indigenous population with 15 people reporting they were First Nations.

== Services ==
=== Emergency services ===
Riondel has a volunteer fire department as well as ambulance service, both on Fowler Street. Both are available at all times for emergencies.

=== Postal service ===
Sharing a building with the Riondel Market, the Riondel Post Office is part of Canada Post. It is closed on Saturdays and Sundays and closes daily from 1:00 P.M. to 1:30 P.M. for the lunch break.

=== Schooling ===
Public schooling is available in Crawford Bay. The Riondel Community Centre was once a school but is now a town complex.

== Recreational activities ==
=== Hiking ===
- The Waterfront Trail follows 1.5 km (0.93 mi) of the lake shore from the south end of North Bay beach;
- Pebble Beach Trail, 7 km (4.3 mi) north of Riondel, leads from the Kootenay Lake East FS Road to a south-facing pebbled beach;
- The 15-minute Pilot Bay Lighthouse Trail, in the Pilot Bay Provincial Park, leads to an historic 1907 lighthouse;
- The one-hour Pilot Bay Marine Park Trail covers varying terrain along the lake shore;
- Plaid Lake Hiking Trail, near Crawford Bay, is a full-day hike to the alpine Plaid Lake on the west side of the Purcell Mountains;
- Duck Lakes Dykes Trail, near Sirdar, offers miles of almost level hiking through some of the richest waterfowl habitat in BC.

=== Golf ===
The two golf clubs are the 9-hole, Par 3 course at the Riondel Golf Club (on Galena Bay Wharf Road, 10 minutes from the Kootenay Lake ferry), and the 18-hole championship Kokanee Springs Golf Resort (in Crawford Bay).

=== Fishing ===
Kootenay Lake is well stocked with many species of fish, including kokanee (sockeye salmon), rainbow and cutthroat trout, Dolly Varden, burbot, and whitefish. The lake supports record-sized rainbow trout. The world's largest recorded kokanee, almost 4.5 kg (10 lb), was caught in Kootenay Lake. Kokanee (Kekeni) means 'red fish' in the Interior Salish languages of the Sinixt. It is the name given to the land-locked salmon that spawn in large numbers in Kokanee Creek in the late summer. The best fishing time is in the fall and winter months.

=== Camping ===
The private Riondel Campground is 1 km (0.62 mi) from the Riondel general store. It has 34 sites and is located next to North Beach. A second campground and RV park lies 12 km (7.5 mi) north of Riondel at Garland Bay.

=== Riondel Daze ===
During the weekend of the August Civic Holiday, Riondel hosts an annual celebration called Riondel Daze. The Historical Society of Riondel usually has its vintage ambulance, a 1949 Mercury, at the event. Other elements are a ball tournament with a hot dog stand, local music, and a stand-still parade.

=== Sundry ===
Other outdoor opportunities in Riondel include canoeing or kayaking the waters of Kootenay Lake (rentals available), swimming, wildlife and nature viewing, boating and sailing, horse-drawn adventures, and back country exploration. On Sundays, a youth group at the Riondel Recreation Centre plays floor hockey and other games such as pool and air hockey; they also have movies available.

=== Riondel Community Centre ===
The Riondel Community Centre, in a former school, has an auditorium for community events. The centre houses the Riondel Art Club, the Riondel Community Association, the Riondel Commission of Management, Riondel Community Library, and the Historical Society. A children's playground is outside.
