= Harrop Cable Ferry =

Cable ferry in British Columbia, Canada

Coordinates: 49°36′33″N 117°03′07″W

Harrop Ferry
- Locale: Longbeach and Harrop, British Columbia
- Waterway: West Arm, Kootenay Lake
- Transit type: Passenger and vehicle ferry
- Owner: BC Ministry of Transportation and Infrastructure
- Operator: Western Pacific Marine
- No. of lines: 1
- No. of vessels: 1
- No. of terminals: 2
- Website: www2.gov.bc.ca/gov/content/transportation/passenger-travel/water-travel/inland-ferries/harrop-cable-ferry

The Harrop Ferry is a cable ferry at Harrop Narrows on the west arm of Kootenay Lake in the West Kootenay region of southeastern British Columbia. The crossing, off BC Highway 3A, is by road about 27 kilometres (17 mi) northeast of Nelson and 7 kilometres (4 mi) west of Balfour.

== Place name origin ==
George Buchanan's sawmill, the first on the lake, operated 1889–1892. The name Sawmill Point outlasted the mill itself. When Walter W. West preempted 65 hectares (160 acres) of lakeshore property in 1894, the point became better known as West's Landing by the late 1890s. In 1895, Andrew McCoy made a similar preemption about 800 metres (880 yd) downstream from the present ferry, from which Chinese labourers cut cordwood. The wood stockpile became a major refueling station on the west arm for steamboats.

When the Canadian Pacific Railway (CP) opened the Nelson–Procter spur in 1900, a siding was installed near the McCoy's property. Although land developers called the locality Trafalgar, the more popular usages were McCoy's Siding, McCoy Station, or McCoy's Point. Sawmill Point, West's, and 13-mile point were also used interchangeably for the steamer landing and locality. In a post office application, the authorities rejected the name Trafalgar, but accepted Harrop after Ernest Harrop, the inaugural postmaster 1907–1930.

Similarly, Mill Creek was renamed Harrop Creek. Harrop Point is also named for the locality.

== Early Harrop community ==
In 1903, a subdivision for orchards was created, which by 1909 had developed into a settlement that included a school and the Harrop general store. In 1910, a Methodist church was built and an adequate road was completed to Procter Edith Sinclair was the inaugural teacher for the 1908/09 school year. Lacking sufficient numbers to be government funded, the class was held in a log shack. A couple of years later, classes temporarily moved into the new church building, before a one-room school was erected in 1912.

Built in 1925, the Harrop Co-op packing shed could eventually process 750 boxes of apples per day. The upper storey was a community centre, which hosted social events, including the annual fall fair. That year, the United church assumed the Methodist congregation. Also, the Nelson–Procter jitney stage service commenced in tandem with the river-crossing ferry, but does not appear to have operated during the wintertime. The next year, a gas station opened. In 1930, the Harrop Co-op sold the gas station site to Herbert Fairbank and Jack Berry, who erected a store on the property, having already bought the Harrop general store, west of the wharf road. The post office moved to the new store a short distance south.

Until 1930, CP's Nasookin stopped both ways on the Nelson–Kootenay Landing run. At this time, a CP gravel pit existed at Harrop. CP did not establish a passenger train stop until the opening of the Procter–Kootenay Landing rail link in 1931.

The packing shed was demolished in the late 1950s. The Stafford Lumber mill operated from 1955 until the late 1960s. The first part of the Harrop hall was completed in 1958, and additions added in 1964 and 1976. The United church closed in 1962 and the post office the next year. The general store closed about this time.

== North shore ==
On the northern shore at today's ferry, Frederick E. West obtained a 65-hectare (160-acre) preemption in 1894. A series of landings existed downstream. When the government wharf was built a quarter mile downstream at Hallett's Landing in 1913, that landing was renamed Longbeach.

In 1906, John Henry Jerram bought some of West's lakeside property, one part of which he sold to the Fox brothers, and another to Leslie Wightwick, for whom Wightwick Road is named. Jerram's Landing was a stop on the 1913 CP steamboat timetable. Fox Landing was named for brothers, George Oscar Montague Fox and Beaufoy Howard Fox, whose ranch included the location. In 1908, they established the Kootenay Jam Co. in their house but relocated the business to Nelson the following year.

In 1927, Longbeach landing ceased to be a stop for passing steamboats.

== Initial Harrop–Longbeach ferry ==
In early years, a log raft pushed by a launch largely moved cattle.

Constructed at the Nelson ferry landing, the wooden four-car-capacity scow was guided by a 520-metre (1,700 ft) cable and propelled by a 14 hp engine below deck.

In August 1925, the ferry inauguration provided road access to the south shore. Premier John Oliver conducted the official opening ceremony about a week later. The Harrop–Longbeach ferry was the original name. Longbeach residents would cross to Harrop for their mail, groceries, and social functions at the Harrop packing shed.

To provide clearance in low water at each shore, sand was periodically dredged.

Travel outside regular hours was not toll free. To encourage non-locals to attend Harrop or Procter dances, the organizers picked up any shortfall to provide free ferry travel, or a reduced rate, on these runs outside the regular operating hours.

In 1929, while below deck, the operator died of carbon monoxide poisoning from the gasoline engine. By 1930, operating hours extended in the summer, before reverting to 7am to 7pm. That year, truck traffic carrying construction materials dropped dramatically on completion of the rail link.

In 1934, dry rot was discovered in the scow.

== 1938 upgrade ==
In 1937, a contract was awarded for the construction of a new wooden scow, which entered service the next year. A 1931 Model A Ford engine, mounted on a sponson, used sprockets and chains to power the drive shaft fitted with propellers at each end. In 1939, high winds and waves snapped the cable, sending the ferry ashore downstream. Tugs and the Nasookin retrieved the vessel.

During the early 1940s, sandbars required dredging near both shores. In 1941, the engine was remounted down in the scow to provide direct-drive propulsion.

== 1947 upgrade ==
Built by Western Bridge and Steel Fabricators and launched in July 1946, the 21.3-by-7.3-by-1.4-metre (70 by 24 by 4.5 ft) single-lane steel barge entered service in June 1947.

In 1952, operating times increased one hour on weekdays and two hours at weekends. In 1954, the service was renamed the Harrop ferry. In 1955, weekday hours were increased to 19 and Saturday to 21.

== 1962 upgrade ==
Built as Hull #123 by Allied Shipbuilders in 1961, the two-lane, 10-vehicle, 50 passenger steel ferry entered service in April 1962. The additional length could accommodate logging trucks.

Very long ramps were fitted to the ferry to improve loading/unloading. Up to this time, a cumbersome to move wooden ramp was repositioned up/down the slipway based upon the water level.

In 1965, 24-hour summer service was introduced.

Of the career operators, Bunt Ogilvie retired in 1966 after 32 years of service; Bert Fitchett in 1975 after 40 years; and Bim Rowley in 1978 after 33 years.

== 1990s upgrade ==
Prior to the 1959 opening of the Nelson orange bridge, this vessel served that crossing, and then the Castlegar–Robson crossing until the Robson road bridge opened in the early 1990s. The vessel was dismantled and reassembled for the Harrop service. The maximum capacity was 48 passengers and 21 vehicles. During 2018, the ferry carried about 290,000 vehicles and 419,000 passengers.

== 2019 upgrade ==
The British Columbia Ministry of Transportation and Infrastructure (MOTI) commissioned Capilano Maritime Design to partner with Waterbridge Steel Inc. in a design-build contract to supply four new cable ferries. In each, a John Deere 4045 diesel engine with 110 kW output powers a DC alternator for onboard electrics and a radial piston hydraulic motor to a dual bullwheel traction winch.

Launched in 2019, the Harrop II was the third vessel to be delivered under the Waterbridge contract. The carrying capacity is 24 vehicles and 98 passengers. While docked during off-peak hours, the vessel's on-board batteries supply power, reducing noise at the terminal and lowering greenhouse gas emissions.

The ferry service is under contract to MOTI and is free of tolls, as are all inland ferries in British Columbia. Western Pacific Marine operates the five-minute crossing, which is on-demand 24 hours a day.

== Accidents ==
Driving down the ramp at Harrop before the ferry arrival cost a life. Two drowned when their vehicle traversed the ferry deck at Longbeach and plunged into the water.

== Later Harrop community ==
The inaugural Annual Harrop Harvest Festival was held in 2002. The mid-September festival comprises the sale of local handicrafts, produce, and baked goods, with live music performances.

The term Harrop-Procter is used to indicate an aggregation of the two communities. The two serve as an eco-tourism destination, and a section of land that backs onto the West Arm Provincial Park is called the Harrop-Procter Community Forest. In 1999, the Harrop-Procter Community Co-operative was incorporated to manage this forest. Harrop-Procter Forest Products, a subsidiary of the co-op, operates a portable sawmill using Wood-Mizer machinery. Of the 2.8 million board feet of logs harvested each year using ecologically sound practices, about 1 million board feet are processed by the sawmill, and the balance are sold to other mills in the region.

The other significant Harrop business is the PRT Harrop nursery, which grows all the commercial tree species found in Canada and the western US, as well as standard seedlings. The nursery was established in 1982 after a successful pilot project launched in 1976 upon the site of former Stafford mill. In 2020, the property sustained some fire damage. The former schoolhouse (1912), which later became a residence, is owned by the Harrop and District Community Centre, and now houses a gallery that showcases local artists and facilitates arts workshops.

In 2021, two locomotives and eight cars of a freight train derailed near Harrop.

The dry dock immediately to the east at Sunshine Bay, which has operated since 1955, was towed to a Nelson shipyard in 2021.

== Notable Harrop people ==
Sydney Hutcheson (1908–1975), author, was a resident 1947–1975.

William Charles Lawrence "Larry" Piper (1880–1955), skating champion and professional baseball player, was a resident 1920–1955.

Richard Gibbons Pope (1850–1929), politician, who earlier served as mayor of Mortlach, Saskatchewan, was a resident 1922–1929.

== See also ==
- List of crossings of the Kootenay River
- List of Inland Ferries in British Columbia
