= Procter, British Columbia =

Procter
- Location of Procter in British Columbia
- Coordinates: 49°37′04″N 116°57′40″W
- Country: Canada
- Province: British Columbia
- Region: West Kootenay
- Regional district: Central Kootenay
- Area codes: 250, 778, 236, & 672

Procter is an unincorporated community in the West Kootenay region of southeastern British Columbia. The former steamboat landing is on the south shore at the entrance to the West Arm of Kootenay Lake. By road and ferry, the locality (via BC Highway 3A and Harrop Procter Rd) is about 35 kilometres (22 mi) northeast of Nelson.

== Name origin ==
In 1891, Thomas Gregg Procter bought land at the lake outlet, and subsequently enlarged his home into a hunting and fishing lodge. In early 1897, a British syndicate acquired nearby land to create the town of Kootenay City, in anticipation of the coming railway. Between July 1897 and October 1898, the Canadian Pacific Railway (CP) built westward from Lethbridge via the Crowsnest Pass to the Kootenay Landing terminal (not Nelson as in its charter). The townsite proposal lapsed when the northwestward extension, which would have served their property, was instead operated by lake boats. By mid-1898, the location was known as Procter's Landing. In 1900, the lighthouse was built. T.G. Procter was the inaugural postmaster 1906–1908. In 1913, he died in Oak Bay, in a hit-and-run, reputedly the first person to die in an automobile accident in BC.

== CP railway and lake boats ==
When CP opened the Nelson–Procter spur in 1900, the company created a townsite at the landing, called Procter, in honour of the original owner. In early 1901, at Sunshine Bay, between Harrop and nearby Procter, CP opened a wharf complex to handle freight cars, redefining the lake boat route from Kootenay Landing. That year, the first station was built on the Procter slip siding. In 1908, a proper station was erected on the main line. In 1911, a brakeman's leg was cut off in a train accident at the slip.

From the beginning, the place name was often misspelled Proctor. The engineer in charge of the railway spur construction, Alexander Forbes Proctor, would use his spelling on documentation. In due course, this version appeared on timetables, maps, and the train station sign. Both spellings were used for decades before settling upon Procter.

For 18 months during 1929–1930, a construction camp existed at Procter for the Procter–Kootenay Landing rail project. During this period, Coleman's Mill operated to produce ties for the extension. In 1931, opening the rail link service ended this CP lake route, and most activity at the Sunshine Bay wharves. However, the east–west Kootenay Lake Ferry followed a Fraser's Landing–Procter–Gray Creek route. When changed to Balfour–Kootenay Bay in 1947, Procter was dropped.

The stop was 16.1 kilometres (10.0 mi) northwest of Blake, and 4.0 kilometres (2.5 mi) east of Sunshine Bay. Passenger service ended in 1964. In 1986, the station was demolished.

CP Train Timetables (Regular stop or Flag stop)
Year	Mile	1909^{a}	1912	1916^{a}	1919^{a}	1929^{a}	1932	1935	1939	1943	1948	1953	1955	1960	1963
Ref.															
Procter	117.5	Reg	Reg	Reg	Reg	Reg	Reg	Reg	Reg	Reg	Reg	Reg/Flag	Reg	Flag	Flag
Sunshine Bay	119.9					Flag	Flag	Flag	Flag	Flag	Flag	Flag			
Harrop	122.2					Flag	Flag	Reg	Reg	Reg	Reg	Reg/Flag	Reg/Flag	Flag	Flag

^a. steamer only

== Early community ==
In 1903, Gilbert and Lily Snow bought the Procter's lodge, refurbishing it with a 20-room addition as the Outlet Hotel. In 1906, George Hale and Thomas Glendenning erected a sawmill, called the Procter Lumber Co. In 1908, Fred Sammons built the first general store. A porch area became a barbershop in the late 1920s and the store premises a pool hall a decade later. In 1909, Robert Walton built a large general store. In 1911, he erected an adjacent storage area, which was also used as a hall for community events. Several lessors or owners followed before relocating to new premises in the late 1930s. In the evenings, the local men would gather in the store for topical conversation.

Around 1910, Andrew Gallup built a large two-storey hall which hosted community events. That year, the government wharf and the wagon road to Harrop were built, and the Procter school opened in temporary accommodation. A one-room schoolhouse, and Presbyterian and Anglican churches were built in 1913. Growth in the settlement reached a plateau just prior to World War I. When the sawmill burned in 1912, some employment existed at the recently opened jam factory, which itself closed around 1920. Billy and Sarah Ward bought the hotel in 1919 and erected a small store at the rear. In 1923, the City of Nelson Power and Light introduced electricity and Gallup's hall burned to the ground. At the time, Sammons pool hall was also used for stage productions. The next year, the school became a superior school, the only one in the area offering junior high courses. Also, Syd Blackmore opened his hall, where his showing of silent movies was popular. A heavy snowfall collapsed that hall in 1932.

In 1925, the inauguration of the Harrop–Long Beach ferry provided road access. A Nelson–Procter jitney stage service commenced at that time, but does not appear to have operated throughout the winter. In 1928, this service ceased with the opening of the Nelson–Kaslo bus route, which the following year was branded as Greyhound. However, Percy Bennett's eight-seater car provided a passenger service from Procter until 1940.

In 1931, the opening of the rail link spelled the end of Procter as a transport hub. In 1938, the community hall and Catholic church were built. The population dwindled after World War II. On buying the Outlet hotel in 1944, Bill Kline renamed it the Holiday Inn. A bus service operated from 1947 until the early 1950s.

From the 1950s, senior grades were bussed to Nelson and the school became elementary only. In 1957, when the orange bridge replaced the cable ferry to the north shore at Nelson, ferry services ceased at Procter. In 1963, the Anglican church closed. After several owners, the hotel was demolished in 1966.

== Notable people ==
Walter Balls-Headley (1841–1918), eminent Australian gynaecologist, was a resident 1910–1918.

Ian Carne (1923–2011), senior public servant, was a childhood resident.

Alec Garner (1897–1995), painter, was a resident from 1944.

George Kinney (1872–1961), religious minister and mountaineer, was a resident from 1925–1934.

== Later community ==
Since the 1970s, Procter has primarily been a retirement and weekend retreat community. A barge continued to serve Kaslo and Lardeau until 1977, when Sunshine Bay's piers closed permanently. In 1986, the United Church closed. The next year, schooling was consolidated to the north shore at Redfish Elementary. The post office closed in the 1990s. The Church of the Sacred Heart (Catholic) still holds services. The former schoolhouse (1913) houses a library, small businesses and services. Tenants included the Procter Village Bakery, which ran for about 20 years before closing in 2018. After renovations in 2020, the bakery was renamed the Procter Village Café, but closed in 2021. The Procter general store includes a liquor agency, gas and propane. Kootenay Storytelling Festival is held each July.
