= Lockhart Beach Provincial Park =

Provincial park in British Columbia, Canada

- IUCN category II (national park)
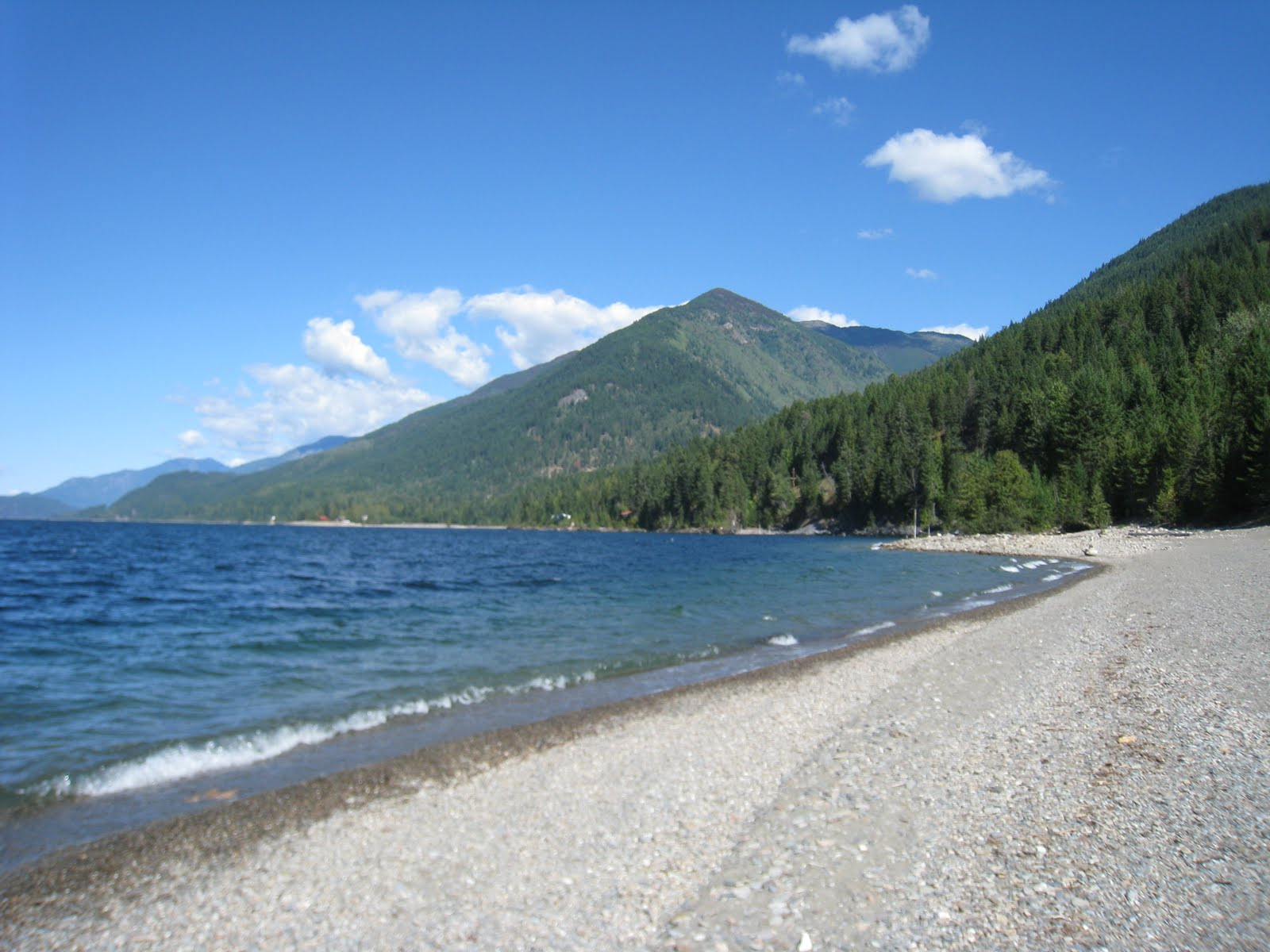
- Panoramic view

- Location within British Columbia
- Interactive map of Lockhart Beach Provincial Park
- Location: British Columbia, Canada
- Nearest city: Creston
- Coordinates: 49°30′32″N 116°47′13″W
- Area: 0.03 km^{2} (0.012 sq mi)
- Established: October 13, 1933
- Governing body: BC Parks

Lockhart Beach Provincial Park is a provincial park Located 40 km north of Creston, British Columbia, Canada, on BC Highway 3A. "This park and the adjacent Lockhart Creek Provincial Park extend 3 hectares (7.4 acres), from the sunny shores of Kootenay Lake to the headwaters of Lockhart Creek. "This small park provides the only easy access to public camping along the south arm of Kootenay Lake. An 18-site campground and day-use area are located near a sand and fine gravel beach."

== Activities ==
- Canoeing: There are paddling, canoeing, and kayaking opportunities at this park.
- Fishing: There are fishing opportunities in Kootenay Lake, especially for Gerrad Rainbow trout.
- Hiking: The adjacent Lockhart Creek Provincial Park has a well-maintained hiking trail that follows the north side of Lockhart Creek gaining about 800 metres (2,600 ft) of elevation over a 3-hour hike.
- Swimming: There are swimming opportunities in Kootenay Lake at this park. There are no lifeguards on duty at provincial parks.
