= Marron River =

Location
- Country: Canada
- Province: British Columbia

Physical characteristics
- Source: Aeneas Lake
  - location: Northwest of Marron Valley
  - coordinates: 49°23′46″N 119°41′46″W
  - elevation: 2,116 ft (645 m)
- Mouth: An unnamed lake
  - location: West of Skaha Lake
  - coordinates: 49°21′49″N 119°36′06″W
  - elevation: 1,421 ft (433 m)

The Marron River is a very small and short river in southern British Columbia, located just west of Skaha Lake at a length of 7.8 km.

== Course ==
The Marron River originates in small Aeneas Lake, which is located about 7.8 km west of Skaha Lake, at the head of the Marron Valley (Marron Valley is also the name of the local community). The river flows southeast for about 2 kilometers until it enters the second lake along its course, Marron Lake. Marama Creek, the river’s only officially named tributary, enters the lake’s south shore. The river, after exiting Marron Lake, flows northeast for about 3.1 km as it continues its way down Marron Valley toward Skaha Lake. The river than turns southeast & flows that way for another 3.1 km until it reaches a small, unnamed lake just west of Skaha Lake.

== Mouth ==
The Marron River’s mouth is somewhat different than the mouths of many other British Columbia rivers in the sense that it ends in a lake with no outlet. The river enters an unnamed lake that is located about 0.4 km west of Skaha that has no above-ground outlet. There is likely an underground outlet that carries the outflow from the lake somewhere else (possibly Skaha Lake).

== Naming ==
The river may have been first called the River of the Wild Horses back in 1833 by botanist David Douglas. The river was given its current name in 1871. The word Marron is French and it has several meanings. One of them is "domestic animal that has become wild". According to Mrs. William Allen and Mr. F. M. Buckland, a lot of wild horses roamed the area around the river, which is likely why the river was given the name it was in reference to the wild horses that roamed the surrounding terrain.

The river’s source lake, Aeneas Lake, was named after a member of the Indigenous peoples of the Americas by the name of Little Aeneas. He lived at the south end of the lake, alone, for many years before dying at over 100 years old.

== See also ==
- List of rivers of British Columbia
