= Norman H. Woods =

American golf course architect

Norman H. Woods (1908–1987) was an important North American golf course architect who designed many courses in Canada and the United States. He apprenticed under course designer Stanley Thompson and he was a member of the American Society of Golf Course Architects from 1954 until 1976. He died in 1987.

== Courses designed ==
(Not an exhaustive list)

- Broadmoor Public Golf Course, Sherwood Park, Alberta, Canada
- Capitol City Golf Club, Lacey, Washington, US
- Glendale Golf and Country Club, Edmonton, Alberta, Canada
- Highlands Golf Club, Billings, Montana, US
- Kokanee Springs Resort, Crawford Bay, British Columbia, Canada
- Lords Valley Country Club, Hawley, Pennsylvania, US
- Marias Valley Golf Club, Shelby, Montana, US
- Nile Shrine Golf Course, Mountlake Terrace, Washington, US
- Rossmere Country Club, Winnipeg, Manitoba, Canada
- Signal Point Golf Club, Fort Benton, Montana, US
- Stony Plain Golf Course, Stony Plain, Alberta, Canada
- Falcon Lake Golf Course, Whiteshell Provincial Park, Manitoba, Canada
- Revelstoke Golf Club, Revelstoke, British Columbia, Canada
- Hirsch Creek Golf Course Front Nine (Kitimat, British Columbia)
