= Crawford Bay, British Columbia =

Crawford Bay
- Village
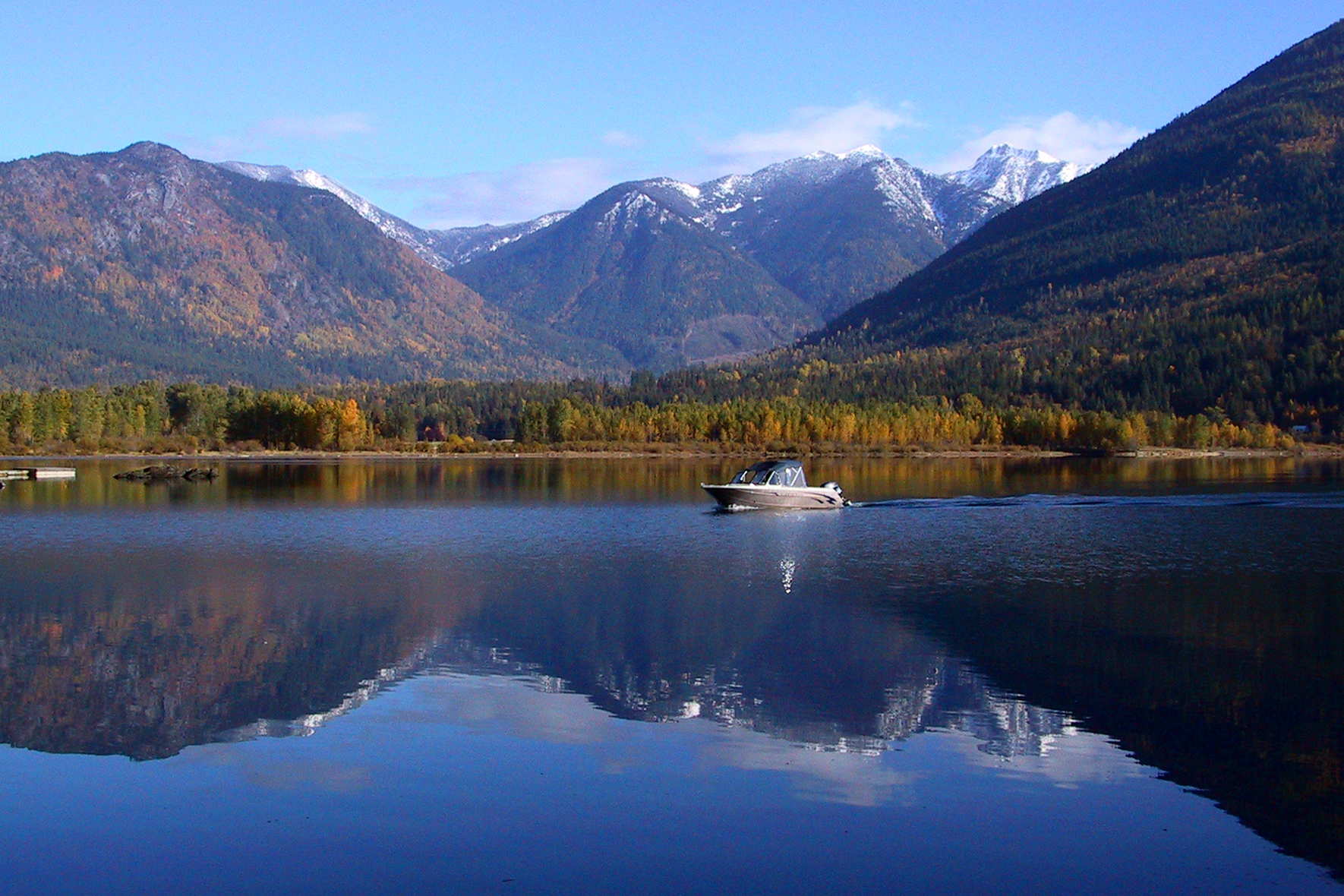
- Crawford Bay as viewed from Kootenay Lake.

- Location of Crawford Bay in British Columbia
- Coordinates: 49°41′00″N 116°49′00″W
- Country: Canada
- Province: British Columbia
- Region: West Kootenay
- Regional district: Central Kootenay

Area
  - Land: 13.31 km^{2} (5.14 sq mi)
- Highest elevation: 1,030 m (3,380 ft)
- Lowest elevation: 524 m (1,719 ft)

Population (2016)
  - Total: 304
  - Density: 22.8/km^{2} (59/sq mi)
- Time zone: UTC−7 (MST)
- Postal code: V0B 1E0
- Area codes: 250, 778, 236, & 672
- Highways: Highway 3A
- Waterways: Kootenay Lake; Crawford Creek

Crawford Bay is a community of approximately 350 people, situated in the Purcell mountain range on the eastern shore of Kootenay Lake in the West Kootenay region of southeastern British Columbia. This location on Highyway 3A is 76 kilometres (47 mi) by road north of Creston and 48 kilometres (29.8 mi) by road and ferry northeast across Kootenay Lake from Nelson.

== History, geography, demographics and economy ==
The region is part of the traditional territories of the Syilx, Sinixt and Ktunaxa peoples. The Ktunaxa name for the bay is kʼupawiȼknuk, meaning "where the lake goes inland." Prospector and trapper, James Crawford, whom the Ktunaxa called White Man Jim, reportedly gave his name to the bay and creek. However, the settlement itself was Cocklethorpe for the first decade, named after Joseph William Cockle, who obtained the first preemption in 1889.

== Arts, culture, attractions and sports ==
Crawford Bay plays host to a music festival each July. The Starbelly Jam, an annual event since 1999, is a weekend outdoor music festival featuring a wide variety of musical styles.

The village centre, along Highway 3A, is home to a collection of working artisan studios including: a forge, broom makers, potters, weavers, copper enamellists, leatherworkers, and jewellers.

Crawford Bay hosts an annual autumn agricultural fair, The Kootenay Lake Fall Fair, which dates back to 1910 and features a juried display of locally grown produce, homemade goods and artistic creations.

Kokanee Springs Golf Resort, located within Crawford Bay, is a championship 18-hole course designed by Norman H. Woods in 1968.

== Government and infrastructure ==
A good Gray Creek–Crawford Bay–Kootenay Bay trail was constructed in 1908, improving the steep trail over the ridge separating the latter two places. The ridge trail upgraded to a wagon road in 1912. The Creston–Kuskonook road was extended northward in 1927, reaching Gray Creek in 1931. Kuskonook–Kootenay Bay was upgraded to a highway and paved 1947–1949.

The Regional District of Central Kootenay (RDCK) is the local governing body for Crawford Bay. The village lies within Electoral Area A in the RDCK and the current director for Area A is Garry Jackman. Provincially, Crawford Bay lies within the electoral riding of Nelson-Creston, currently represented in the provincial legislature by NDP MLA Michelle Mungall. Federally, Crawford Bay is part of the Kootenay-Columbia riding, currently represented by NDP MP Wayne Stetski.

== Education and media ==
The local Crawford Bay School, offers kindergarten to Grade 12 and serves the entire eastern shore of Kootenay Lake. In 2009, with the old school at the end of its lifetime and no longer adequate for the communities' needs, a new school building was constructed on a larger piece of land nearby. It became the first school in British Columbia to meet the LEED Green Building Rating System requirements. The school design also received a "Wood WORKS! Community Recognition Award" from the Canada Wood Council.

Also serving the "east shore" community, which includes Crawford Bay, is a local newspaper called The Eastshore Mainstreet. The paper is published monthly and focuses on local issues and events.

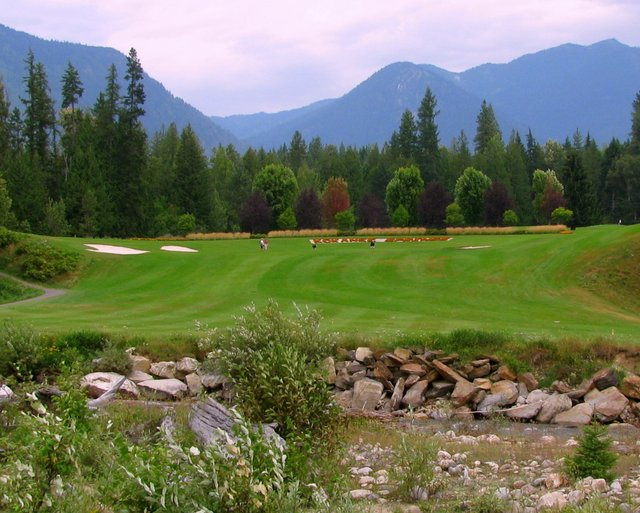
Kokanee Springs Golf Course, Crawford Bay, British Columbia, Canada, 2013.

== Notable residents ==
- Baba Brinkman, Canadian rapper and playwright born in the nearby town of Riondel and a graduate of Crawford Bay School.
- Tom "Comet" Hulland, stunt performer and special effects artist born in the area. Tom has worked with Madonna, Penn and Teller and Sir Richard Branson, among others. Tom also held the world record for three chainsaw juggling (44 throws).

== See also ==
- Riondel
- Kootenays
- Kootenay Lake
- Crawford Bay Airport
- Nelson, British Columbia
- Creston, British Columbia
