= Balfour, British Columbia =

Balfour
- unincorporated community
- Location of Balfour
- Coordinates: 49°38′N 116°58′W
- Country: Canada
- Province: British Columbia
- Region: West Kootenay
- Regional District: Central Kootenay

Government
  - Governing body: Nelson City Council
  - MP: Alex Atamanenko (NDP)
  - MLA: Corky Evans (NDP)

Area
  - Land: 3.72 km^{2} (1.44 sq mi)
- Elevation: 571 m (1,873 ft)

Population (2016)
  - Total: 459
  - Density: 123.4/km^{2} (320/sq mi)
- Time zone: UTC−08:00 (PST)
  - Summer (DST): UTC−07:00 (PDT)
- Area codes: 250, 778, 236, & 672
- Highways: Highway 3A; Highway 31

Balfour is an unincorporated community in the West Kootenay region of southeastern British Columbia. The ferry terminal and former steamboat landing is on the north shore at the entrance to the West Arm of Kootenay Lake. The locality, on BC Highway 3A, is about 33 kilometres (21 mi) northeast of Nelson.

== Early settlers ==
For centuries, First Nations harvested huckleberries and fished in the area. In 1889, two preemptions were obtained at this location. By the summer of 1890, one recipient, civil engineer Charles Wesley Busk, established a general store and laid out a townsite. Likely named after Arthur Balfour, rival theories have existed. The next year Busk opened the Balfour House Hotel on his 200-acre (81 ha) orchard estate. William J. Sanders was the inaugural postmaster 1891–1892.

Encountering a liquidity problem, Busk sold everything except a large house set in a few surrounding acres. In 1891, Joseph and Mary Gallup bought the store and hotel in the growing community. That year, a telephone connection with Ainsworth and Nelson was established. The next year, the Anglican church opened. Around 1894, Thomas (Tom) Gregg Procter, of Procter's Landing, established the West Kootenay Brick Company on a clay deposit about 1 mile (1.6 km) downstream from the Balfour Hotel landing. The venture operated for about a decade. Developments at the Pilot Bay smelter across the lake boosted the local economy, but the 1896 smelter closure triggered a decade-long recession for Balfour. In 1897, a lighthouse was erected,

== Revival and recession ==
By 1907, a wave of immigrants to the lake, aspiring to be commercial orchardists, revived the settlement. Fraser's Landing existed 2 kilometres (1.2 mi) to the west. Sydney Smyth Fraser bought 400 acres (160 ha) and settled there in 1906. This was the western terminal for the Kootenay Lake Ferry 1931–1947.

In 1910, Tom Procter created the Riverside subdivision (Balfour Addition), northeast at the lake outlet, and encompassing the bench above Balfour. Riverside was perhaps a misnomer, because the Kootenay River does not commence until a few miles below Nelson. That year, Edith M. Middleton was the inaugural Balfour school teacher, and Charles Holt built a log cabin general store, which housed the post office and telephone exchange. Holt was postmaster 1914–1945. In the late 1940s, new owners installed Imperial gas pumps.

The first car travelled the new Balfour–Nelson road in 1914, but road conditions were harrowing until the 1930s. The Balfour–Queens Bay road was completed about 1912 and Balfour–Kaslo in 1925. A bus service from Nelson began in 1922 and through to Kaslo in 1928, the operator being rebranded as Greyhound the following year.

After years of inhabiting a temporary building, a permanent schoolhouse opened in 1924. The onset of the Great Depression collapsed the fruit industry. Years of planning for a cemetery preceded the first burial in 1931. In the 1930s, a one-bay garage with a single Shell gas pump was established.

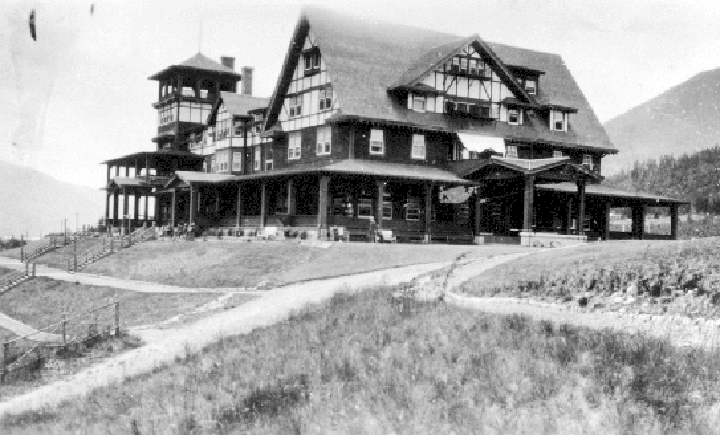
Former CP hotel at Balfour, 1918

== CP hotel ==
The Canadian Pacific Railway (CP) hotel planned for the bench was named as Riverside, but changed after strong local protest. The 50-room Hotel Kootenay Lake, set in formal gardens and serviced by an aerial tramway from the shoreline, opened in 1911. The hotel was across the west arm from the western terminal of the CP Procter–Kootenay Landing lake-boat route. The 1913 recession killed the business and the hotel closed in 1914, near the outbreak of World War I. In 1917, the building served as a convalescent home for lung-damaged war veterans. In 1919, Edward, Prince of Wales visited. The next year, patients were relocated, and the sanitorium remained vacant until demolished in 1929.

== Recreation and tourism ==
In 1913, Alfred H. Green bought a property on which two summer cottages stood. He built a grandiose home and seven further cottages. Until 1920, sanitorium employees rented the cottages. From the 1920s, the whole property catered to vacationers. In 1947, the cottages were separated from the Balfour Beach Inn (former home). The inn has undergone several upgrades and expansions over the decades. The other buildings became Westlake Cottages, which operated as a resort until the land was subdivided for residences in the early 1980s.

In 1947, Ken and Roberta (Bobby) Chandler built the Tillicum Inn, which contained a popular restaurant. In the early 1990s, the building was expanded and became Dockers Pub. In 2007, a multi-million dollar renovation added a further 465 square metres (5,000 sq ft) and a rename to Dock 'n' Duck.

Balfour Golf Course occupies the former CP hotel site. The 9-hole course, opened in 1990, was expanded to an 18-hole, championship course in 2002. An RV park and campground exists at the western end of Balfour.

== Later community ==
Balfour has subsumed Fraser's Landing and Riverside. In 1987, schooling was consolidated at Redfish Elementary to the west. Since relocating from Fraser's Landing in 1947, the western terminal for the Kootenay Lake Ferry has become the commercial centre comprising a bakery, pub, marina restaurant, and two retail stores. A postal agency and a small supermarket/liquor outlet exist on the highway. The latter had relocated in 1954 and the floor space has since been enlarged twice.

Apart from the British Columbia Ministry of Transportation and Infrastructure ferry terminal, Balfour has primarily been a retirement and weekend retreat community. The West Kootenay Transit System routes 10 and 76 stop at the ferry terminal. The census population was 459 in 2016, 477 in 2011, and 479 in 2006. In 2020, the Balfour and District Business and Historic Association acquired the Anglican church building, services having ceased the prior year.
