= Embalming chemicals =

Chemicals that prevent body decomposition

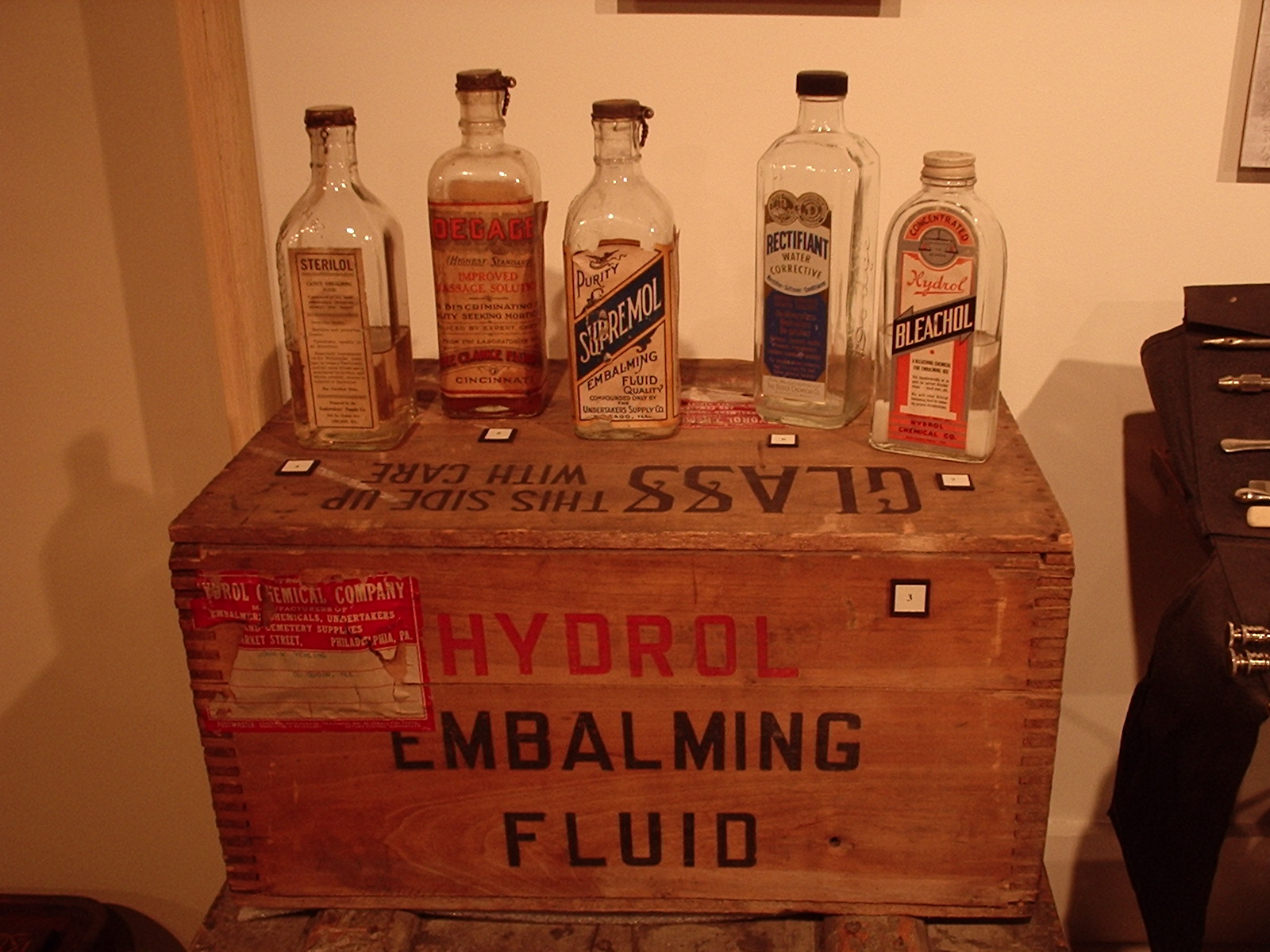
Various early 20th century embalming fluids

Embalming chemicals are a variety of preservatives, sanitising and disinfectant agents, and additives used in modern embalming to temporarily prevent decomposition and restore a natural appearance for viewing a body after death in funeral homes. A mixture of these chemicals is known as embalming solution and is used to preserve bodies of deceased persons for both funeral purposes and in medical research in anatomical laboratories. Embalming fluid refers to the fluid purchased from companies containing preservative chemicals. The period for which a body is embalmed is dependent on time, expertise of the embalmer and factors regarding duration of stay and purpose.

Typically, embalming fluid contains a mixture of formaldehyde, glutaraldehyde, methanol, and other solvents. The formaldehyde content generally ranges from 5–37% and the methanol content may range from 9–56%.

In the United States alone, about 20 million liters (roughly 5.3 million gallons) of embalming fluid are used every year.

== Method of operation ==
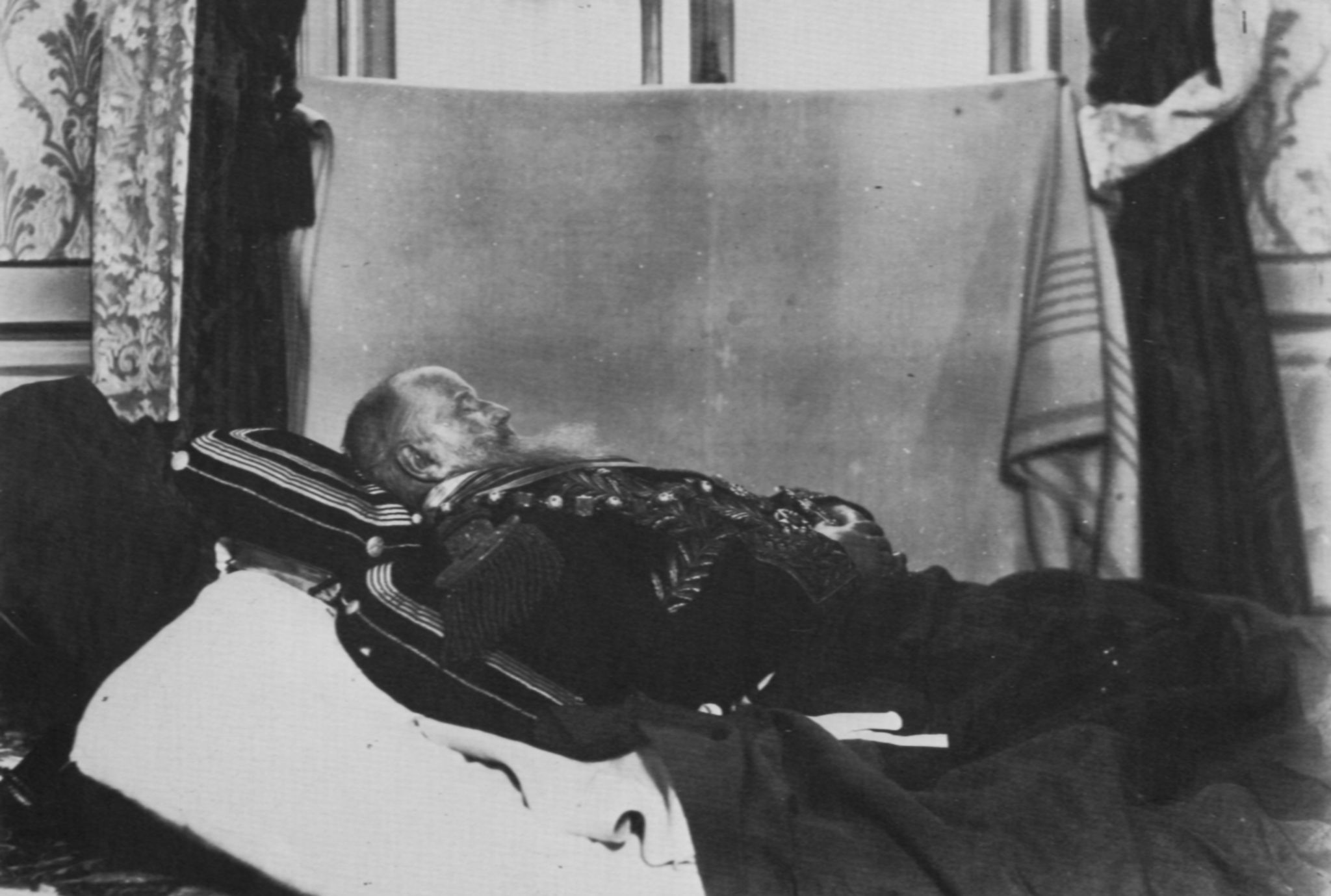
The body of Emperor Pedro II of Brazil (pictured on his bier in 1891) was embalmed by injecting six liters (1.585 U.S. gallons) of zinc and aluminum hydrochloride into the common carotid artery. In 1912, archivist Luís Gastão d'Escragnolle Dória documented the state of preservation of the remains after observing them through the crystal-paned lead inner shell of his triple coffin, noting that his features were still recognizable. (Note: Despite recognizing the body's overall preservation, d'Escragnolle Dória felt the embalming had altered the emperor's appearance over time, describing him as "small and weathered", with skin resembling "old wax" and a beard turned "aged ivory".)

Embalming fluid acts to fix (denature) cellular proteins, meaning that they cannot act as a nutrient source for bacteria; embalming fluid also kills the bacteria themselves. Formaldehyde or glutaraldehyde fixes tissue or cells by irreversibly connecting a primary amine group in a protein molecule with a nearby nitrogen atom in a protein or DNA molecule through a -CH_{2}- linkage called a Schiff base. The end result also creates the simulation, via color changes, of the appearance of blood flowing under the skin.

Modern embalming is not done with a single fixative. Instead, various chemicals are used to create a mixture, called an arterial solution, which is uniquely generated for the needs of each case. For example, a body needing to be repatriated overseas needs a higher index (percentage of diluted preservative chemical) than one simply for viewing (known in the United States and Canada as a funeral visitation) at a funeral home prior to burial for a cemetery, entombment for a mausoleum or cremation in a crematorium.

== Process ==
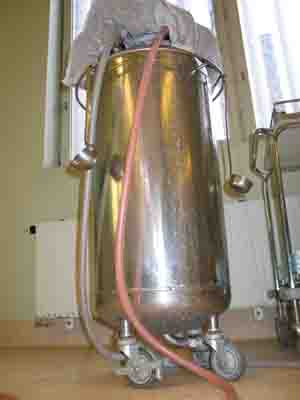
Tank containing embalming fluid

Embalming fluid is injected into the arterial system of the deceased and blood is allowed to drain from the venous system. This is known as arterial embalming. Then, a trocar is inserted into the abdominal cavity. The organs in the chest, and abdominal, and pelvic cavities are then punctured and drained of gas and fluid contents. The body contents are then replaced with a specialty fluid known as cavity fluid. This is known as cavity embalming.

== Chemicals and additives ==
It is important to distinguish between an arterial chemical (or fluid), which is generally taken to be the product in its original composition, and an arterial solution, which is a diluted mixture of chemicals and made to order for each body. Non-preservative chemicals in an arterial solution are generally called "accessory chemicals" or co/pre-injectants, depending on their time of utilization.

Potential ingredients in an arterial solution include:

- Preservative (Arterial) Chemical. These are commonly a percentage (normally 18–37%) based mixture of formaldehyde, glutaraldehyde or in some cases phenol which are then diluted to gain the final index of the arterial solution. Methanol is used to hold the formaldehyde in solution. Formalin refers specifically to 37% aqueous formaldehyde and is not commonly used in funeral embalming but rather in the preservation of anatomical specimens.
- Water Conditioner. These are designed to balance the "hardness" of water (the presence of other trace chemicals that change the water's pH or neutrality) and to help reduce the deceased's acidity, a by-product of decomposition, as formaldehyde works best in an alkaline environment. Additionally, water conditioners may be used to help inactivate chemotherapy drugs and antibiotics, which may bind to and render ineffectual the preservative chemical.
- Cell Conditioner. These chemicals act to prepare cells for absorption of arterial fluid and help break up clots in the bloodstream.
- Dyes. Active dyes are used to restore the body's natural colouration and counterstain against conditions such as jaundice as well as to indicate distribution of arterial fluid. Inactive dyes are used by the manufacturer of the arterial fluid to give a pleasant color to the fluid in the bottle but do nothing for the appearance of the embalmed body.
- Humectants. These are added to dehydrated and emaciated bodies to help restore tissue to a more natural and hydrated appearance.
- Anti-Edemic Chemicals. The opposite of humectants, these are designed to draw excessive fluid (edema) from a body.
- Additional Disinfectants. For certain cases, such as tissue gas, speciality chemicals such as Omega Decomp Factor, Triton-28, STOP or Dispray (Topical) can be arterially injected to kill tissue gas.
- Water. Most arterial solutions are a mix of some of the preceding chemicals with tepid water. Cases done without the addition of water are referred to as "waterless." Waterless embalming is more common in difficult cases or those requiring a very high degree of preservation, such as instances of an extended delay between death and final disposition.
- Cavity Fluid. This is a generally a very high-index formaldehyde or glutaraldehyde solution injected undiluted directly via the trocar incision into the body cavities to treat the viscera. In cases of tissue gas, phenol based products are often used instead.

== History ==
Prior to the advent of the modern range of embalming chemicals a variety of alternative additives have been used by embalmers, including epsom salts for edema cases, but these are of limited effectiveness, as the validity of their use has never been demonstrated by professional embalmers or mortuary science programs.

During the American Civil War, the Union Army, wanting to transport dead soldiers from the battlefields back home for burial, consulted with Dr. Thomas Holmes, who developed a technique that involved draining a corpse's blood and embalming it with a fluid made with arsenic for preservation.

Embalming chemicals are generally produced by specialist manufacturers. The oldest embalming fluid company was founded as the Hill Fluid Company, in 1878 and the Hill Fluid Company was incorporated only 10 years later, in 1888, as the Champion Chemical Company under the direction of Dr. A. A. Bakker making the Champion Company the oldest fluid company in the world at 147 years old and still in operation and still family owned and operated. The Frigid Fluid Company was founded in 1892, followed by the Dodge Company in 1893, with other companies including Egyptian, now U.S. Chemical, as well as Kelco Supply Company (formerly L H Kellogg), Pierce Chemical Company (now owned by The Wilbert Company), Bondol Chemical Company, and Hydrol Chemical Company. There are many smaller and regional producers as well. Some funeral homes produce their own embalming fluids, although this practice has declined in recent decades as commercially available products have become of better quality and more readily available.

Following the EU Biocides Legislation some pressure was brought to reduce the use of formaldehyde. IARC Classes Formaldehyde as a Class 1 Carcinogen. With the introduction of Glutaraldehyde and phenol based fluids by the Champion Company, Lower exposure fluids are on the market and are safer compared to HCHO based fluids. Though some will argue that those fluids do not preserve, attention can be made to Leandro Rendon, one of Champion's former chemist who did receive a US patent in 1974, giving proof that non HCHO fluid not only sanitize, but also do preserve.

== Environmental effects ==
Despite genuine concerns, formaldehyde is a naturally occurring substance, of which human beings produce approximately 1.5 oz a day as a normal part of a healthy metabolism. Formaldehyde also occurs naturally in many fruits, such as bananas, apples, and carrots, and does not bioaccumulate in either plants or animals.

Formaldehyde works to fixate the tissue of the deceased. This is the characteristic that also makes concentrated formaldehyde hazardous when not handled using appropriate personal protective equipment. The carbon atom in formaldehyde, CH_{2}O, carries a slight positive charge due to the high electronegativity of the oxygen double bonded with the carbon. The electropositive carbon will react with a negatively charged molecule and other electron-rich species. As a result, the carbon in the formaldehyde molecule bonds with electron-rich nitrogen groups called amines found in plant and animal tissue. This leads to formaldehyde cross-linking, bonding proteins with other proteins and DNA, rendering them dysfunctional or no longer useful. This is the reason for usage of formaldehyde as a preservative, as it thus prevents cellular decay and renders the tissue unsuitable for use as a nutrient source for bacteria.

Formaldehyde is carcinogenic in humans and animals at excessive levels because the cross-linking can cause DNA to keep cells from halting the replication process. This unwarranted replication of cells can lead to cancer. Unicellular organisms found in the soil and groundwater are also quite sensitive to cross-linking, experiencing damage at a concentration of 0.3 mg to 22 mg per liter. Formaldehyde also affects aquatic invertebrates, with crustaceans being the most sensitive type. The range of concentration damaging them is 0.4 mg to 20 mg per liter.

Formaldehyde released from the cremation of embalmed bodies enters the atmosphere and can remain suspended for up to 250 hours. It is readily soluble in water so it will bond with moisture in the atmosphere and rain down onto plants, animals, and water supplies below. As a result, formaldehyde content in precipitation can range from 110 μg to 1380 μg per liter. These concerns notwithstanding, according to the American Chemistry Council, formaldehyde, as a ubiquitous chemical produced by living beings, is eminently degradable by both sunlight in air and by bacteria in soil and water.

It may be worth noting that although the American Chemistry Council (an organization of chemical producers, many of whom profit from the sale of formaldehyde) asserts that formaldehyde is biodegradable, including through sunlight, an independent study which examined methods of inducing formaldehyde degradation found that UV photolysis caused "no photodecomposition." A separate study also assessed the environmental impact of 45 organic chemicals from the EPA's Toxic Release Inventory, which keeps track of the most common toxic pollutants in the environment, and found formaldehyde to be the most toxic out of all 45.

The growth of the environment movement has caused some people to consider green burials where there are either no aldehyde-based chemicals used in the embalming process, or there is no embalming process at all. Embalming fluid meeting specific criteria for such burials is commercially available, and although it is not as effective as aldehyde-based solutions, is approved by the Green Burial Association of America. The Champion Chemical Company became the first company to produce 100% Formaldehyde Free Fluids in the early 1990's and those chemicals are still sold and in use today. Another major stride in embalming fluid came in 2010, when again, the Champion Chemical Company produced and introduced their Enigma Line of Green Embalming Chemicals that have almost no impact whatsoever on the environment. ^{[citation needed]} Their products are the only green fluids on the market that are certified by the Green Burial Council and met their rigorous certification requirements.

== See also ==
- Glass House (British Columbia) – a building in British Columbia constructed with empty embalming fluid bottles
