= Glass House (British Columbia) =

Coordinates: 49.4050°N 116.7416°W

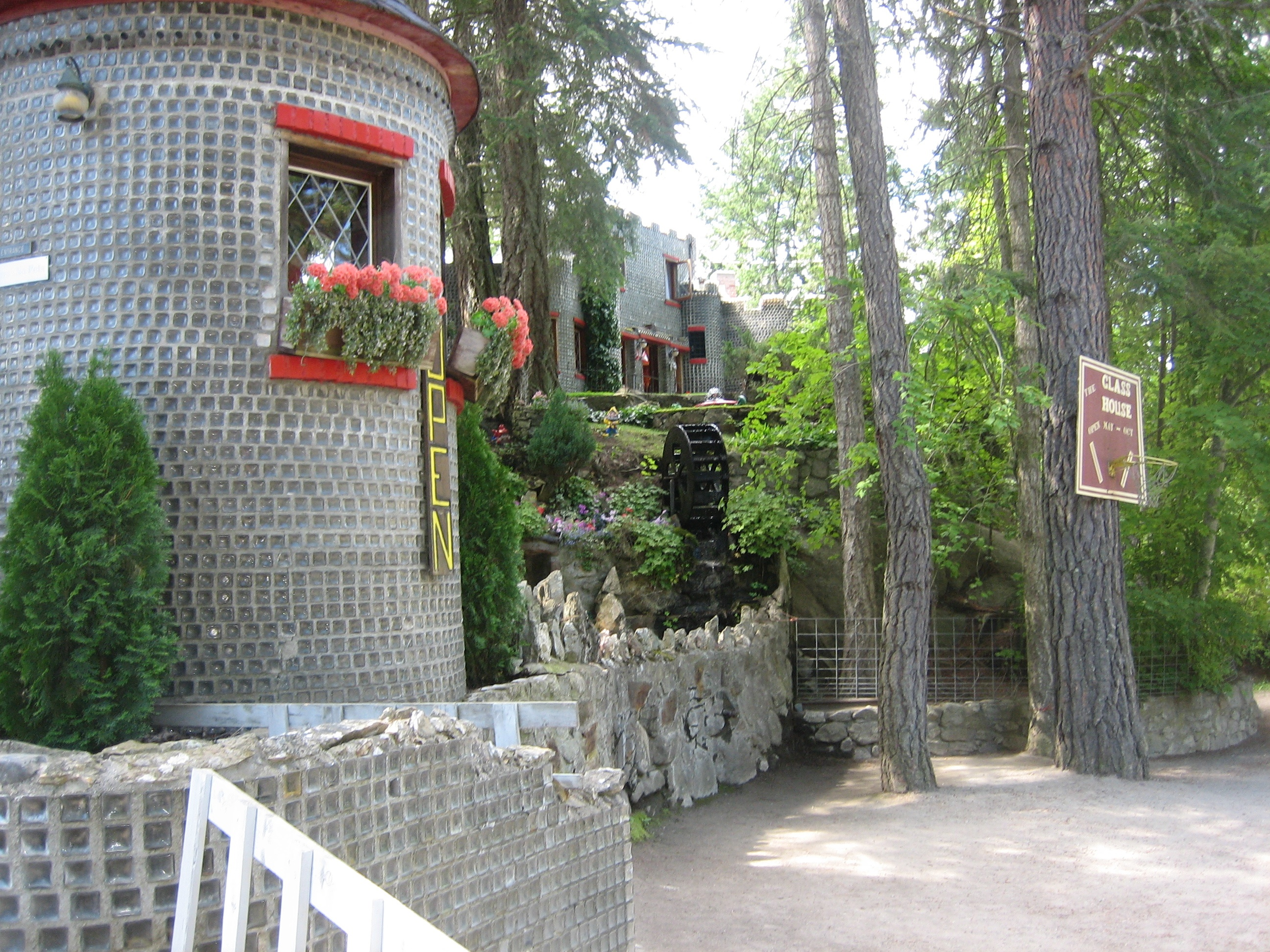
Glass house entrance

The Glass House, built by David H. Brown, is located on the east shore of Kootenay Lake in British Columbia near the rural locality of Boswell, British Columbia. Construction started in 1952 in order to, according to a quote left by Mr. Brown, "indulge a whim of a peculiar nature". Intended to be the Browns' home, the unusual construction and fantasy-castle appearance attracted traffic from the adjacent British Columbia Highway 3A (now part of the scenic International Selkirk Loop). The resulting loss of privacy led to the Browns' establishment of a roadside attraction in the summer months.

The Glass House sits upon solid rock overlooking Kootenay Lake and is constructed of approximately 500,000 empty embalming fluid bottles, which would have otherwise been discarded as waste. Built with a single layer of bottles laid with the short neck towards the inside, strips of wood were wired between the necks and reinforced with cement. The strips of wood then support the inner walls formed of cedar boards.

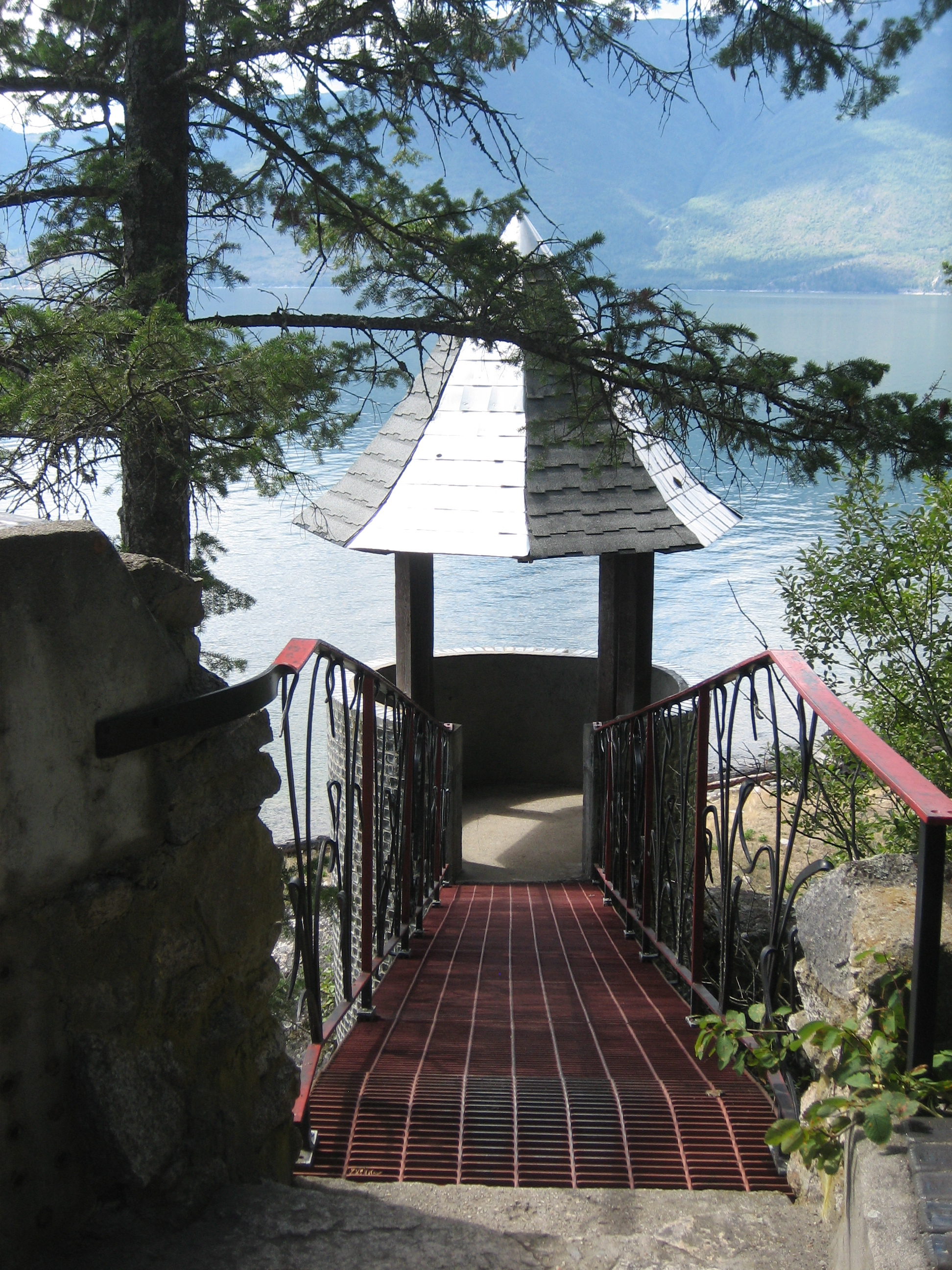
Glass house lookout

The main house is built like a three-leaf clover with the main rooms being circular. A short staircase in the center accounts for the different heights created by the rock on which the house sits. The main floor contains the living room with a large fireplace, the master bedroom, and a kitchen overlooking a terrace. A second bedroom resides upstairs, off-limits to visitors, and brings the total square footage to 1200 (approximately 111 square metres). Additional structures include a wishing well with waterwheel, an archway, a garden shed, a bridge, several towers, and many stone stairs and pathways. These additional buildings are also primarily constructed with the same technique as the house.
