= British Columbia Highway 3A =

Highway in British Columbia, Canada

Highway 3A
- Highway 3A highlighted in red

Route information
- Maintained by the Ministry of Transportation and Infrastructure
- Existed: 1964–present
- Tourist routes: Part of the International Selkirk Loop

Castlegar-Nelson-Creston Highway
- Length: 154 km (96 mi)
- West end: Highway 3 in Castlegar
- Major intersections: Highway 6 north at South Slocan; Highway 6 south at Nelson; Highway 31 at Balfour; Kootenay Lake Ferry
- East end: Highway 3 in Creston

Keremeos-Kaleden Junction Highway
- Length: 32 km (20 mi)
- West end: Highway 3 in Keremeos
- East end: Highway 97 near Kaleden

Location
- Country: Canada
- Province: British Columbia
- Major cities: Castlegar, Nelson
- Towns: Creston

Highway system
- British Columbia provincial highways
← Highway 3	→ Highway 3B

Highway 3A is the designation of two segments of highway in the southern part of British Columbia.

== Castlegar-Nelson-Creston Highway ==
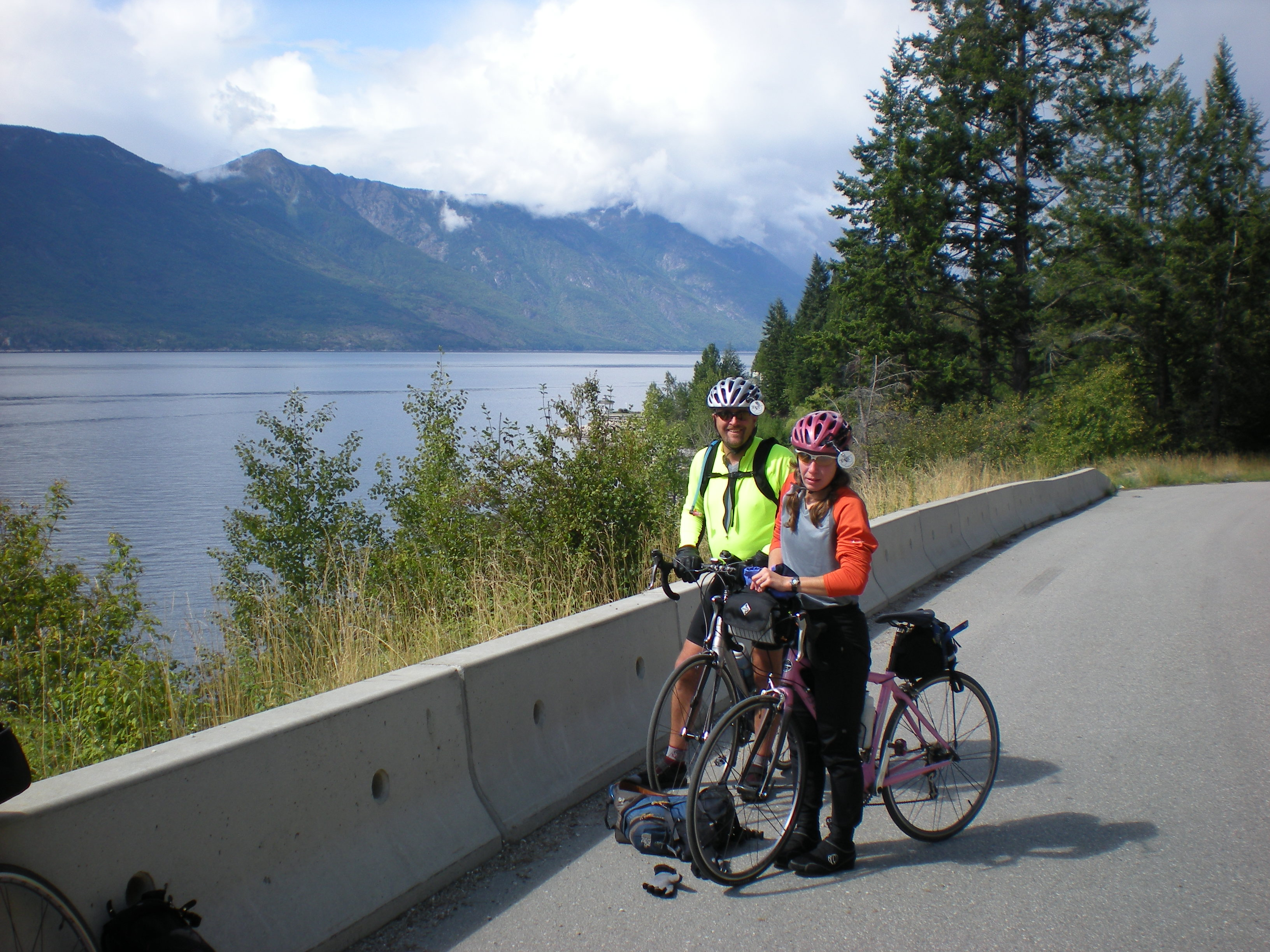
Cyclists along British Columbia Highway 3A near Kootenay Lake.

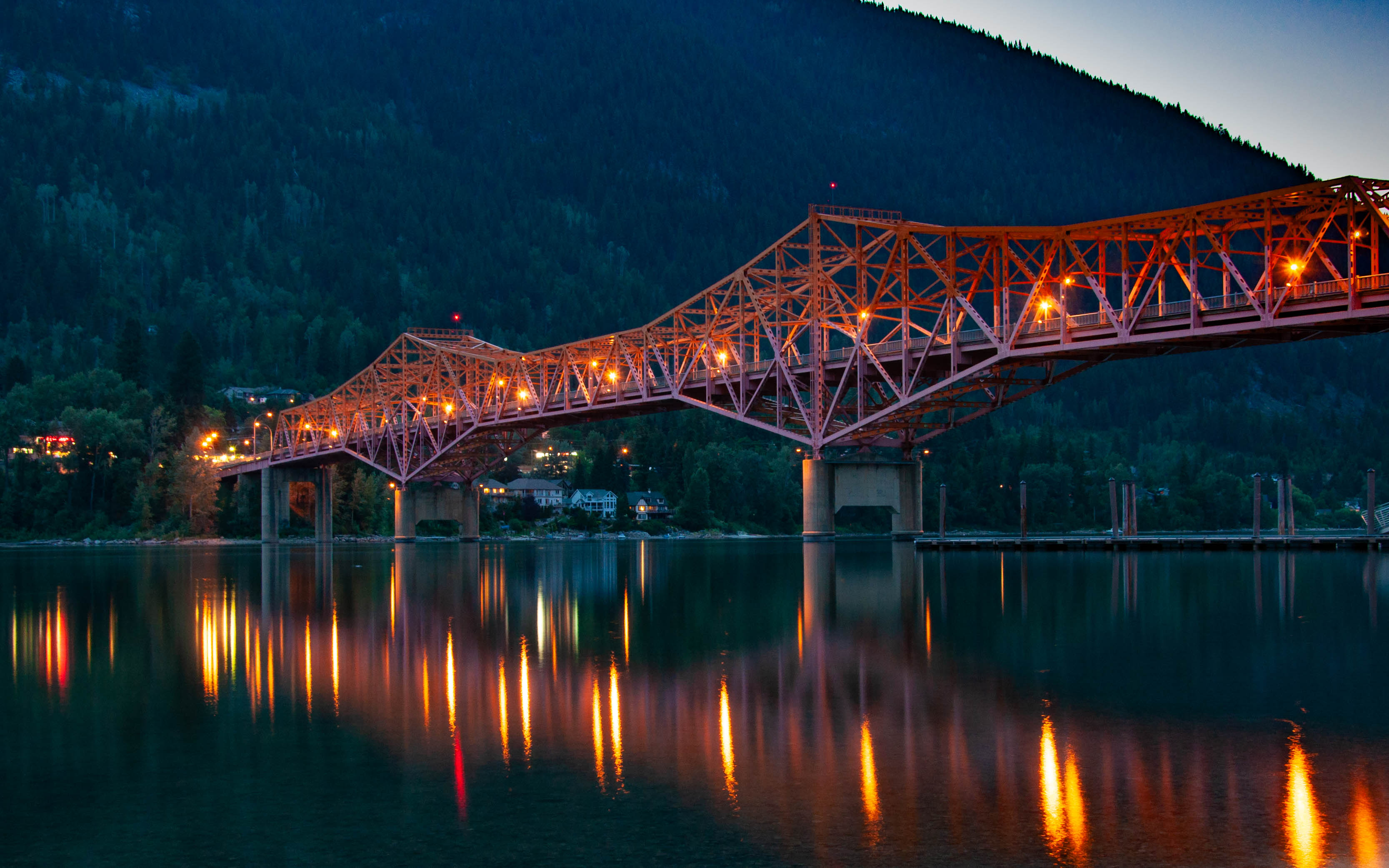
The "Big Orange Bridge" carries Highway 3A over the Kootenay Lake (West Arm) in Nelson.

This was the first segment of highway in British Columbia to receive the '3A' designation. It acquired this designation when the Crowsnest Highway was routed into the Kootenay Pass area in 1964. Originally, a ferry was used to route Highway 3A over the Columbia River near Castlegar, which was replaced by a bridge in 1967.

The 154 km (96 mi) long Kootenay section of Highway 3A begins at Castlegar, where it leaves Highway 3 and travels 20 km (12 mi) northeast to South Slocan, where Highway 6 merges onto Highway 3A. The two highways proceed east for 22 km (14 mi) to Nelson, where Highway 6 diverges south. 34 km (21 mi) northeast of Nelson, Highway 3A reaches Balfour, on the western shore of Kootenay Lake. A ferry takes Highway 3A across Kootenay Lake to Kootenay Bay. Highway 3A then follows the eastern shore of Kootenay Lake for 78 km (48 mi) south through Crawford Bay, Boswell, and Wynndel to Creston, where it rejoins Highway 3.

The 3A marker in Creston at the junction with the Kootenay pass route falsely advertises it as a northbound highway rather than a westbound highway although all other 3A markers properly describe it as west and eastbound just as the 3 main.

The Kootenay pass is prone to closures especially during avalanche season and when it is closed Highway 3A and the Kootenay Lake ferry once again becomes a vital link for all traffic on the Crowsnest highway which would otherwise completely cease to function. The ferry will operate on a 24h basis until the pass re opens.

Even when the pass is open and despite the pass route being shorter some Kootenay locals still personally prefer to drive the Kootenay Lake route rather than the Salmo Creston route viewing the ferry route as a safer option especially if the weather is bad or at risk of turning bad or if there are construction delays on the pass. It's possible for example for the entirety of 3A from Creston to Castlegar to be bare and dry while the pass is still covered in snow and ice. 3A is also a far easier bicycle route than the Kootenay pass. This combined with people who simply wish to experience a more relaxed drive means a significant minority of ferry users in a given week are using the ferry as part of a trip all the way to or from the coast just as it was used for before the pass route was built.

=== Major intersections ===
The entire route is in Central Kootenay Regional District.

Location	km	mi	Destinations	Notes
Castlegar	0.00	0.00	Highway 3 (Crowsnest Highway) – Grand Forks, Trail, Salmo, Creston	Ootischenia Interchange; Highway 3A western terminus
	3.22	2.00	Brilliant Bridge crosses the Kootenay River	
	3.60	2.24	Robson Road – Castlegar City Centre, Robson	Partially grade separated
	19.90	12.37	Highway 6 north – New Denver, Nakusp, Vernon	West end of Highway 6 concurrency
	34.45	21.41	Taghum Bridge crosses the Kootenay River	
Nelson	41.25	25.63	Highway 6 south to Highway 3 – Salmo	Cottonwood Creek Interchange; Highway 3A branches north; east end of Highway 6 concurrency
Nelson	41.71	25.92	Victoria Street	Eastbound exit only
Nelson	45.07– 45.70	28.01– 28.40	Nelson Bridge crosses Kootenay Lake (West Arm)	
Balfour	75.92	47.17	Highway 31 north – Ainsworth Hot Springs, Kaslo	Highway 3A branches south into ferry terminal
	76.08	47.27	Kootenay Lake Ferry crosses Kootenay Lake; Kilometrage does not include ferry	
Creston	154.26	95.85	Highway 3 (Crowsnest Highway) – Cranbrook, Salmo, Castlegar	Highway 3A eastern terminus
1.000 mi = 1.609 km; 1.000 km = 0.621 mi: Concurrency terminus; Incomplete access

== Keremeos-Kaleden Junction Highway ==
A new section of highway through the Richter Pass from Keremeos to Osoyoos was opened in 1965. The 2-lane Crowsnest Highway was re-routed through this area in 1967, and the segment between Keremeos and Osoyoos was given the Highway 3 Southern Trans-Canada designation. This 45 km (28 mi) long segment of Highway 3 runs south from Keremeos, past the turnoff to Nighthawk, USA, then east over Richter Pass to Osoyoos. It's a main part of the bike course for the Subaru Ironman held each August in the Okanagan-Similkameen. The event was known as Challenge Penticton Triathlon between 2013 and 2019 when Subaru withdrew its sponsorship and moved the event to Whistler. The event was reinstated to Penticton beginning in 2022.

Highway 3A runs from Keremeos 35 km (22 mi) north through Olalla and up the long hill to Yellow Lake, then east past Twin Lakes and through the Marron Valley to Kaleden Junction where it intersects with Highway 97, the North-South Okanagan route, 14 km (8.7 mi) south of Penticton. Highway 3A used to continue south along Highway 97, past Okanagan Falls and Oliver to Osoyoos, but the Highway 3A/97 concurrency has since been decommissioned. Signage at Kaleden junction and in Okanagan falls remains and a new 3A sign was installed as part of the reworking of the junction. The "Yellow Lake route" from Keremeos to Osoyoos is still considered a core part of highway 3 if the Richter highway closes and the route has seen renewed importance with the washouts and the Osoyoos wildfire leading to increased essential travel along what was long considered an obsolete legacy route used mostly by local traffic.

Extra driving time should be allowed for traffic congestion (tourism) in the Okanagan in summer. There is also some agricultural traffic in both valleys. There is limited 3 and 4 laning.

=== Major intersections ===
The entire route is in Okanagan-Similkameen Regional District.

Location	km	mi	Destinations	Notes
Keremeos	0.00	0.00	Highway 3 (Crowsnest Highway) – Osoyoos, Princeton, Vancouver	Highway 3A western terminus
Kaleden	31.65	19.67	Highway 97 north – Penticton	Highway 3A eastern terminus; former Highway 97 concurrency
Osoyoos	78.82	48.98	Highway 3 (Crowsnest Highway) – Grand Forks, Castlegar, Hope, Vancouver Highway 97 south – U.S. Border (Osoyoos)	Former Highway 3A eastern terminus; to US 97
1.000 mi = 1.609 km; 1.000 km = 0.621 mi: Closed/former

== Richter Pass Highway ==
Highway 3A
- Location: Keremeos, Osoyoos
- Length: 46.0 km (28.6 mi)
- Existed: 1965–c.1967

For a time between 1965 and about 1967, the section of what is now Highway 3 was designated as Highway 3A

The highway through Richter Pass itself opened on July 7, 1965

== See also ==
- Crowsnest Highway
- Glass House (British Columbia) — a roadside attraction on highway 3A
