= Marron Valley =

- Location of Marron Valley in British Columbia
- Coordinates: 49°22′00″N 119°40′00″W
- Country: Canada
- Province: British Columbia

Marron Valley is an inhabited locality and former post office in the South Okanagan region of the Southern Interior of British Columbia, Canada, located to the west of Skaha Lake.

Named in association with the Marron River, a post office was first opened in 1909 as Marron Lake. The post office was re-designated Marron Valley in 1924. The Geological Survey of Canada map for 1936 show "Marron Valley (town)" though this was downgraded to "Marron Valley (settlement)" in 1954.
