= Ministry of Transportation and Transit =

Government ministry in British Columbia, Canada

The Ministry of Transportation and Transit is the British Columbia government ministry responsible for transport and law in the Canadian province of British Columbia. It is currently led by Mike Farnworth.

The ministry is responsible for the planning of transportation networks, providing transportation services and infrastructure, developing and implementing transportation policies, and administering many transportation-related acts and regulations. Its responsibilities include ports, airports, public transit, ferry services, roads and cycling networks. The ministry is also responsible for the following Crown Corporations: BC Transportation Financing Authority, BC Railway Company, BC Transit, the Transportation Investment Corporation and the BC Pavilion Corporation.

== Mandate ==
The purpose of the Ministry of Transportation and Transit is to:

- Create an integrated and safe transportation network that incorporates all modes of transport, including rail transit, reflects regional priorities, and provides a strong foundation for economic growth; and;
- Maintain and improve the provincial highway system, ensuring the safe and efficient movement of people and goods provincially, nationally and internationally

== History ==
The history of the ministry can be traced back to 1854 when three road commissioners were appointed to oversee the expenditure of the first appropriation of £500.

- In 1858, the Department of Lands and Works was created under the Chief Commissioner of Lands and Works.
- In 1871, a Constitutional Act set up the Land and Works Department to locate, construct, and maintain highways and bridges.
- On May 7 1908, a separate Department of Public Works was formed and placed under a Minister of Public Works.
- On March 15, 1955, highways became the responsibility of the new Department of Highways and on June 30, 1976, the Department of Highways and Public Works.
- On September 27, 1977, the Ministerial Titles Amendment Act was passed and the department became a ministry.
- On December 5, 1978, Transportation and Communication were added to the portfolio and the title became the Ministry of Transportation, Communications, and Highways.
- On November 23, 1979, the Ministry of Transportation and Highways was established.
- On June 5, 2001, the name of the ministry changed to Ministry of Transportation.
- On June 23, 2008, the name of the ministry changed to Ministry of Transportation and Infrastructure.
- On November 18, 2024, the name of the ministry changed to Ministry of Transportation and Transit. The Infrastructure portfolio was moved under a newly established standalone ministry.

== Organization ==
The ministry is organized into five different departments:

- Finance and Management Services Department
  - The Finance and Management Services Department supports the ministry's financial and administrative activities.
- Highways Department
  - The Highways Department is the delivery arm of the ministry, responsible for planning, building operating and maintaining the ministry's transportation infrastructure, including providing information on DriveBC. The department is also home to the Commercial Vehicle Safety Enforcement Branch.
    - To deliver its mandate, the Highways Department has several offices in communities throughout the province. The offices are organized by region and then by district:
      - South Coast Region
        - Lower Mainland District
        - Vancouver Island District
      - Southern Interior Region
        - Rocky Mountain District
        - West Kootenay District
        - Okanagan-Shuswap District
        - Thompson Nicola District
        - Cariboo District
      - Northern Region
        - Peace District
        - Fort George District
        - Bulkley-Stikine District
        - Skeena District
- Infrastructure Department
  - The Infrastructure Department is responsible for the ministry's transportation investment plan and oversees infrastructure grant programs. It also oversees the ministry's involvement in the Evergreen Line and the marine branch, which looks after the ministry's responsibilities related to coastal and inland ferries.
- Partnerships Department
  - The Partnerships Department is responsible for property procurement and management, project governance and corporate initiatives, operations and procurement and the Transit Branch, which looks after the Provincial Transit Plan.
- Transportation Policy & Programs Department
  - The focus of the Transportation Policy & Programs Department is the province's surface, air and marine policy, Pacific Gateway Strategy, as well as the Passenger Transportation Branch, which supervises commercial passenger vehicles.

== Ministry inventory ==
The ministry looks after a large number of transportation-related assets, including:

- Border Crossings 53
  - Alberta 24
  - Alaska 1
  - Idaho 2
  - Montana 1
  - Northwest Territories 1
  - Washington 17
  - Yukon Territory 7
- Changeable Message Signs 52
- Culverts** 183,962
- Gravel Reserve 2,744
- Guardrail*** 16,375
- Large Culverts (>3 m (9 ft 10 in) diameter) 652
- Large Other Tunnels* (Generally >3 m (9 ft 10 in) Width) 83
- Large Retaining Walls (2 m (6 ft 7 in) height) 1,090
- Other Tunnels* 300
- Railway Level Crossings 651
- Rest Areas 174
- Retaining Walls** 556
- Road Tunnels (>3 m (9 ft 10 in) width) 69
- Sign Structures 217
- Signs** 247,493
- Snowsheds 4
- Total Road Kilometres 47,647 (Miles 29,606)
- Traffic Signals 694

Of Note: *Includes: pedestrian/cattle/animal tunnels** Inventory currently being updated*** Count of Guardrail locations

== Ferries ==
The Ministry of Transportation and Transit is responsible for the provision of inland ferry services on the province's rivers and lakes, although it generally contracts the operation of these services to private sector companies. The ferries provided by the ministry include:

- Adams Lake Cable Ferry, across Adams Lake
- Arrow Park Ferry, across the Arrow Lakes at Arrow Park
- Barnston Island Ferry, across an arm of the Fraser River between Barnston Island and Port Kells
- Big Bar Ferry, across the Fraser River at Big Bar
- Francois Lake Ferry, across Francois Lake from Francois Lake to Southbank
- GladeFerry, across the Kootenay River
- Harrop Cable Ferry, across the Kootenay River
- Kootenay Lake Ferry, across Kootenay Lake between Balfour and Kootenay Bay
- Little Fort Ferry, across the North Thompson River
- Lytton Ferry, across the Fraser River at Lytton
- McLure Ferry, across the North Thompson River
- Needles Cable Ferry, across the Arrow Lakes at Needles
- Upper Arrow Lake Ferry, across the Arrow Lakes between Shelter Bay and Galena Bay.
- Usk Ferry, across the Skeena River at Usk

Coastal ferry services are not the direct responsibility of the Ministry of Transportation and Transit. Instead they are provided by BC Ferries.
