= Kootenay Lake ferry =

Ferry in British Columbia, Canada

Coordinates: 49°39′07″N 116°54′41″W

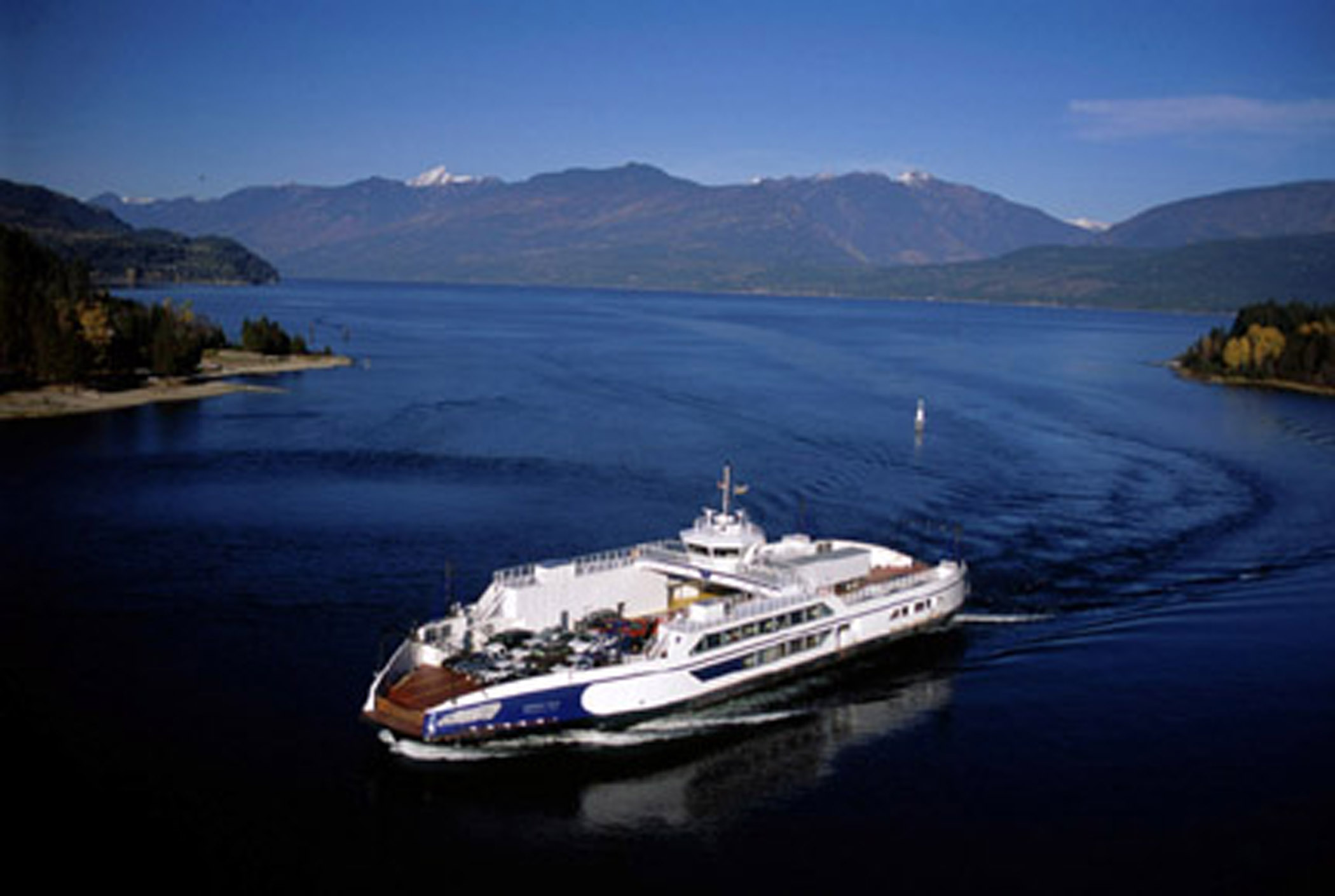
- The Osprey 2000 on Kootenay Lake
- Locale: Balfour−Kootenay Bay
- Waterway: Kootenay Lake
- Transit type: Passenger and automobile ferry
- Carries: Highway 3A
- Operator: Western Pacific Marine
- System length: 8 km (5 mi)
- No. of lines: 1
- No. of vessels: 2
- No. of terminals: 2
- Website: www2.gov.bc.ca/gov/content/transportation/passenger-travel/water-travel/inland-ferries/kootenay-lake-ferry

The Kootenay Lake ferry is a ferry across Kootenay Lake in southeastern British Columbia, which operates between Balfour, on the west side of the lake, and Kootenay Bay, on the east side. The MV Osprey 2000 and the MV Balfour are the two vessels used.

The route is the world's longest free scenic ferry which carries vehicles. The elimination of fares on the Tancook Island ferry in June 2021, made it the longest free passenger ferry route.

== Sternwheeler era ==
A number of companies operated ferries on the lake from the 1890s. When the Canadian Pacific Railway completed a rail link between Procter and Kootenay Landing in 1930, sternwheeler service on the southern arm of the lake ended. In 1931, the BC government chartered the SS Nasookin for the Main Lake crossing between Fraser's Landing and Gray Creek. The government acquired the vessel in 1933, modifying the upper decks for the route.

== Balfour–Kootenay Bay ==
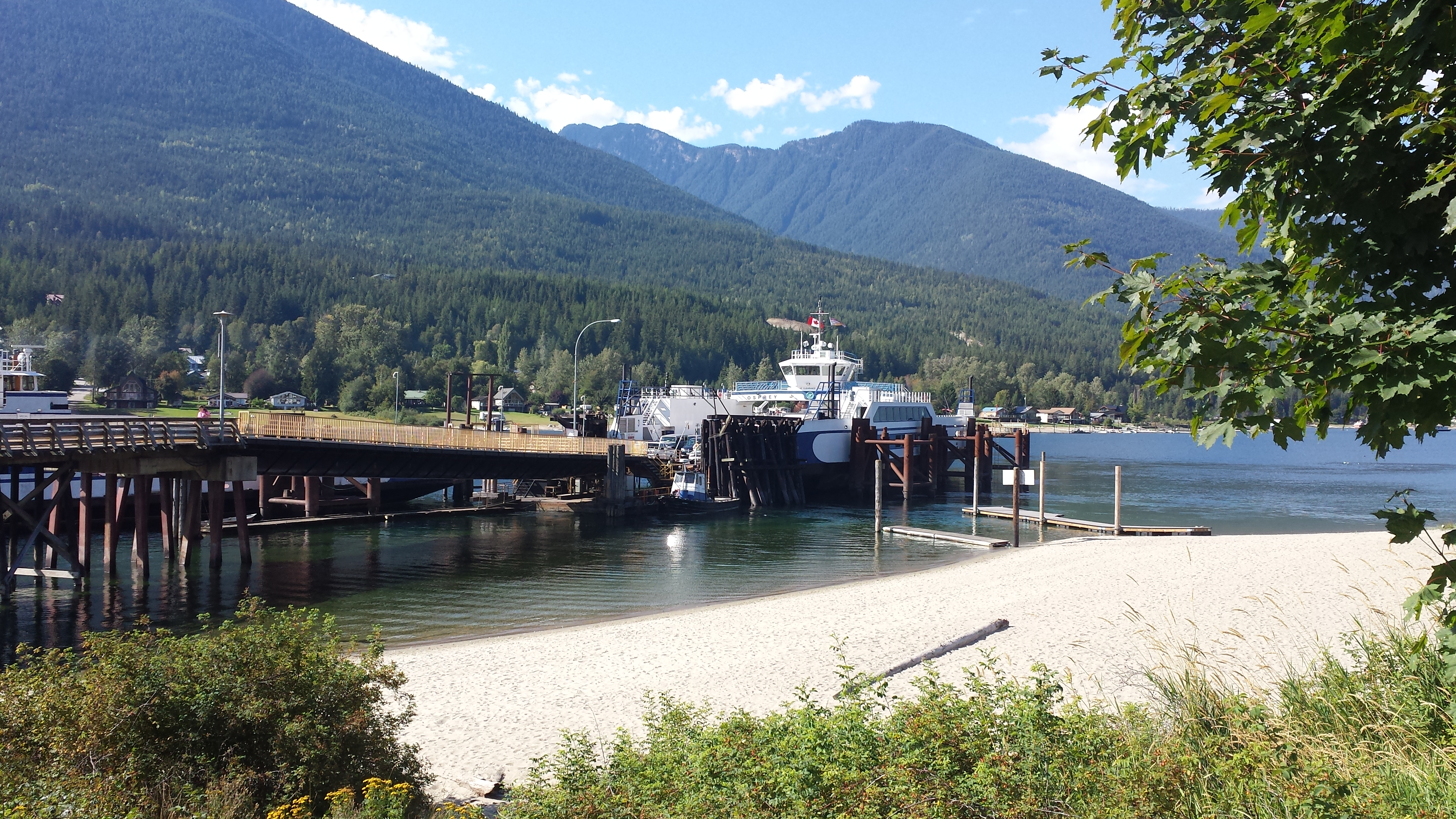
Kootenay Lake Balfour terminal

In 1947, the terminals were relocated to Balfour and Kootenay Bay. Launched in 1946, the 40-vehicle, 150-passenger capacity MV Anscomb served the route until 2000. In 1960, the superstructure was raised to increase truck clearance. In 1972, the vessel was stripped to the car deck and completely rebuilt. In 2004, the decommissioned vessel sank while moored for renovations.

The 28-vehicle, 150-passenger capacity MV Balfour was launched in 1954. After the October 1963 opening of the Salmo–Creston highway over the Kootenay Pass, ferry fares were eliminated the following month. Built by Kootenay Ferry Builders at Nelson, the 80-vehicle, 250-passenger capacity MV Osprey 2000 was launched and entered service in 2000. Since 2004, Western Pacific Marine has been the service contractor.

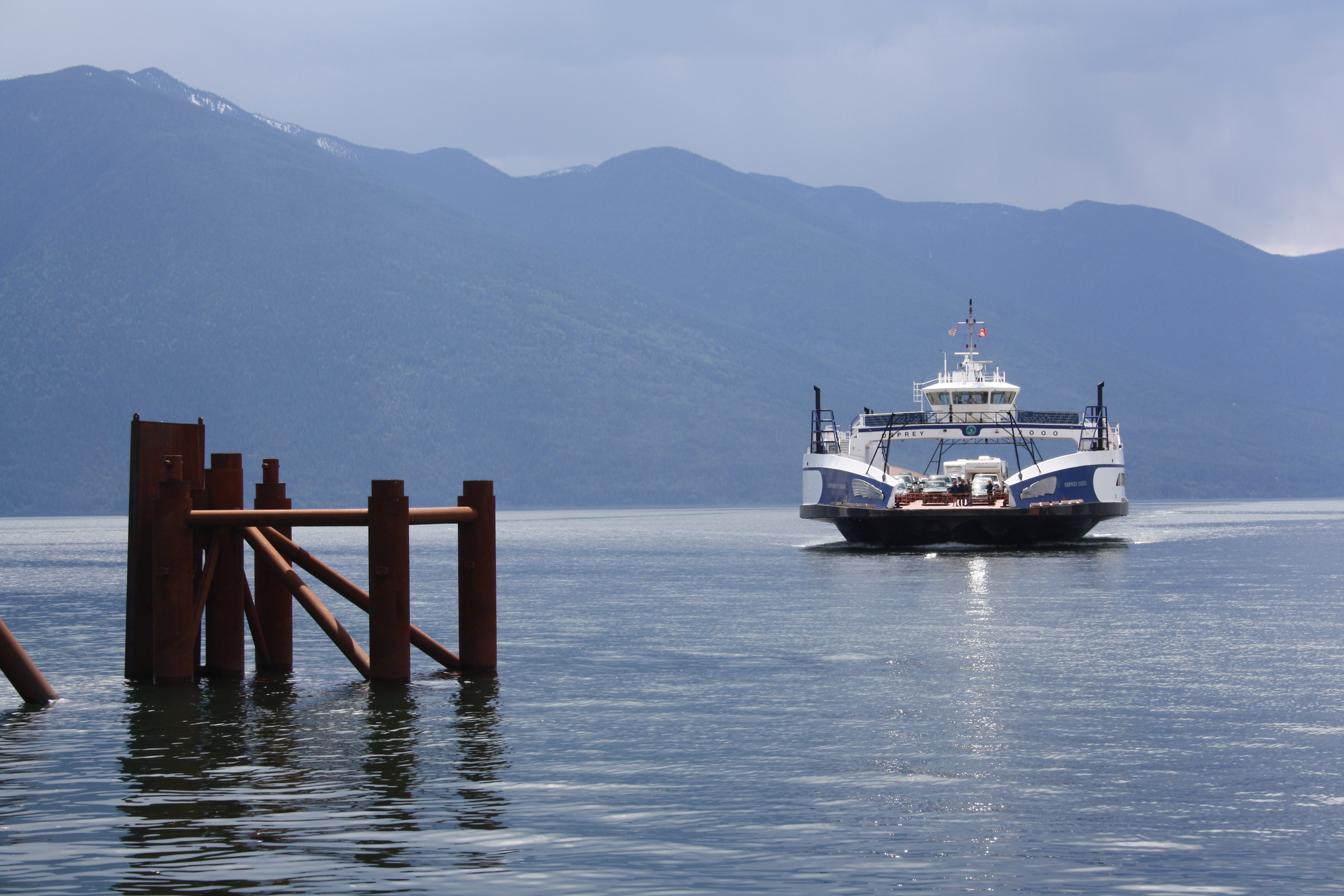
Osprey 2000

The free ferry operates under contract to the British Columbia Ministry of Transportation and Infrastructure. A single vessel sails throughout the year, with ten departures from Balfour between 6:30am and 9:40pm, returning from Kootenay Bay between 7:10am and 10:20pm. The second vessel runs in summer only, providing an extra five crossings in either direction. The crossing is about 8 km (5 mi) in length and takes 35 minutes. The Osprey 2000 normally handles the main service, while the smaller Balfour usually provides the additional summer sailings.

In 2021, a realignment of Upper Balfour Road to eliminate a steep slope was completed, and a new washroom building was erected at the Balfour Terminal. Also announced in 2021 was a replacement vessel for the aging MV Balfour. The new vessel, initially scheduled to enter service in 2023, will have a vehicle capacity of 55 which will more than double the Balfour's capacity and it is planned to have it fully converted to electric propulsion by 2030. The name for the new vessel will be MV Kokanee and as of spring 2026 its entry into service was further delayed to 2027.

== See also ==
- Adams Lake Cable ferry
- Arrow Park ferry
- Barnston Island Ferry
- Big Bar Ferry
- Francois Lake ferry
- Glade Cable ferry
- Harrop Cable Ferry
- Lytton Ferry
- Little Fort Ferry
- McLure Ferry
- Needles Ferry
- Upper Arrow Lake Ferry
- Usk Ferry
