= Kootenay Bay =

- Settlement
- Location of Kootenay Bay in British Columbia
- Coordinates: 49°40′59″N 116°52′03″W
- Country: Canada
- Province: British Columbia
- Region: West Kootenay
- Regional district: Central Kootenay
- Elevation: 556 m (1,824 ft)
- Time zone: UTC-07:00 (MST)
- Postal code: V0B 1X0
- Area codes: 250, 778, 236, & 672
- Highways: Highway 3A

Kootenay Bay is an unincorporated community on the east shore of Kootenay Lake in the West Kootenay region of southeastern British Columbia. The ferry terminal and former steamboat landing, on BC Highway 3A, is by road about 81 kilometres (50 mi) north of Creston and 4.5 kilometres (2.8 mi) west of Crawford Bay.

== Name origin ==
Formerly called Lynchville, John Lynch built a house on the lakeshore in the early 1900s. When fire destroyed the property, Lynch left, and the bay and shore location became Kootenay Bay. However, the name change did not become official until 1908. An 1897 reference to the Pilot Bay Smelting company's plant at Kootenay Bay appears a misprint. During this era, the landing was a flag stop for sternwheelers.

== Early community ==
A good Crawford Bay–Kootenay Bay trail was constructed in 1908, improving the steep trail over the ridge separating the two places. The ridge trail upgraded to a wagon road in 1912. Arriving that year, the Fraser family became significant landowners, starting the first commercial and agricultural development in the 1920s. The population of about 25 permanent residents at the time were largely ranchers and fruit growers.

In 1947, the eastern terminal for the British Columbia Ministry of Transportation and Infrastructure Kootenay Lake Ferry relocated from Gray Creek. The next year, the K'niksu Lodge was built, but this two-storey log building burned to the ground in 1962.

== Later community ==
With a population of about 100, the location is a base for hiking trails to nearby Pilot Bay Lighthouse (1907) and Pilot Bay Provincial Park. A small motel/cabin/restaurant complex caters to visitors.
