= Kootenay Lake =

Lake in British Columbia, Canada

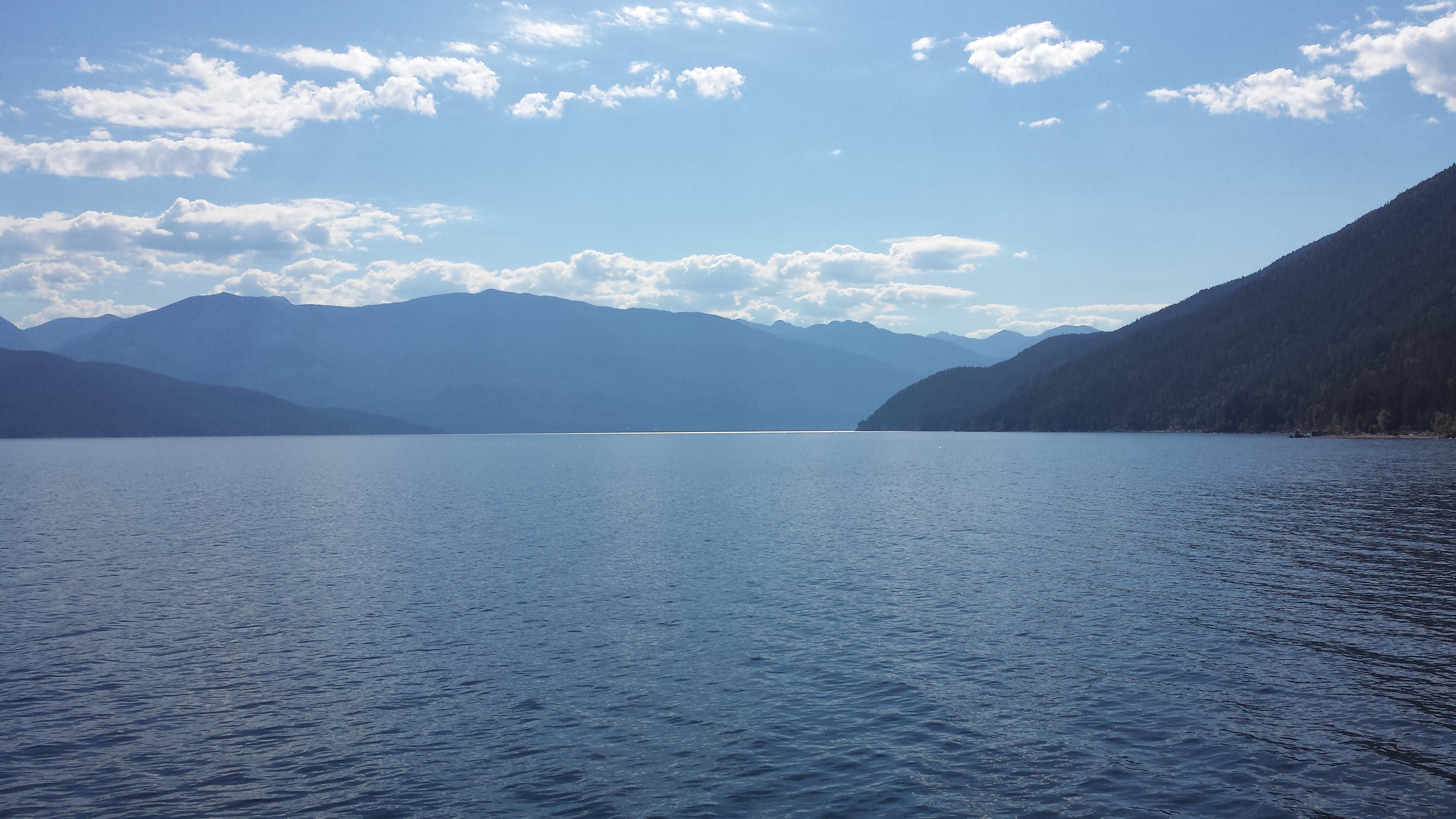
- Kootenay Lake with Old Tom Mountain in the background

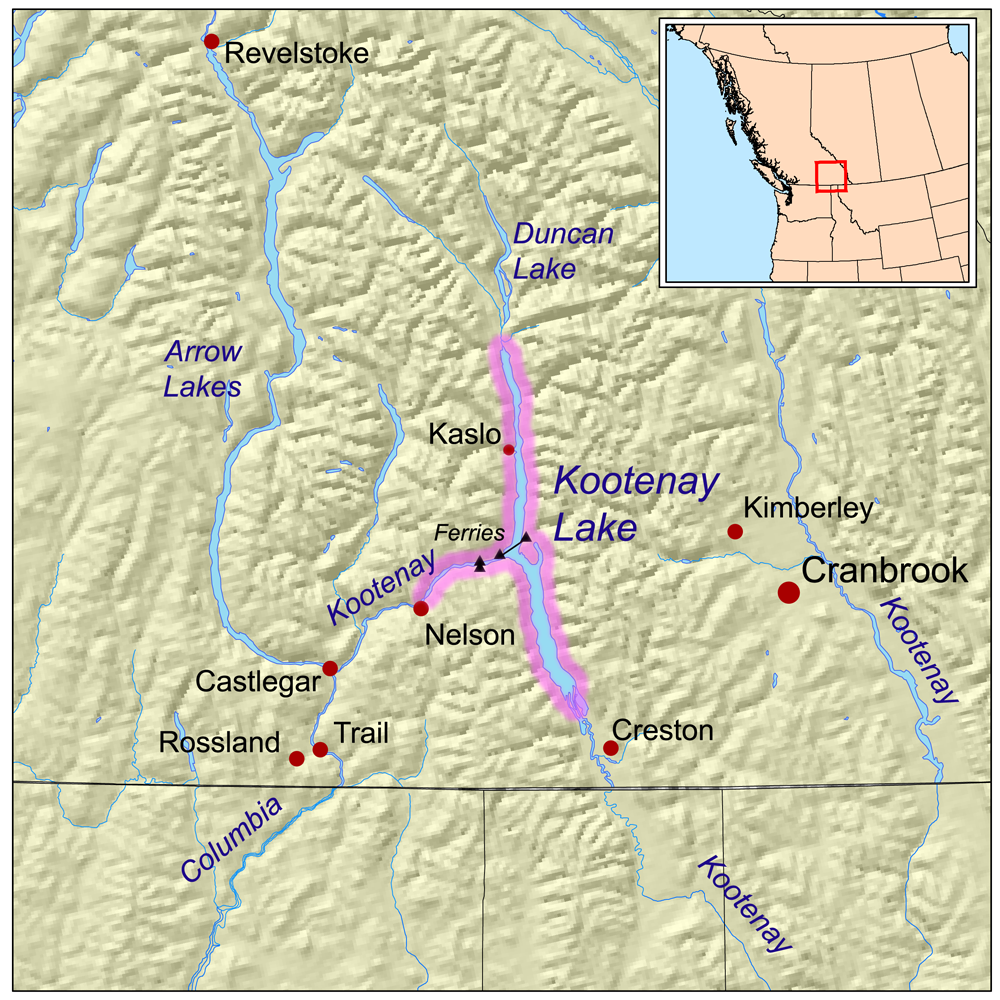
- Map of Kootenay Lake, British Columbia

- Location within British Columbia
- Location: Kootenay region, British Columbia
- Coordinates: 49°38′N 116°55′W
- Primary inflows: Kootenay River
- Primary outflows: Kootenay River
- Basin countries: Canada
- Max. length: 104 km (65 mi)
- Max. width: 5 km (3.1 mi)
- Surface area: 407 km^{2} (157 sq mi)
- Average depth: west arm 10 m (33 ft), main lake 45 m (148 ft)
- Max. depth: 150 m (490 ft)
- Residence time: avg. 1.5 years
- Surface elevation: 532 m (1,745 ft)
- Settlements: Nelson, British Columbia

Kootenay Lake is a lake located in British Columbia, Canada. It is part of the Kootenay River. The lake has been raised by the Corra Linn Dam and has a dike system at the southern end, which, along with industry in the 1950s–70s, has changed the ecosystem in and around the water. The Kootenay Lake ferry is a year-round toll-free ferry that crosses between Kootenay Bay and Balfour. The lake is a popular summer tourist destination.

== Geography ==
Kootenay Lake is a long, narrow and deep fjord-like lake located between the Selkirk and Purcell mountain ranges in the Kootenay region of British Columbia. It is one of the largest lakes in British Columbia, at 104 km in length and 3–5 km in width. It is, in part, a widening of the Kootenay River, which in turn drains into the Columbia River system at Castlegar, British Columbia.

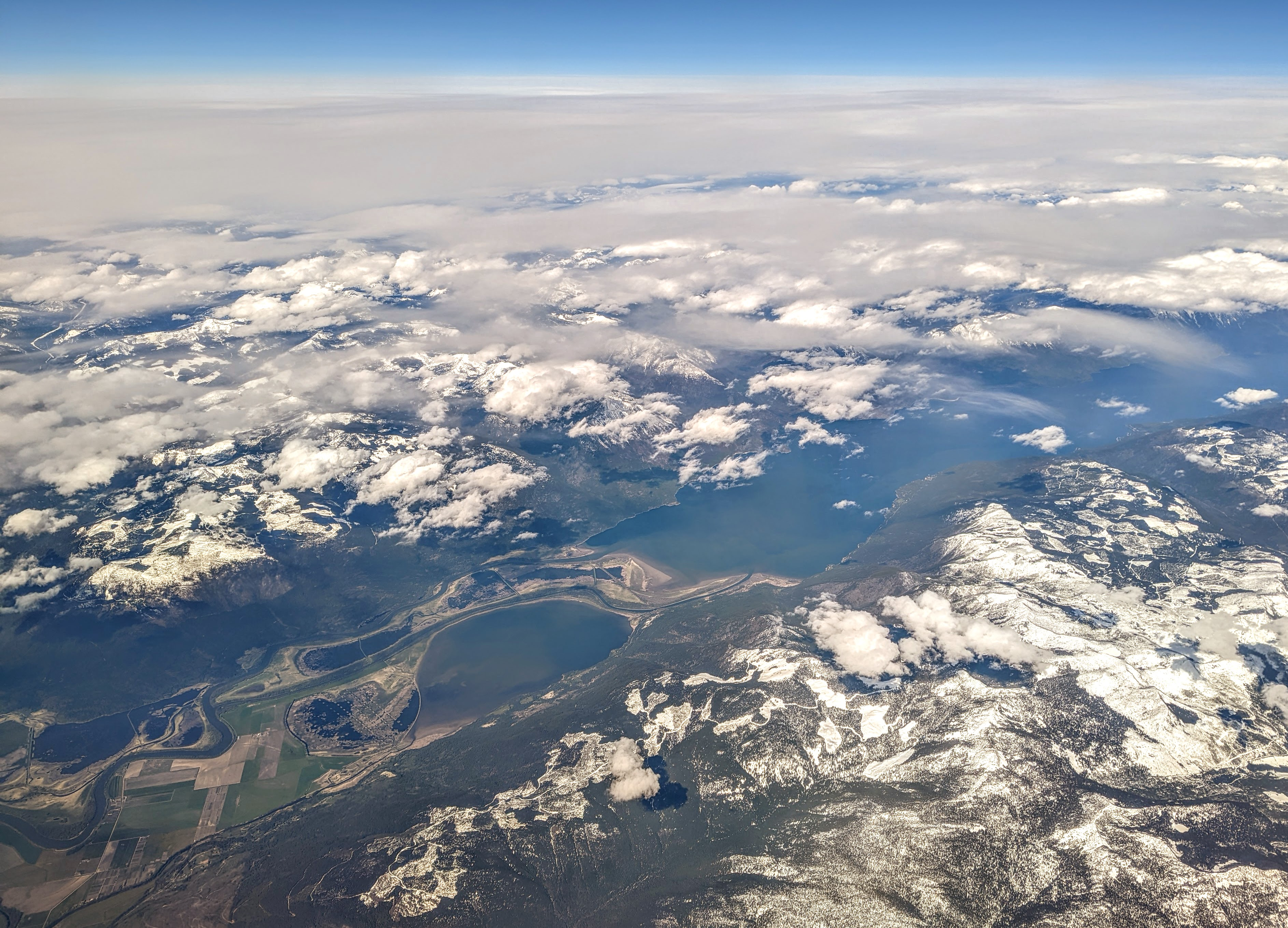
Aerial view of the south end of Kootenay Lake, with Duck Lake

Although oriented primarily in a north-south configuration, a western arm positioned roughly halfway up the length of the lake stretches 35 km to the City of Nelson. The lake is 532m above sea level, with the adjacent mountains rising up to a maximum of approximately 2700m. The average residence for water in the lake is 1.5 years, although the west arm has a much faster rate of water replacement; about 3–4 days.

Kootenay Lake was formed through river erosion and, later, glaciation. The erosion began during the late Cretaceous until ice filled the resulting valley in the Pleistocene. When the valley was filled with ice, glaciers from the mountains (the Selkirks and Purcells) fed the valley's ice mass. The glacier that occupied what is now the west arm of Kootenay Lake flowed into the Kootenay ice mass. As the ice melted from this glacier, drainage flowed over an area near what is now Nelson, causing the west arm of the lake to drain toward the west. A large moraine formed near what is now the large bend in the Kootenay River near Libby, Montana. As ice melted, a lake formed behind the moraine and drained southward over top of it. The southerly drainage over the moraine eventually stopped and the Kootenay River began to follow its present course.

Kootenay Lake is impounded by the Corra Linn Dam, some 30-35 miles downriver. Outflow rates there are 104 m^{3}/s (3,700 cu ft/s) (minimum discharge), 782 m^{3}/s (27,600 cu ft/s) (average discharge); 4,930 m^{3}/s (174,000 cu ft/s) (maximum discharge).

== History ==
Kootenay Lake is part of the traditional territory of the Sinixt and Ktunaxa peoples. These native populations used the lake and associated river systems as part of their seasonal migration and trading routes.

In 1958 the Kootenay Lake Crossing, an electrical power line, was built, running across the north arm of Kootenay Lake. It was destroyed in 1962 by protestors and rebuilt later that year.

The lake originally seasonally flooded an approximately 80 km long marsh lying to the lake's south within the Creston Valley. However, this has now been diked and converted to commercial agriculture. A smaller wetland area has been protected in this area.

In 1931, Corra Linn Dam was built at the outflow from Kootenay Lake, where it once again became a river. The dam provides flood control and winter power generation by raising the normal water level by two meters. Just down river is Bonnington Falls, today the site of several hydroelectric dams. In 2003 the lake discharged 16.9 billion cubic metres of water. High water for that year was a normal 533 metres, the record is 537 metres in 1961. In 1967 as part of the Columbia River Treaty the Duncan Dam was constructed above Kootenay Lake on the Duncan River, creating a 7,145 hectare reservoir for flow control. Also part of the treaty Libby Dam in Montana was completed in 1975.

== Fauna ==
Kootenay Lake is populated with many species of fish, such as Rainbow trout, Bull Trout, Burbot, Mountain Whitefish, White Sturgeon, Brook Trout, Largemouth Bass, Yellow Perch, Pumpkinseed sunfish and Kokanee Salmon.

There was a large decrease in the numbers of Kokanee in the west arm of the lake in the late 1970s. The salmon fishery was closed in 1980 and remains closed as of 2011. The reason for the decline is not known; possibilities include reduced numbers of Mysis relicta (which had been introduced as a food source for the Kokanee in 1949) into the west arm due to the increased control of water levels, the disruption of rearing habitat due to recurring drawdown of the lake, reduced productivity of benthos due to the reduction of the amount of nutrients into the lake (after the close of the fertilizer plant), overfishing in the 1960s to 1970s or competition between the Mysis relicta and immature fish. In 1990 the lake's southern Kokanee stocks neared extinction, and an experimental fertilizing program was started, with some success.

== Human use and impact ==
=== Settlements ===
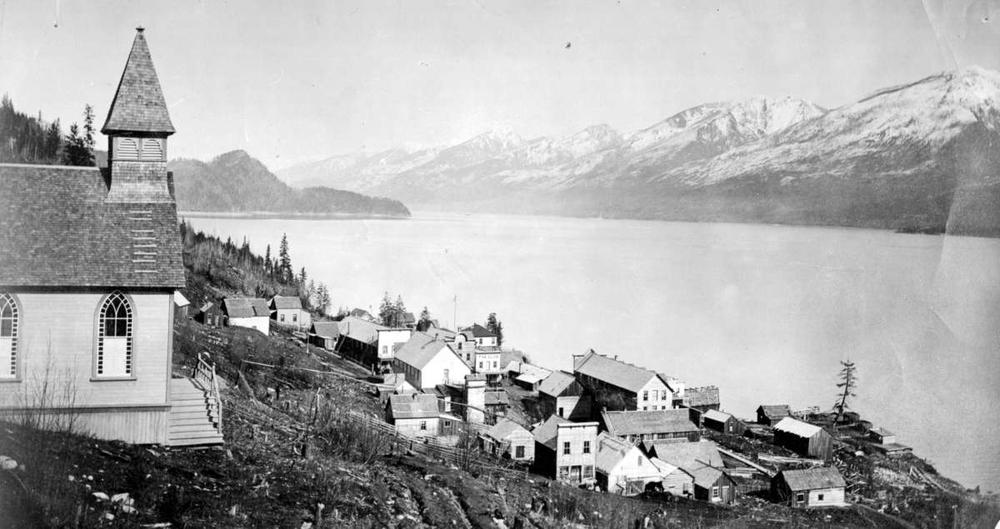
North arm of Kootenay Lake as seen from the village of Ainsworth around 1890.

Approximately 19,700 people live within 2.5 km (1.6 mi) of the Kootenay Lake shore; about 10,250 of those live in the City of Nelson. The remaining are scattered among a number of small towns and villages:

- Kuskonook, British Columbia
- Boswell, British Columbia
- Crawford Bay, British Columbia
- Ainsworth Hot Springs, British Columbia
- Kaslo, British Columbia
- Riondel, British Columbia
- Balfour, British Columbia
- Gray Creek, British Columbia
- Kootenay Bay, British Columbia
- Harrop, British Columbia
- Procter, British Columbia
- Sirdar, British Columbia

=== Upstream Influences ===
In 1953 water quality in the lake was negatively affected when the Cominco phosphate fertilizer plant on the Kootenay River at Kimberley opened. Large quantities of phosphorus entered the Kootenay River; the cause of cyanobacterial blooms from the 1950s until the early 1970s. This plant closed in 1973 eliminating these phosphates. The construction of the Libby Dam on the Kootenai River in Montana and the Duncan Dam 1967 on the Duncan River, combined to further reduce natural phosphorus levels in the lake from the recorded highs.

=== Ferry ===
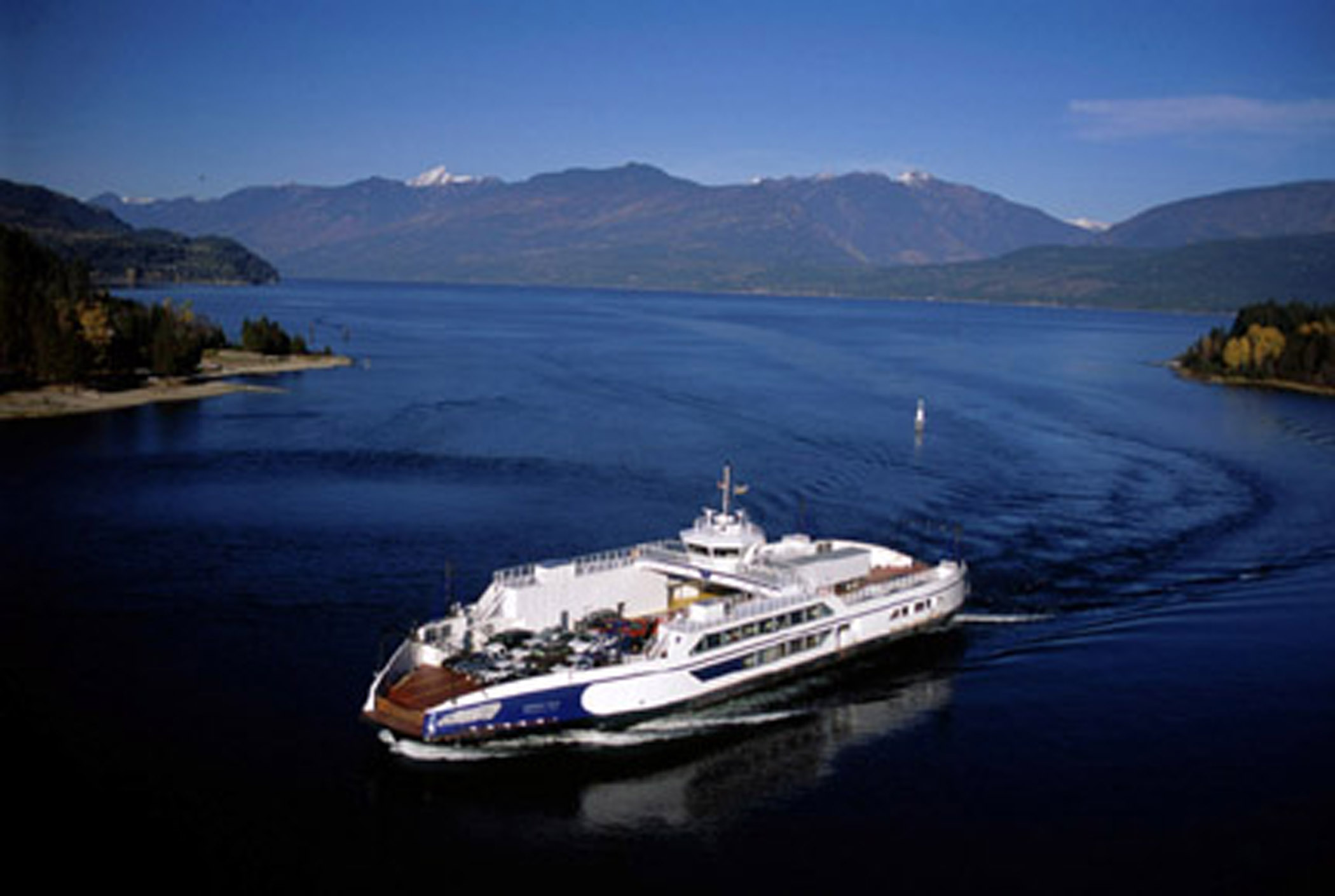
One of the ferries operating on Kootenay Lake; The Osprey.

The lake is crossed by the Kootenay Lake ferry, a toll-free vehicular ferry operating between Balfour and Kootenay Bay. The ferry operates two boats in the summer and one during the winter.

== See also ==
- List of lakes of British Columbia
- Duncan River (British Columbia)
- Glass House (British Columbia)

=== Steamboats ===
- City of Ainsworth
- Moyie
