= Preemption (land) =

19th century US right to buy public land

Preemption was a term used in the nineteenth century to refer to a settler's right to purchase public land at a federally set minimum price; it was a right of first refusal. Usually this was conferred to male heads of households who developed the property into a farm. If he was a citizen or was taking steps to become one and he and his family developed the land (buildings, fields, fences) he had the right to then buy that land for the minimum price. Land was otherwise sold through auction, typically at a price too high for these settlers. Preemption is similar to squatter's rights and mining claims.

Preemption was politically controversial, primarily among land speculators and their allies in government. In the early history of the United States, and even to some degree during the colonial era, settlers were moving into the "virgin wilderness" and building homes and farms without regard to land title. The improvements increased the value of all the nearby property. Eventually the political opposition by the speculators crumbled and the Preemption Act of 1841 was passed.

The Preemption Act of 1841 was abused by speculators who now operated as money lending businesses, or were able to coerce accomplices to falsely claim they were living on land that they wanted. A common example of the latter practice was in the logging industry in the upper Midwest, where mill workers who lived in mill towns made a preemption claim on timber land that would then be harvested by the mill owners. Another avenue of fraud was the Desert Land Act, which did not include the residence requirement, although the preempting claimant still needed to improve the land, primarily by providing a water source. In California, tens of thousands of acres of land were claimed via false preemptors – "dummy entrymen" – on behalf of several large land speculating companies.

The Preemption Act of 1841 was pivotal, but was neither the beginning nor the end of the issue of preemption. The Land Act of 1804, the Homestead Act, the aforementioned Desert Land Act, and other similar land acts addressed the issue of preemption.
