= Copes =

Copes is a surname and the plural of the word cope. Notable people called Copes include:

- Elizabeth Copes (born 1976), Argentinian judoka
- Erik Copes (born 1993), basketballplayer
- Juan Carlos Copes (1931–2021), Tango dancer and choreographer
- Parzival Copes (born 1924), Canadian economist

== See also ==
- Copes Bay, Nunavut, Canada
- Cope (disambiguation)
- Coping (disambiguation)
