= Woodward Bay =

Bay in Nunavut, Canada

- Location within Nunavut
- Location: Nares Strait
- Coordinates: 79°24′N 77°05′W
- Ocean/sea sources: Arctic Ocean
- Basin countries: Canada
- Settlements: Uninhabited

Woodward Bay is an Arctic waterway in the Qikiqtaaluk Region, Nunavut, Canada. It is located in Nares Strait, off eastern Ellesmere Island. Copes Bay is 12.2 km (7.6 mi) to the north, and Sawyer Bay is 13.4 km (8.3 mi) to the southwest.
