= Cope (disambiguation) =

A cope is a liturgical vestment.

Cope may also refer to:

== Music ==
- Cope (Freeland album), the second album by English DJ and record producer Adam Freeland
- Cope (Manchester Orchestra album), the fourth studio album from Atlanta-based indie rock band Manchester Orchestra
- "Cope", a song by 2hollis from the 2025 album Star
- "Cope", a song by Gigolo Aunts from the 1993 album Flippin' Out

== People ==
- Cope (wrestler) (born 1973), ring name of Canadian professional wrestler Adam Copeland

== Places ==
- El Copé, a corregimiento in Olá District, Coclé Province, Panama
- Cope Hill, an Antarctic hill one nautical mile west of Manfull Ridge
- Cope Mountain, a 2,496-foot-elevation summit in Alaska
- Cope, Colorado, an American unincorporated town
- Cope, Indiana, an American unincorporated community
- Cope, South Carolina, an American town
- Mount Cope, an Antarctic bluff-type mountain on the east side of Separation Range

== Other ==
- Cadena COPE, a Spanish language radio station
- Congress of the People (South African political party) (COPE), formed in 2008 by former members of the African National Congress
- Cope (film), a 2007 psychological thriller/horror independent film
- The Cope, a co-operative retail chain indigenous to The Rosses area of County Donegal in Ireland
- Cope and drag, the top and bottom parts of a two-part casting flask, used in sand casting
- Cope baronets, four baronetcies created for persons with the surname Cope
- Cope Bros & Co, a company based in Liverpool
- Cope Middle School, a school in California's Redlands Unified School District
- Cope Middle School, a school in Louisiana's Bossier Parish School Board district

== See also ==
- Cape (disambiguation)
- COPE (disambiguation)
- Cope's rule, an evolutionary principle
- Copeland (disambiguation)
- Copenhagen (tobacco), an American chewing tobacco brand
- Coping (disambiguation)
