= COPE =

COPE may refer to:

== Organizations ==
=== Organized labour bodies ===
- Canadian Office and Professional Employees Union, a Canadian labour union
- Committee on Political Education, the political arm of the AFL-CIO
- Council of Pacific Education, a regional branch of Education International, the global federation of teachers' trade unions

=== Political organizations ===
- Coalition of Progressive Electors, a municipal political party in Vancouver, British Columbia, Canada
- Committee on Public Enterprises (Sri Lanka), a parliamentary committee of Sri Lanka
- Congress of the People (South African political party), a political party formed in 2008 in South Africa

=== Other organizations ===
- Center for Organic Photonics and Electronics at Georgia Institute of Technology College of Sciences
- Coalition on Psychiatric Emergencies, an American medical collaborative focused on behavioural health and emergency medicine
- Committee on Publication Ethics, a nonprofit organization
- Cooperative Orthotic and Prosthetic Enterprise, a non-profit organization founded with the mission to help people with mobility-related disabilities in Laos

== Other uses ==
- Cadena COPE, the Spanish private national radio of the Spanish Catholic Church
- Communications Opportunity, Promotion and Enhancement Bill of 2006, a.k.a. the Barton/COPE Act (HR 5252)
- Company owned/personally enabled, IT business strategy through which an organization provides its employees with computing resources and devices, for a purely professional usage; see Bring your own device#Corporate-owned, personally enabled (COPE)
- COPE (Boy Scouts of America), a Boy Scouts of America program designed to develop a Challenging Outdoor Personal Experience
- Cope (film), a 2007 psychological thriller/horror independent film
- COPE (gene), a human gene that encodes the protein coatomer subunit epsilon

== See also ==
- Cope (disambiguation)
