= Nakusp =

Village in British Columbia, Canada

- Village
- Village of Nakusp
- Location of Nakusp in British Columbia
- Coordinates: 50°14′36″N 117°48′1″W
- Country: Canada
- Province: British Columbia
- Region: Arrow Lakes, West Kootenay
- Regional district: Central Kootenay
- Founded: 1892
- Incorporated: 1964

Government
  - Governing body: Nakusp Village Council
  - Mayor: Tom Zeleznik

Area
  - Total: 8.04 km^{2} (3.10 sq mi)
- Elevation: 457.2 m (1,500 ft)

Population (2021)
  - Total: 1,589
  - Density: 195.2/km^{2} (506/sq mi)
- Time zone: UTC−07:00 (PT)
- Postal code: V0G 1R0
- Area codes: 250, 778, 236, 672
- Highways: Highway 6 Highway 23
- Website: nakusp.com

The Village of Nakusp (/nəˈkʌsp/) is located south of the mouth of Kuskanax Creek, on the Upper Arrow Lake in the West Kootenay region of southeastern British Columbia. Lying between the Selkirk and Monashee ranges, the village is known for its nearby hot springs and picturesque mountain lakeside setting.

== Early history ==
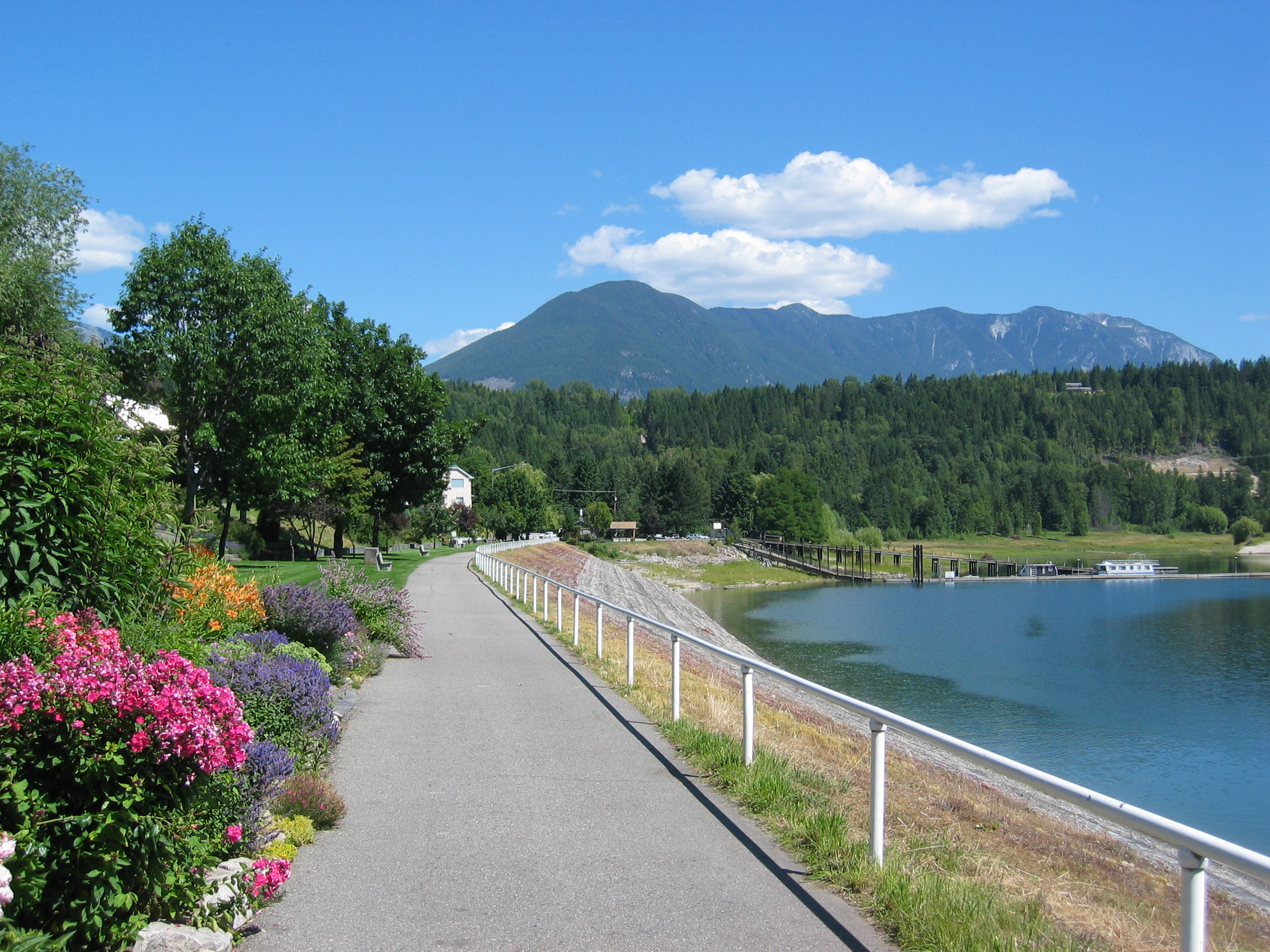
The waterfront walkway

The Secwepemc, Sinixt, and Ktunaxa peoples occupied the region for thousands of years. In 1811, Finan McDonald, a member of David Thompson's party, was the first reported European explorer on the Arrow Lakes.

The settlement name came from the Nakusp Creek to the south. As to the word meaning, suggestions have included an eddy, safe place (sheltered bay), a coming together (of the lake, which narrowed at this point prior to the dam), a private body part, and having buffalo, despite no evidence buffalo ever roamed the area.

== Demographics ==
Census population: Nakusp
Year	Pop.	±%
1966	1,282	—
1971	1,163	−9.3%
1976	1,416	+21.8%
1981	1,495	+5.6%
1986	1,410	−5.7%
1991	1,374	−2.6%
1996	1,736	+26.3%
2001	1,698	−2.2%
2006	1,524	−10.2%
2011	1,569	+3.0%
2016	1,605	+2.3%
2021	1,589	−1.0%
Source: Statistics Canada

In the 2021 Census of Population conducted by Statistics Canada, Nakusp had a population of 1,589 living in 760 of its 831 total private dwellings, a change of −1% from its 2016 population of 1,605. With a land area of 8.04 km^{2} (3.10 sq mi), it had a population density of 197.6/km^{2} (511.9/sq mi) in 2021.

=== Religion ===
According to the 2021 census, religious groups in Nakusp included:

- Irreligion (1,000 persons or 64.7%)
- Christianity (490 persons or 31.7%)
- Buddhism (10 persons or 0.6%)
- Other (30 persons or 1.9%)

== Transportation ==
In the early 1890s, most passengers and freight would travel by steamboat connecting either south with the US landings, or north with the Canadian Pacific Railway (CP) main line at Revelstoke. However, low water and ice on the Arrow Lakes made the water route unreliable for several months of the year, which favoured Revelstoke for non-mining traffic. Shallow-draft sternwheelers frequented this important hub. From 1895, the Nakusp and Slocan Railway brought ore northwestward to Nakusp from the inland mines. From 1897, the Columbia and Kootenay Railway helped divert US bound traffic from the foot of the lake to the Nakusp landing. From 1913, CP operated a Nakusp–Kaslo link, after acquiring and rehabilitating the former Kaslo and Slocan Railway. Around 1930, the opening of the Summit Lake–Rosebery link completed the Nelson–Nakusp highway. Nakusp was the mid-way point for the Nelson–Vernon stage. During the late 1940s, Celgar built a forest service road to Galena Bay. After the eastern terminal for the Upper Arrow Lake Ferry moved to Galena Bay in 1957, road traffic along the east shore of the lake superseded the former lake route. The upgrade of this road to highway status was completed in 1967.

== Community ==
In 1892, a post office, general store and sawmill opened, but building lots were not for sale in the townsite subdivision, developed by A.E. Hodgins and Frank Fletcher, until the following year. A school came in 1895 and church in 1898. Electric power arrived in 1920.

In the early 1930s, the settlement included a hospital, elementary and high schools, four churches, movie theatre, community halls, post office, bank, police station, restaurant, three grocery stores, hardware store, menswear store, drug store, candy store, novelty store, bakery, barbershop, newspaper/printing office, and two garages, to serve the population of 800, the largest on the lake.

Nakusp was incorporated as a village in 1964. The reservoir for the Keenleyside Dam submerged the former waterfront area in 1968, necessitating some reconstruction. In the 1980s and early 2000s, a lobby group wanted to add "Hot Springs" to the name, as other communities had done to boost tourism. Residents overwhelmingly rejected the idea.

The census population was 1,605 in 2016, 1,569 in 2011, and 1,524 in 2006.

== Industry ==
Mining used to be the most important industry in the area. By the early 1930s, a CP shipyard, forestry headquarters, and two sawmills operated. Surrounding lands were farmed. Forestry has formed the major economic base for the village since the 1950s.

The mining operations in Nakusp were focused primarily on the extraction of galena and gold.

== Nakusp Hot Springs Resort ==
About 14 kilometres (9 mi) northeast of the village up the Kuskanax Valley are the springs. In 1931, the access route was 5 kilometres (3 mi) by car, and the remainder by packhorse or on foot, to the concrete swimming pool and hotter pool for relaxation. Cabins and tents were available for overnight stays.

Nowadays on a former logging road, the amphitheatre-shaped resort is built of rock and red cedar. The main building houses the 12-metre (40 ft) diameter hot springs pools on the banks of the Kuskanax Creek, next to a serviced campsite. The resort, designed by Saskatchewan architect Clifford Wiens, includes four cedar chalets in a narrow A-frame design. The pool's water is piped in from the source of the springs half a mile away. Premier Dave Barrett, who opened the resort officially in 1974, allegedly called it the Taj Mahal at the end of the Burma Road.

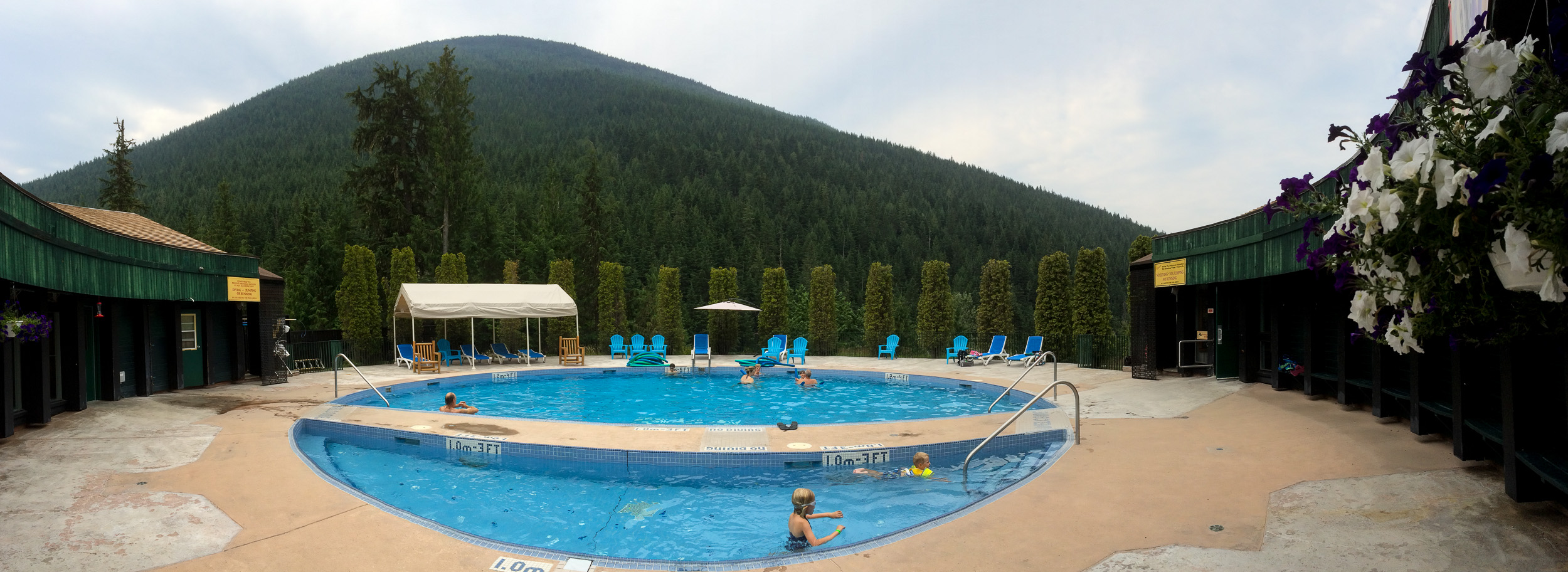
Nakusp Hot Springs

The two pools are fed daily by 200,000 litres (44,000 imp gal; 53,000 US gal) of fresh water pumped from the 57 °C (135 °F) source and filtered onsite. The smaller, Hot Pool is kept at 41 °C (106 °F) in winter and 38 °C (100 °F) in summer, and the filtered water is recycled every 30 minutes. The larger Warm Pool is maintained at 38 °C (100 °F) in the winter and 36 °C (97 °F) in the summer, on a two-hour recycling schedule.

The resort was built for $700,000 and paid for by the federal and provincial governments in the form of grants for the benefit of the municipality, which owns it. Wiens, referred to only as "the architect from Saskatchewan", was the only "outsider" involved the development. Not everyone in Nakusp was pleased with the development, and continued to hike a half mile to the site of original hot springs, until one night when the old pool was "mysteriously dynamited."

The resort made a profit for the first time in 2010. Halcyon Hot Springs, another privately owned hot springs resort, is 35 kilometres (22 mi) north of Nakusp.

== Services ==
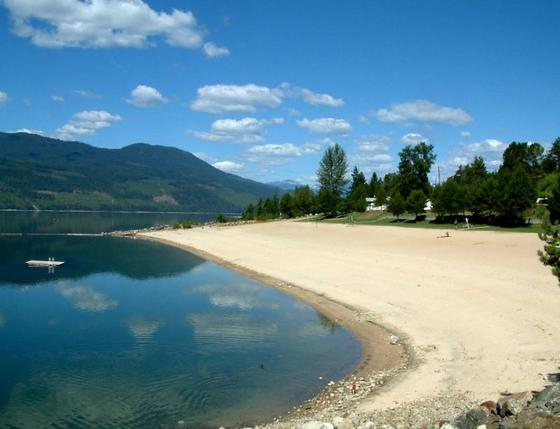
Nakusp beach

The Nakusp recreational centre comprises an ice rink, squash court, curling rink, auditorium, outdoor tennis courts, and a soccer field around a five-hectare park. Arrow Lakes Hospital serves the village and surrounding communities. There is an elementary school, a high school, and a campus of Selkirk College. The schools are part of School District 10 Arrow Lakes which has its board office in Nakusp. The area also provides many opportunities for recreation, including the Summit Lake Ski Hill, a short drive out of town towards New Denver. Nakusp Airport (TC LID: CAQ5), with an asphalt runway 909 metres (2,983 ft) in length, is northwest of the village on the hot springs road.

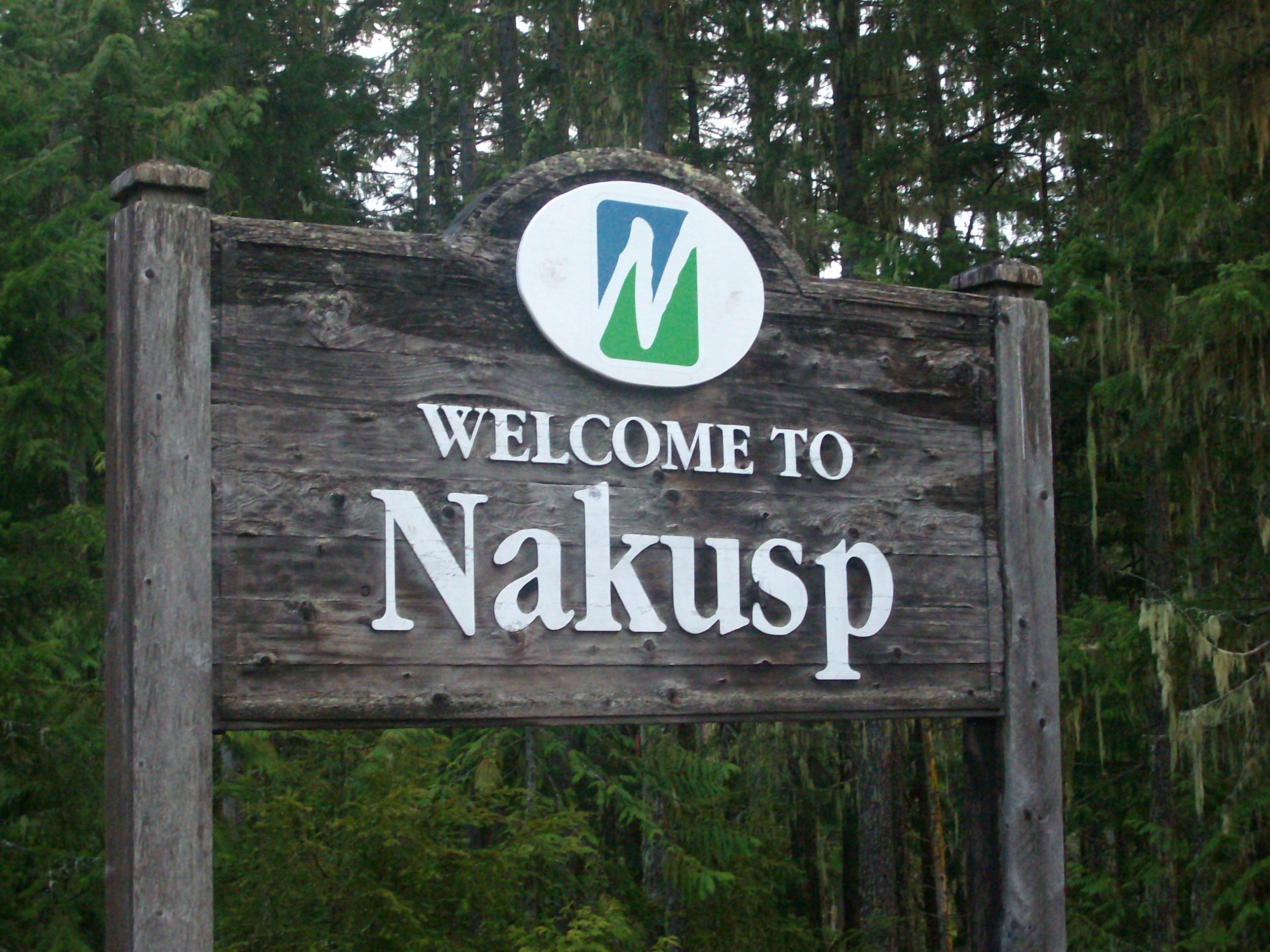
Nakusp's welcome sign

== Culture ==
Nakusp is home to a community radio station, CJHQ-FM, and a small library and museum containing numerous local historical artifacts of the indigenous and settler communities of the region.

In 2004 the village held its first Nakusp Music Fest, which proved to be a popular attraction. It was known as the Interior's largest classic rock festival, although classic rock isn't the only genre being played. The Nakusp Music Festival is no longer running, having come to an end in 2011.

== Notable people ==
- Parzival Copes (1924–2017), economist, was born in Nakusp.
- Paul Cyr (1963–2012), professional ice hockey player, was a resident 2007–2012.
- Herbert Wilfred Herridge (1895–1973), politician and WWI veteran.
- Brad Larsen (1977–), professional ice hockey player, was born in Nakusp.
- Graham Lea (1934–2013), broadcaster, politician and corporate leader, was born in Nakusp.
- George Makinson (1903–1986), politician, was born in Nakusp.
- Mitch Zorn, country singer and songwriter, was born and raised in Nakusp

== Climate ==
Nakusp has a humid continental climate (Dfb) or an inland oceanic climate (Cfb) depending on the isotherm used. The town experiences pleasantly warm summer days coupled with cool nights and moderately cold, snowy winters with annual snowfall averaging 66 inches (168 cm).

Climate data for Nakusp
Month	Jan	Feb	Mar	Apr	May	Jun	Jul	Aug	Sep	Oct	Nov	Dec	Year
Record high °C (°F)	13.3 (55.9)	13 (55)	17.5 (63.5)	24.4 (75.9)	33 (91)	41.0 (105.8)	39.4 (102.9)	37.6 (99.7)	33.3 (91.9)	23 (73)	18.3 (64.9)	14.5 (58.1)	41.0 (105.8)
Mean daily maximum °C (°F)	0.8 (33.4)	2.3 (36.1)	8 (46)	13.2 (55.8)	18.8 (65.8)	22.5 (72.5)	25.2 (77.4)	25.1 (77.2)	18.4 (65.1)	11.2 (52.2)	4.6 (40.3)	−0.1 (31.8)	12.5 (54.5)
Daily mean °C (°F)	−1.7 (28.9)	−1 (30)	3.2 (37.8)	7.5 (45.5)	12.4 (54.3)	16.2 (61.2)	18.3 (64.9)	18.1 (64.6)	12.4 (54.3)	7 (45)	1.9 (35.4)	−2.3 (27.9)	7.7 (45.9)
Mean daily minimum °C (°F)	−4.2 (24.4)	−4.2 (24.4)	−1.7 (28.9)	1.8 (35.2)	6 (43)	9.8 (49.6)	11.4 (52.5)	11.1 (52.0)	6.3 (43.3)	2.7 (36.9)	−0.8 (30.6)	−4.5 (23.9)	2.8 (37.0)
Record low °C (°F)	−24.4 (−11.9)	−24.4 (−11.9)	−18.9 (−2.0)	−9.4 (15.1)	−3.9 (25.0)	−1.1 (30.0)	1.7 (35.1)	0.6 (33.1)	−6.5 (20.3)	−11 (12)	−20 (−4)	−27.8 (−18.0)	−27.8 (−18.0)
Average precipitation mm (inches)	105.5 (4.15)	74.7 (2.94)	47.9 (1.89)	59.8 (2.35)	60.7 (2.39)	88.2 (3.47)	65 (2.6)	60.4 (2.38)	57.7 (2.27)	59.4 (2.34)	99.5 (3.92)	86.9 (3.42)	865.7 (34.08)
Average rainfall mm (inches)	40 (1.6)	49.7 (1.96)	44.1 (1.74)	59.5 (2.34)	60.7 (2.39)	88.2 (3.47)	65 (2.6)	60.4 (2.38)	57.7 (2.27)	58.8 (2.31)	78.3 (3.08)	35.5 (1.40)	698.1 (27.48)
Average snowfall cm (inches)	65.4 (25.7)	24.9 (9.8)	3.8 (1.5)	0.3 (0.1)	0 (0)	0 (0)	0 (0)	0 (0)	0 (0)	0.6 (0.2)	21.2 (8.3)	51.4 (20.2)	167.7 (66.0)

== Gallery ==
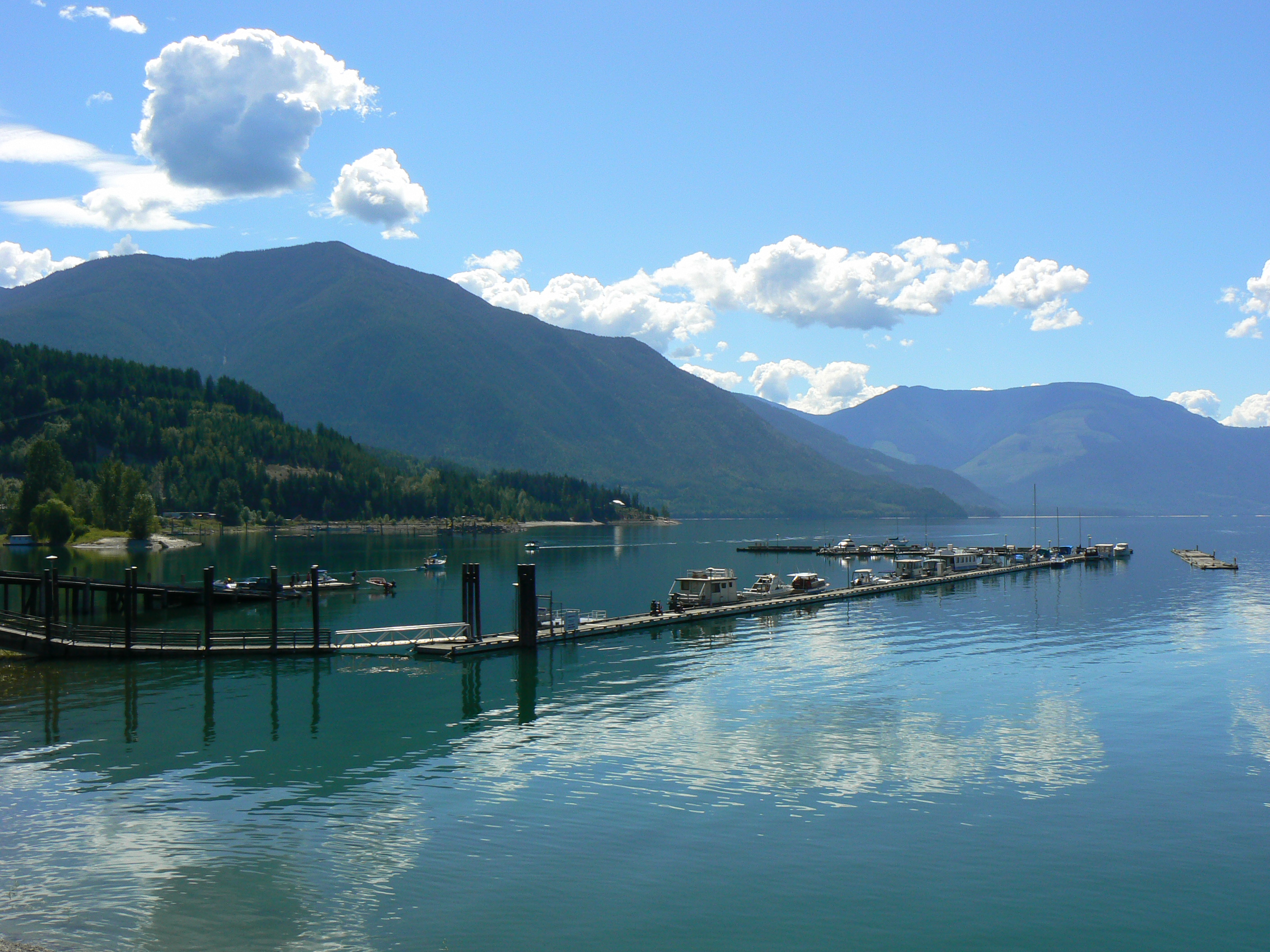
The marina in Nakusp

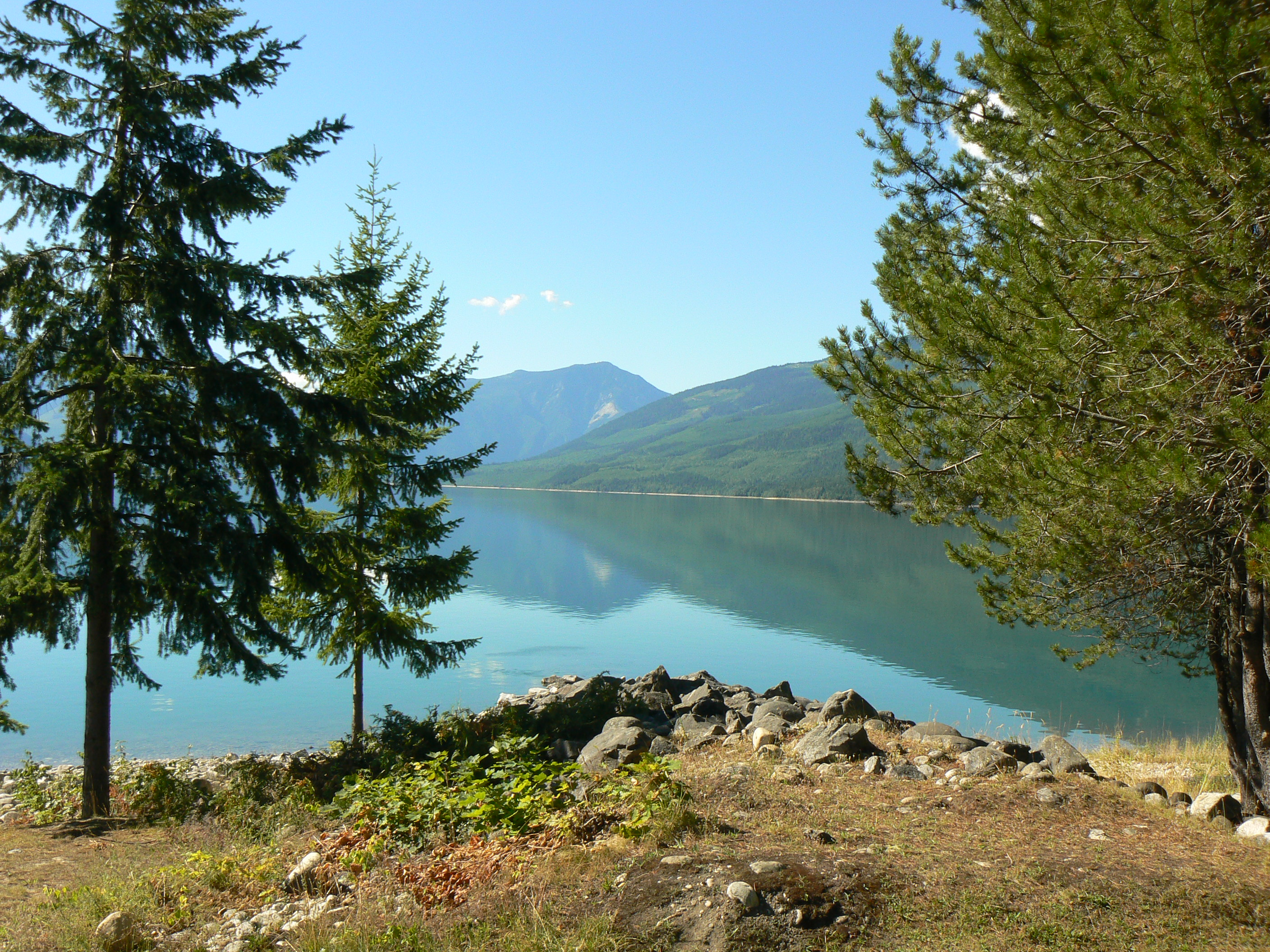
Waterfront view

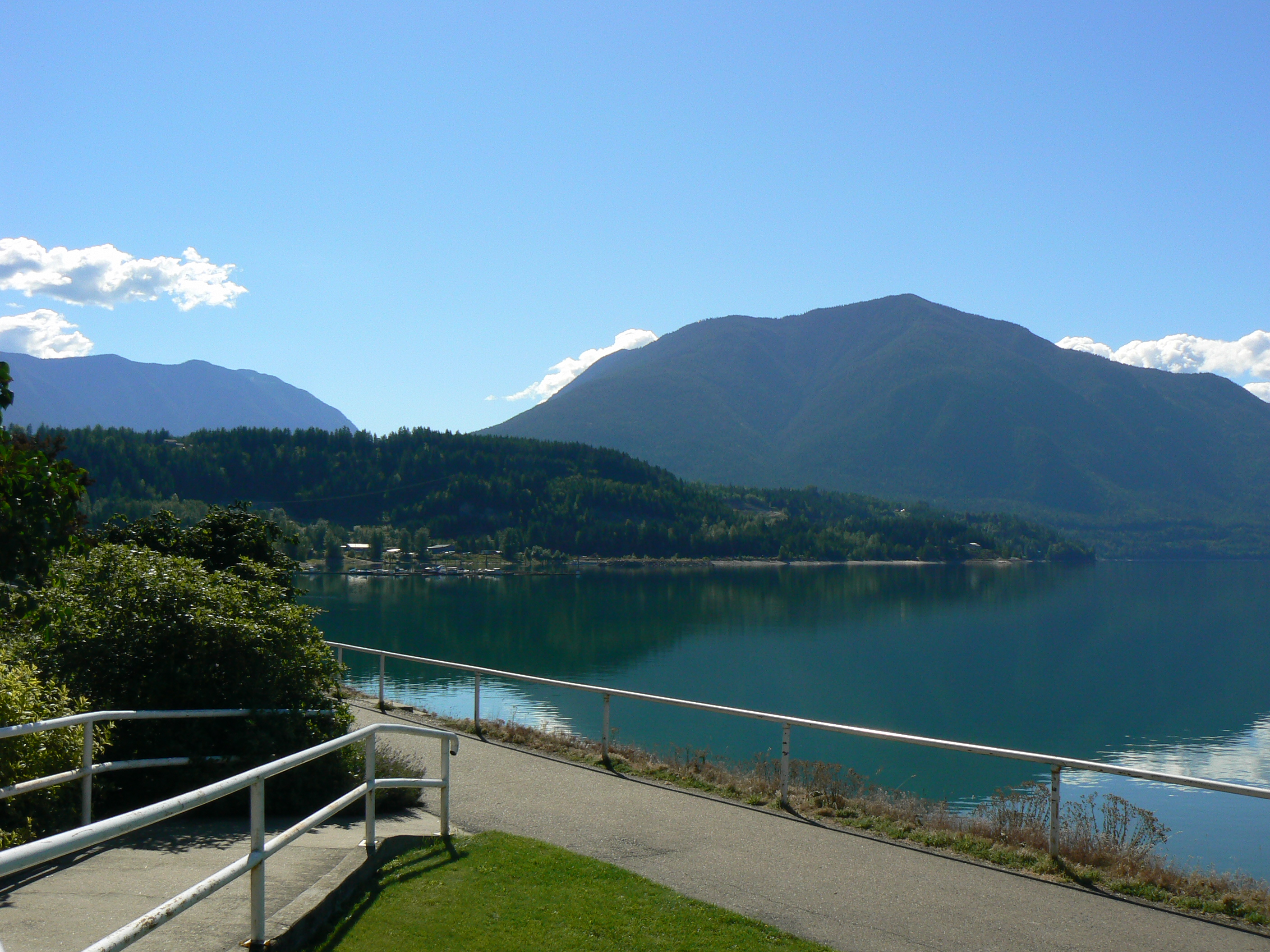
Waterfront Walk

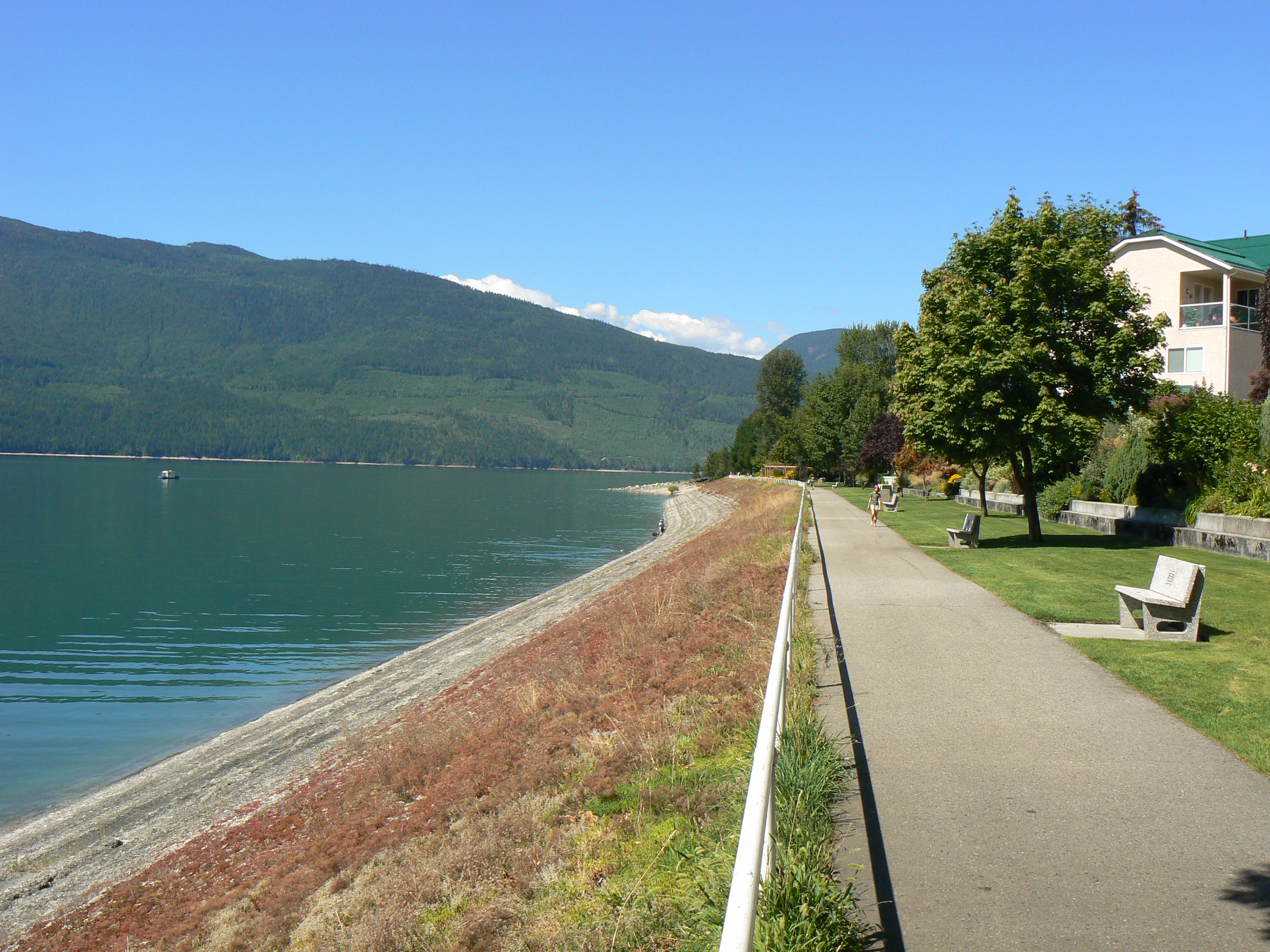
Access to the Waterfront

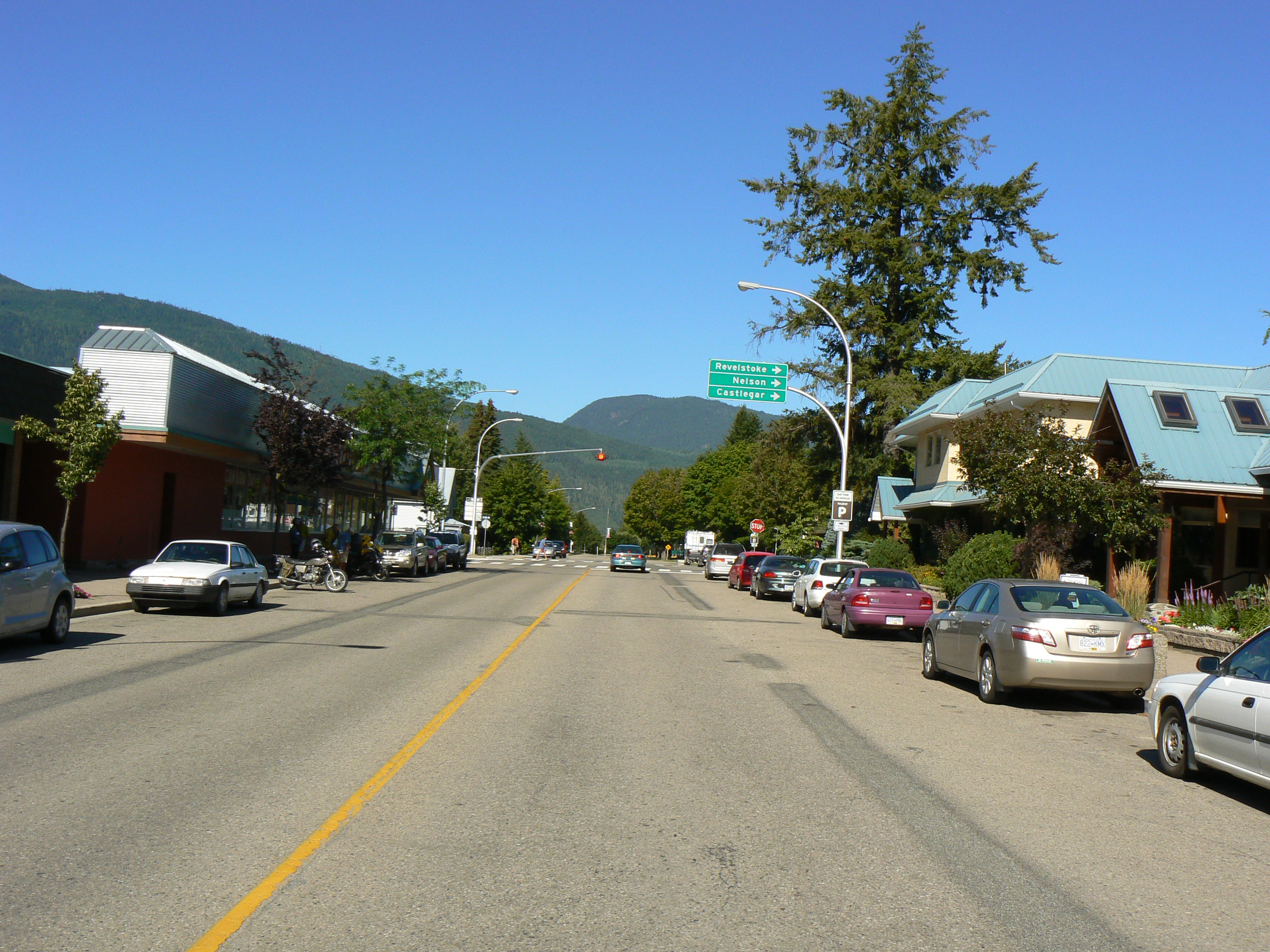
Looking west on Broadway Street

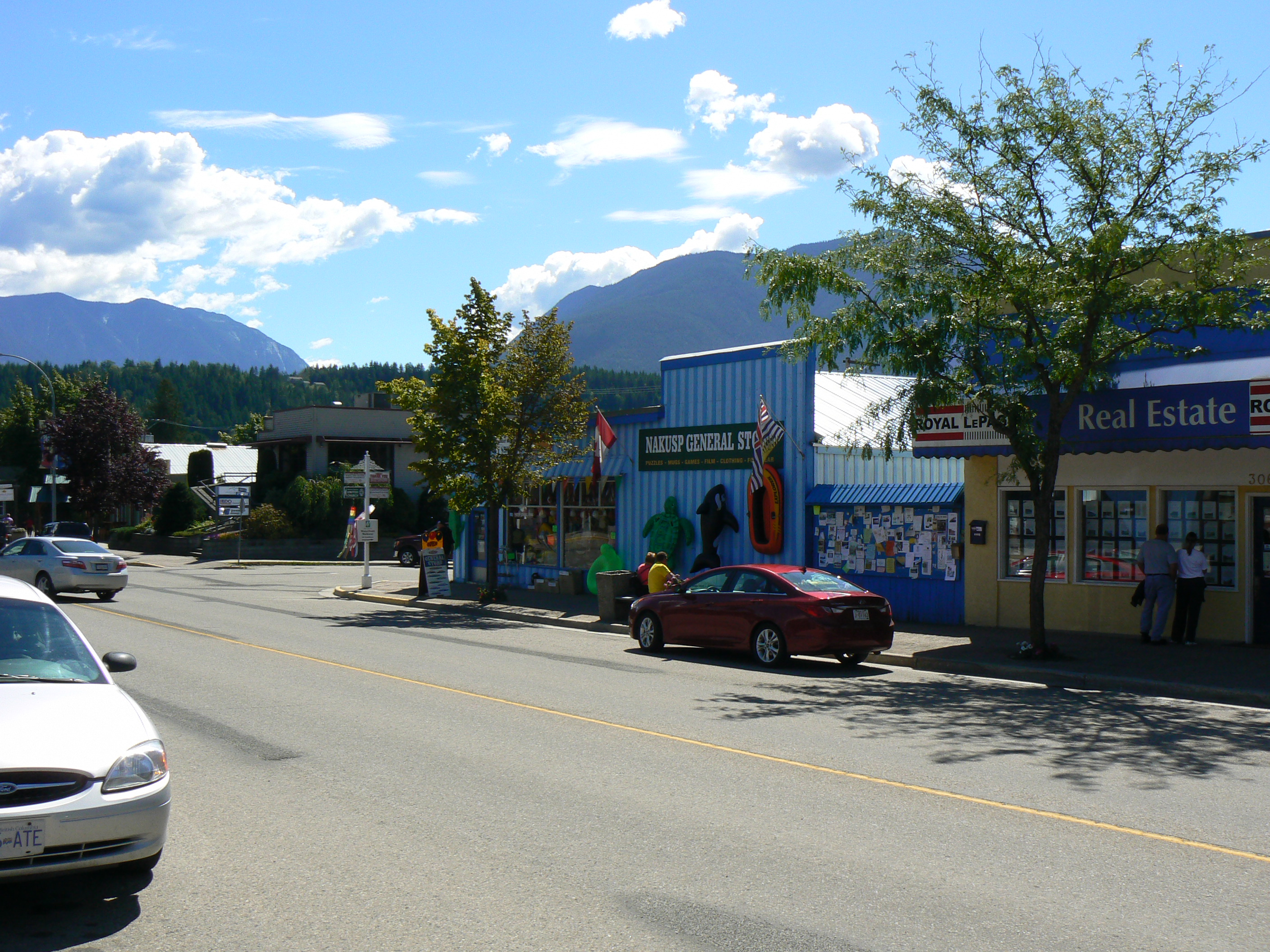
Shops on Broadway street

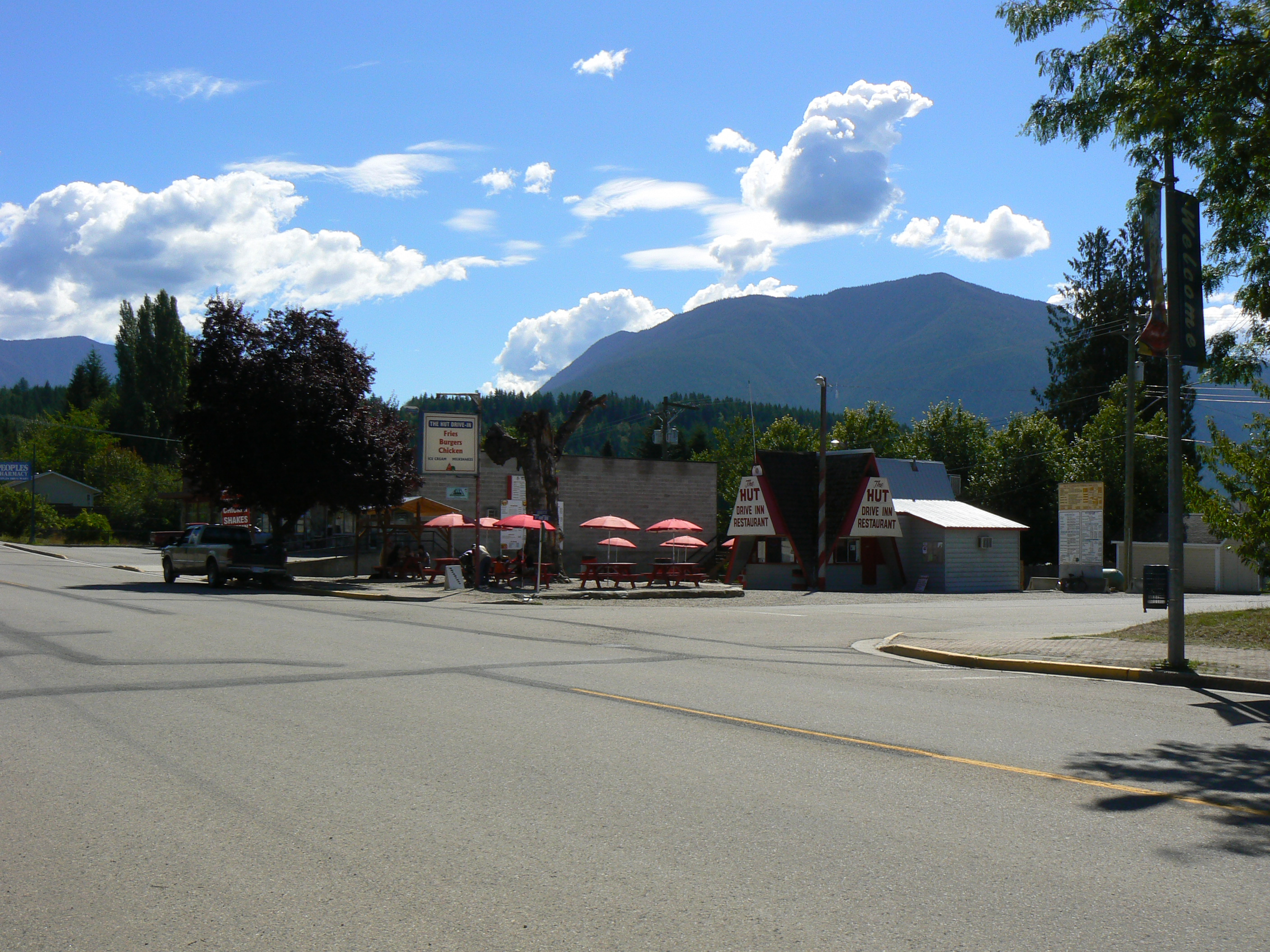
The Hut

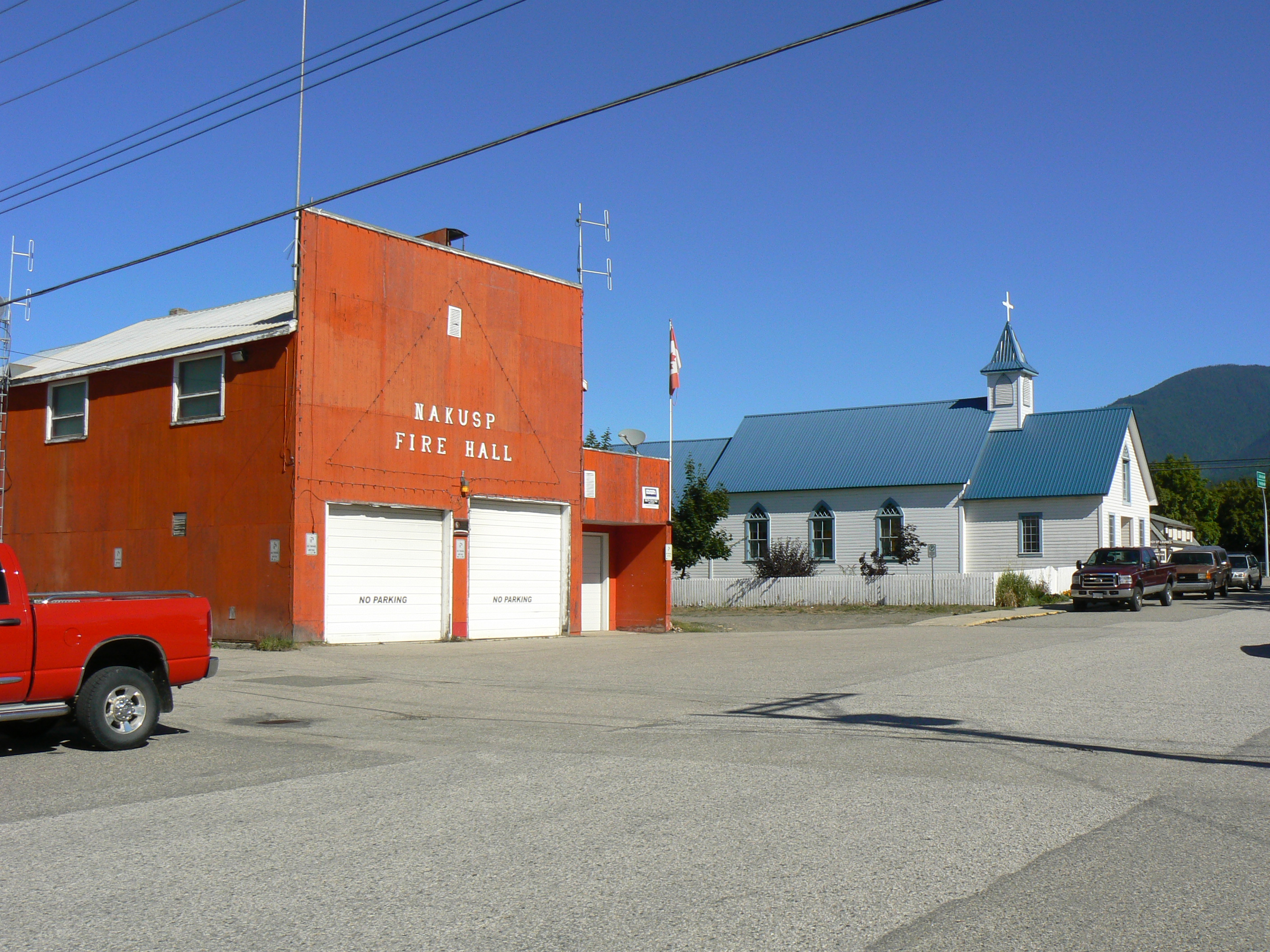
The Old Nakusp Fire Hall

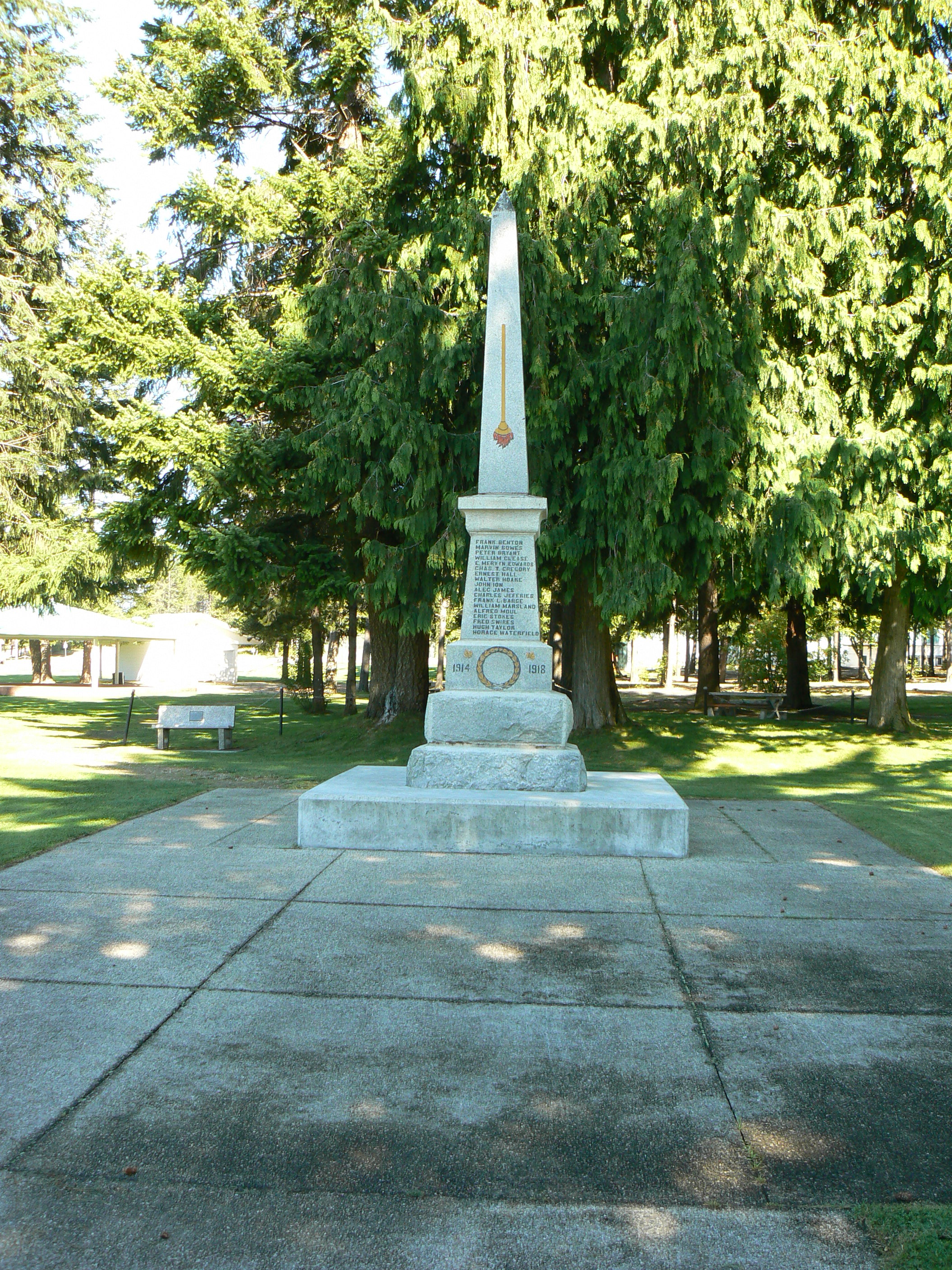
Cenotaph

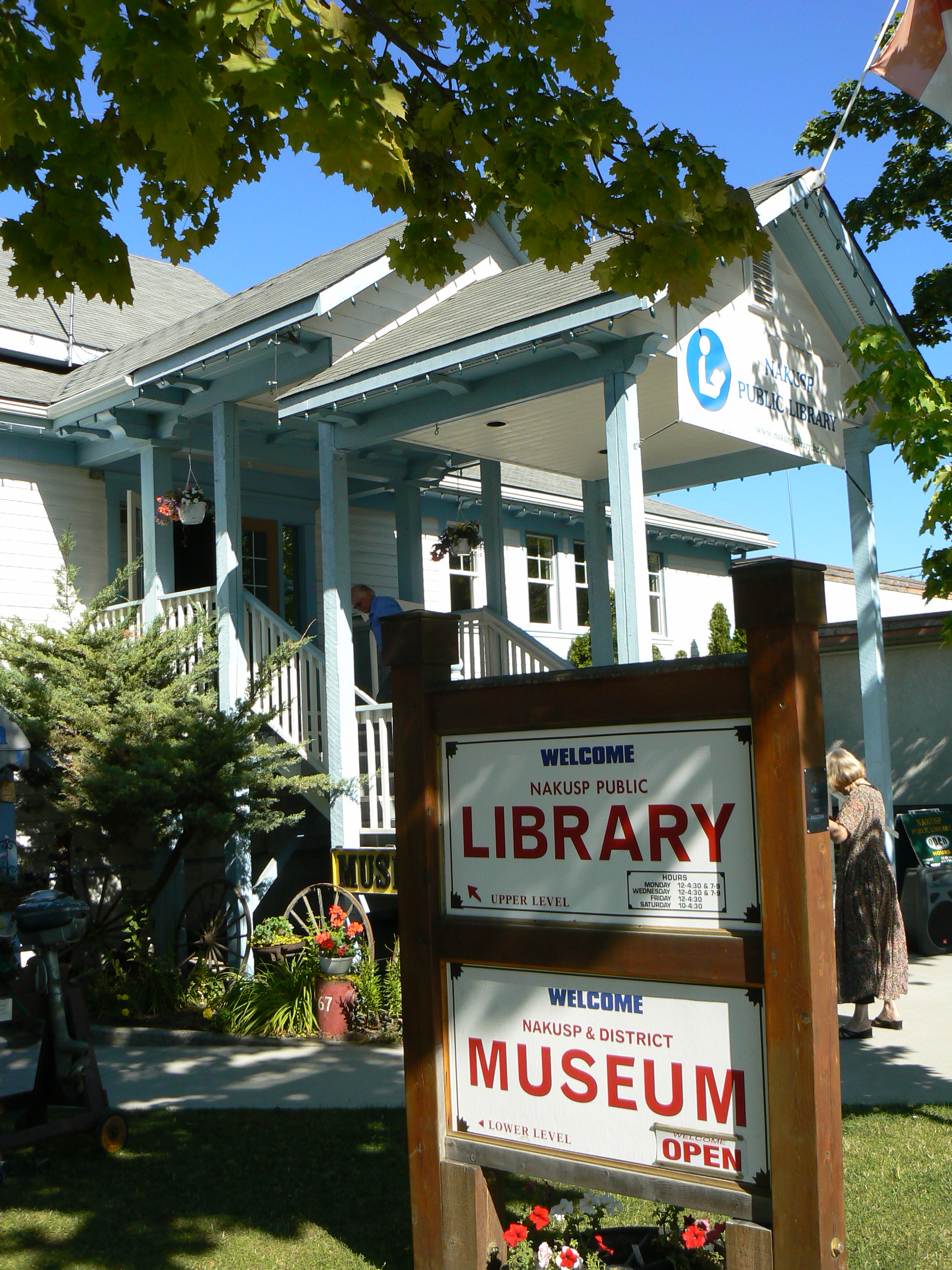
Nakusp Museum and Library

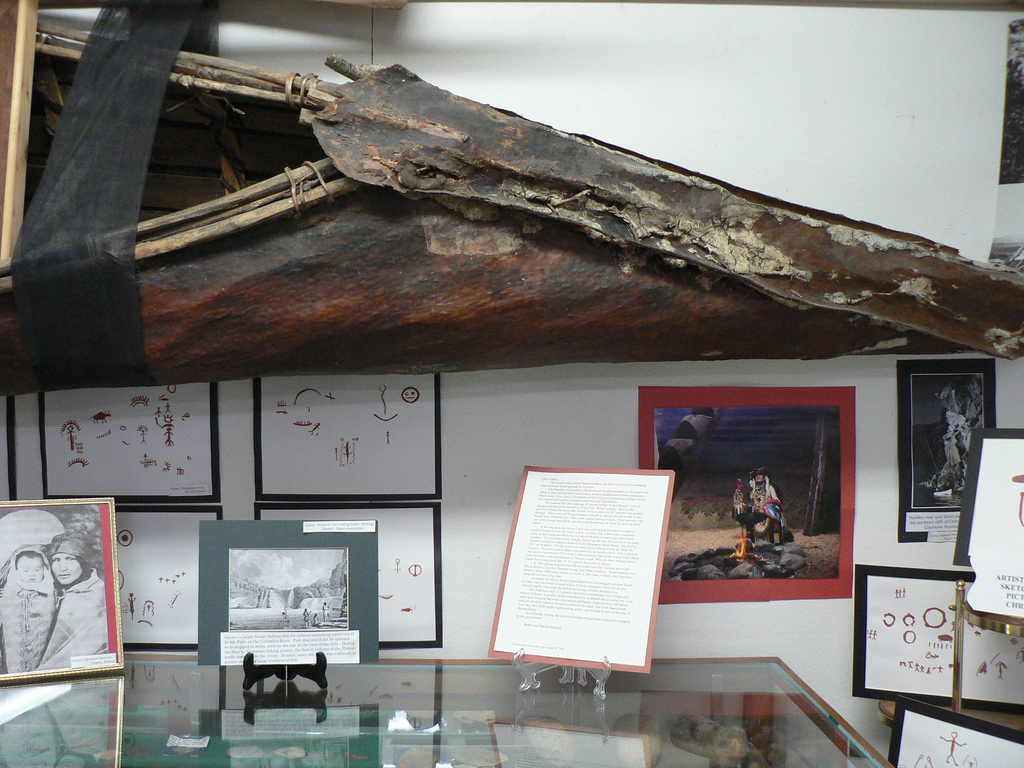
Sturgeon-nosed canoe and information on traditional Sinixt culture at the Nakusp Museum

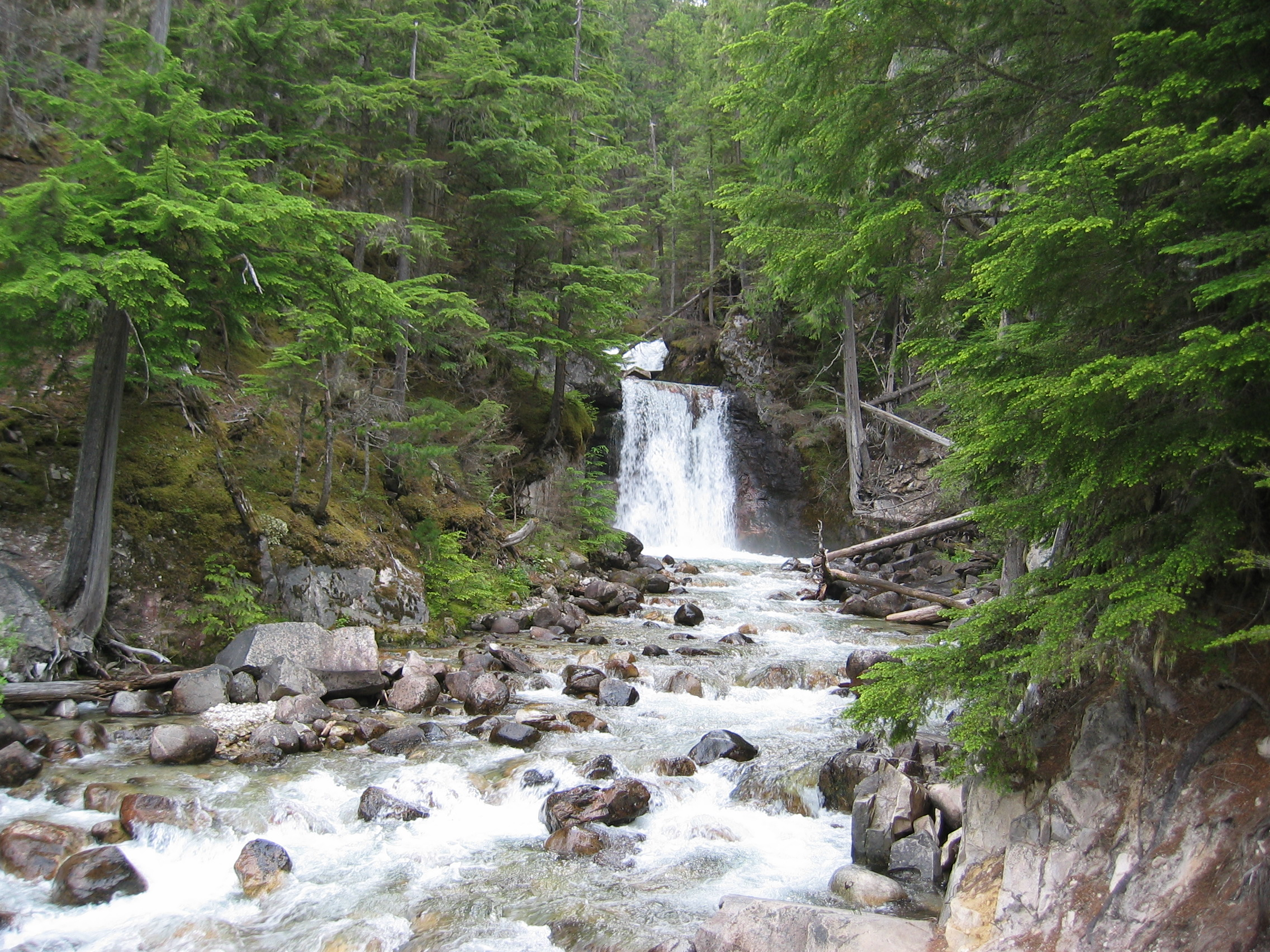
Along the road to Nakusp Hot Springs

== See also ==
- Steamboats of the Arrow Lakes
