= Mitch Zorn =

Canadian country music singer and songwriter

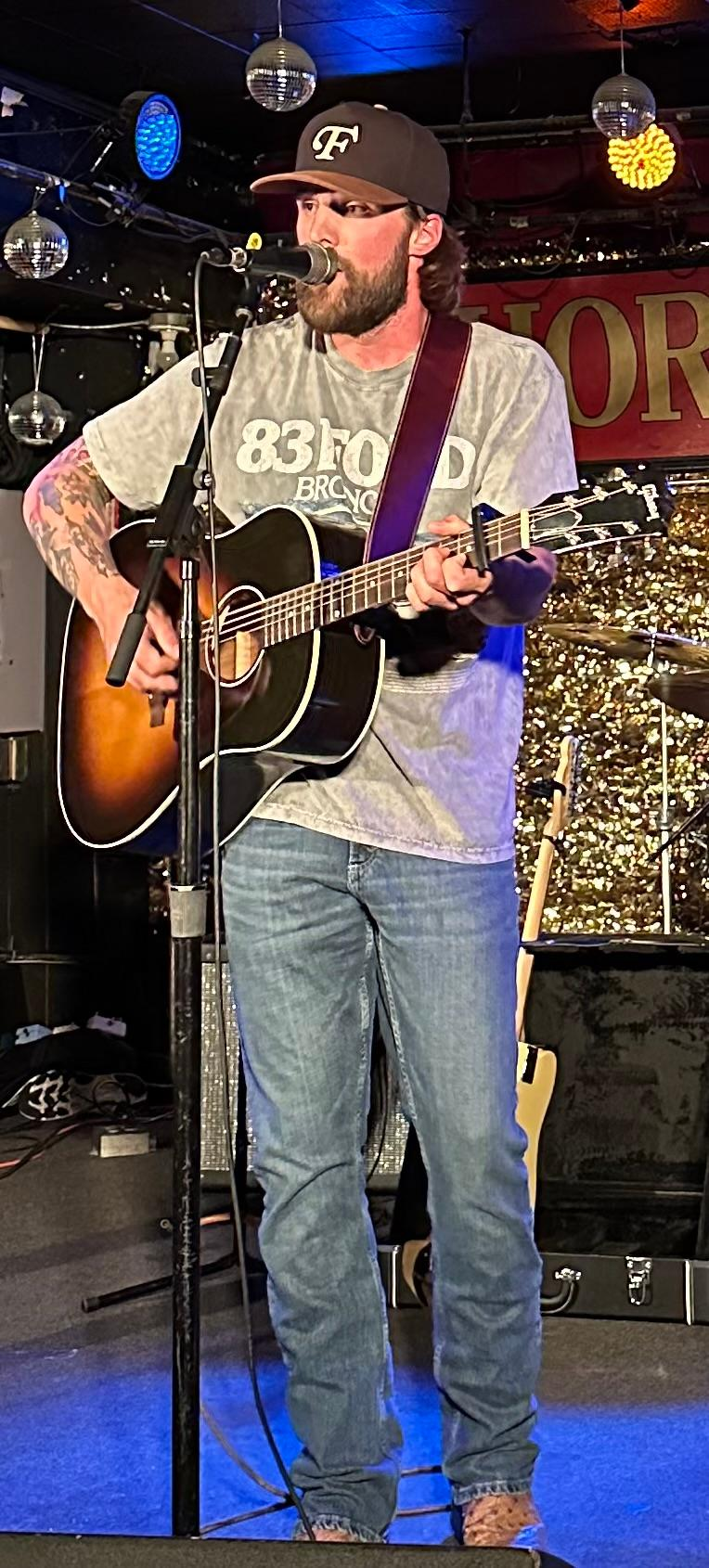
- Zorn performing at the Horseshoe Tavern in Toronto, Ontario, in June 2025

Background information
- Born: 1994 (age 31–32); Nakusp, British Columbia, Canada
- Genres: Country
- Occupations: Singer, songwriter
- Instruments: Guitar, vocals
- Years active: 2018-present
- Label: 604
- Website: Official website

Mitchell Edward Zorn is a Canadian country music singer and songwriter from Nakusp, British Columbia. He is currently signed to 604 Records. He has charted the singles "Home" and "Back to You" on the Canada Country chart. Zorn released a self-titled extended play in June 2025.

== Biography ==
Zorn grew up in Nakusp, British Columbia, where he played hockey, and went hunting and fishing from a young age. He received his first guitar when he was seven years old. Zorn began performing in a country-blues band with his father at eight years old, and he was writing his own songs by the age of twelve. He described Eric Church, Sam Hunt, and John Mayer as the three biggest influences on his music. Zorn graduated from high school in 2012.

In 2016, Zorn started an electrical apprenticeship, which led to a job in the Alberta oil sands. He later relocated to San Antonio, Texas, for similar work in the oil fields, which allowed him to spend his off-time in Nashville, Tennessee, developing as a songwriter. In 2018, Zorn wrote the song "Humboldt" to honour the victims and survivors of the Humboldt Broncos bus crash. Zorn lived and worked in the United States for over four years, splitting his time between Texas and Tennessee. He returned to Canada in 2021, and moved to Kelowna, British Columbia. Zorn was a wild card finalist in the 2023 Boots and Hearts Emerging Artist Showcase.

In June 2024, after signing with 604 Records, Zorn released his debut radio single "Home". The song would reach the top 30 of the Canada Country chart. He released the follow-up single "Back to You" in February 2025. Zorn was a semi-finalist in the 2025 SiriusXM Top of the Country contest. On June 20, 2025, Zorn released a self-titled extended play Mitch Zorn through 604. The EP is five tracks long, and includes "Home", "Back to You", and the single "Think of Me". In the fall of 2025, Zorn performed as an opening act across Canada on select dates of Jess Moskaluke's "Life for Me Tour" and a portion of James Barker Band's "Bud Light Buckle Up Tour".

== Discography ==
=== Extended plays ===
List of EPs, with selected details
| Title | Details |
|---|---|
| Mitch Zorn | Release date: June 20, 2025; Label: 604; Format: Digital download, streaming |

=== Singles ===
| Year | Title | Peak chart positions | Album |
| Year | Title | CAN Country | Album |
|---|---|---|---|
| 2024 | "Home" | 28 | Mitch Zorn |
| 2025 | "Back to You" | 53 | Mitch Zorn |
| 2025 | "Think of Me" | — | Mitch Zorn |
"—" denotes releases that did not chart.

=== Music videos ===
| Year | Video | Director |
|---|---|---|
| 2024 | "Home" | Matthew Miller |
