= Cope station =

Historic train depot in South Caronina, US

- Cope Depot
- U.S. National Register of Historic Places
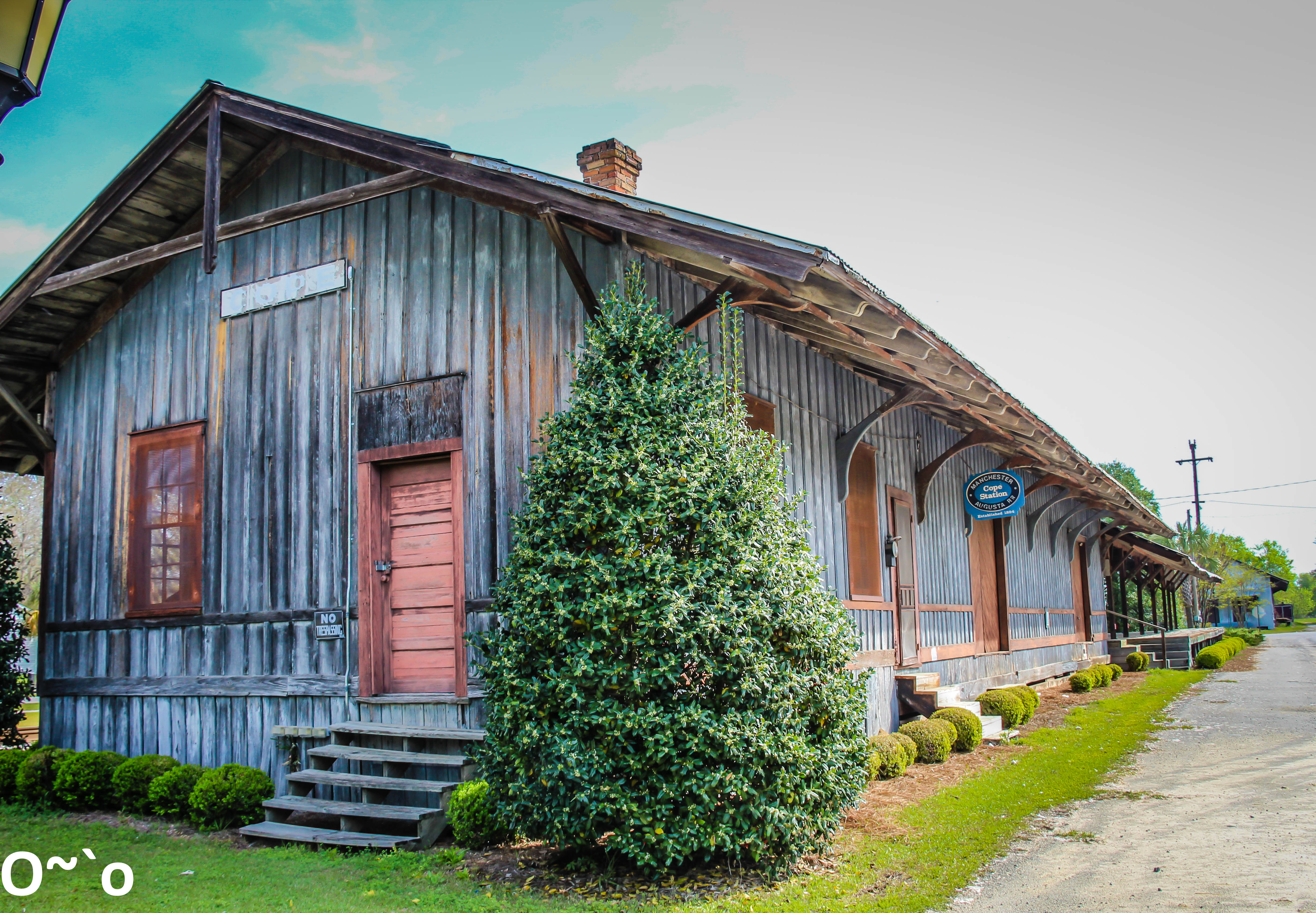
- Cope, SC Depot

- Location within South Carolina Location within the United States
- Location: Cope Rd., Cope, South Carolina
- Coordinates: 33.37775°N 81.00772°W
- Area: less than one acre
- Built: 1893
- Architectural style: Late 19th And Early 20th Century American Movements
- NRHP reference No.: 01000298

The Cope Depot, or Manchester and Augusta Railroad Station in Cope, South Carolina was a privately owned railroad depot built in 1893. It was built by the Manchester and Augusta Railroad six years before being acquired by the Atlantic Coast Line Railroad as part of their Florence—Robbins Line. The depot is located along what is today the CSX Orangeburg Subdivision, and was added to the National Register of Historic Places in 2001.

== Gallery ==
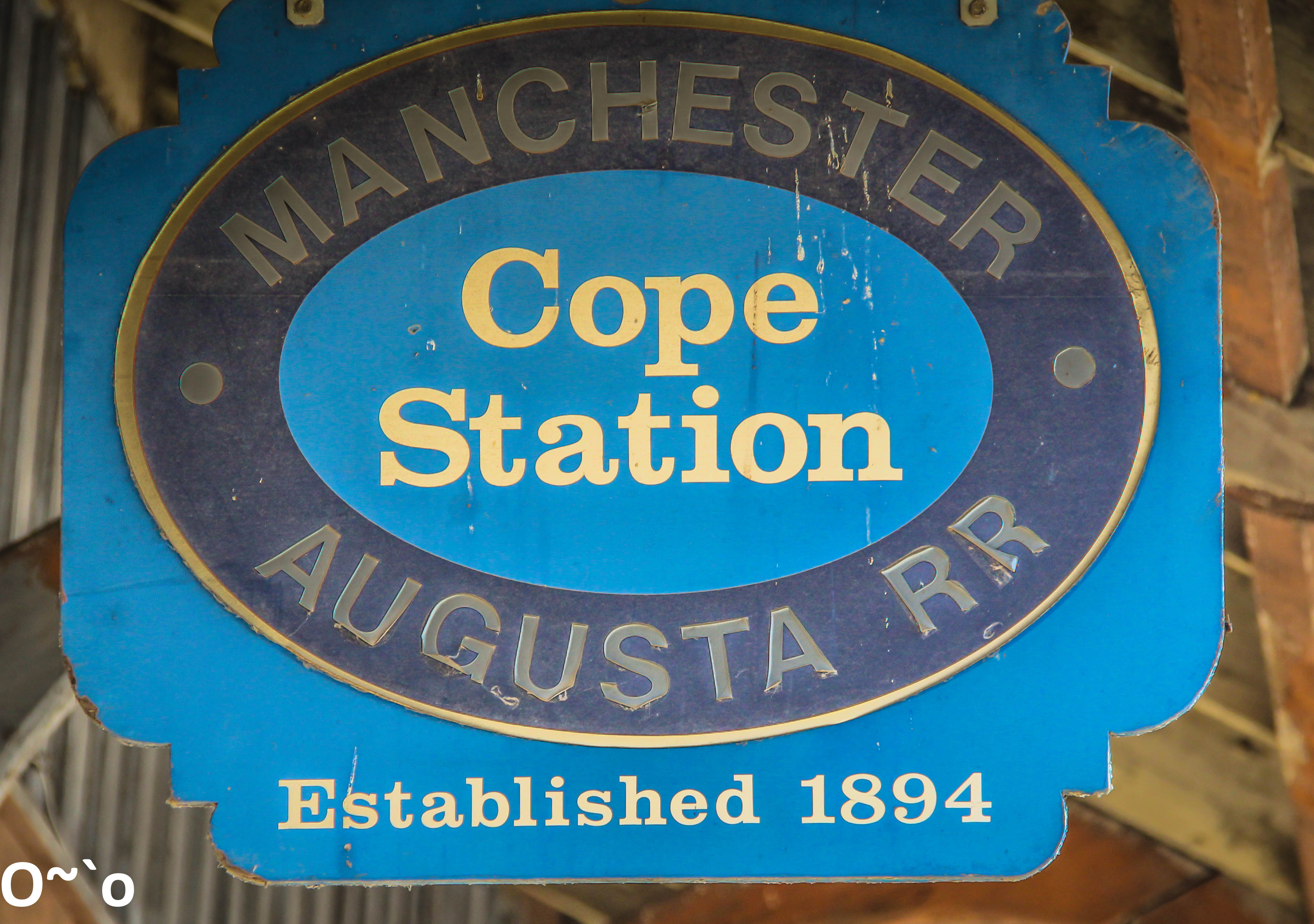
Cope Station Manchester and Augusta Railroad

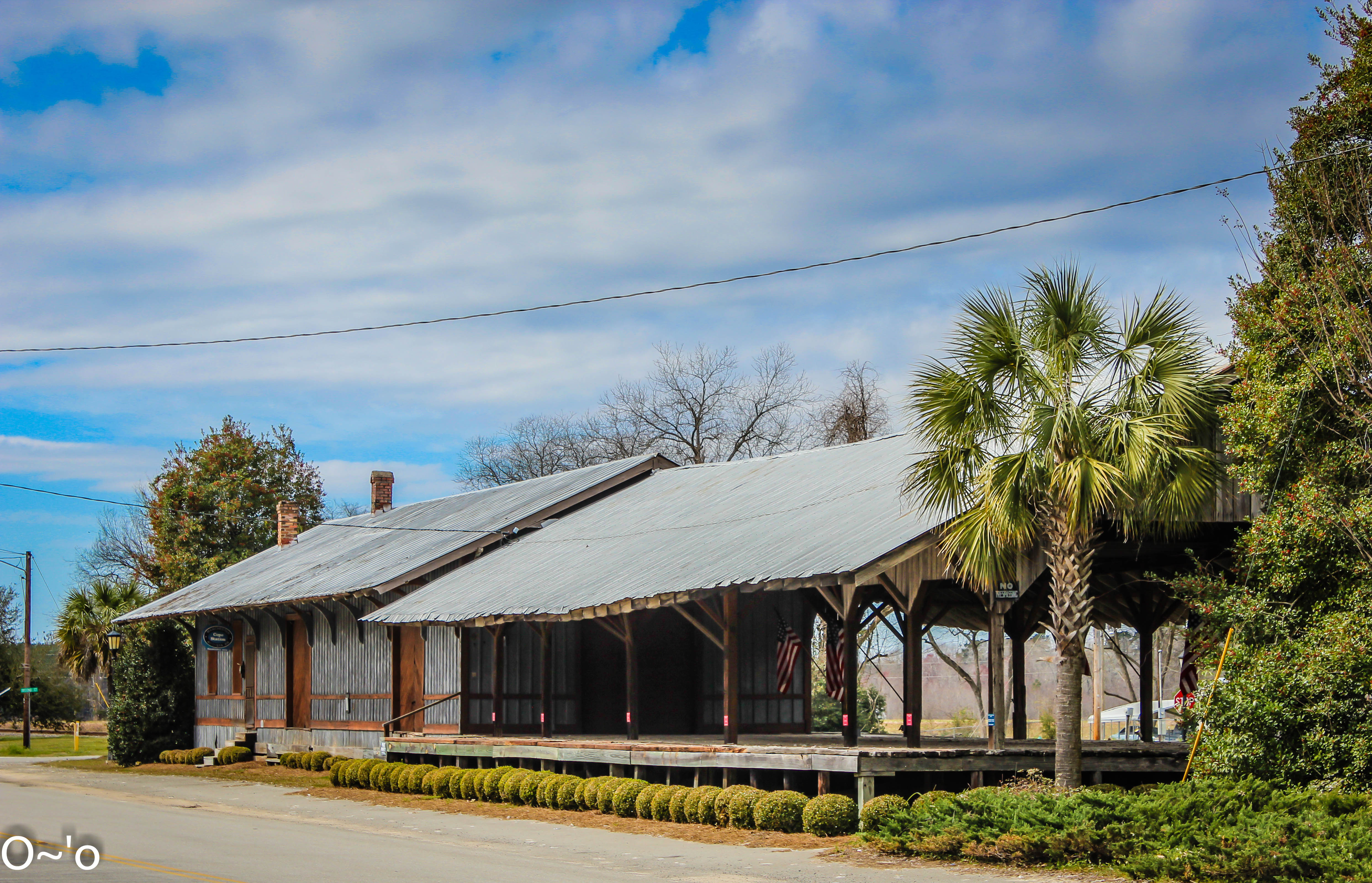
Cope, SC Manchester and Augusta Railroad Station

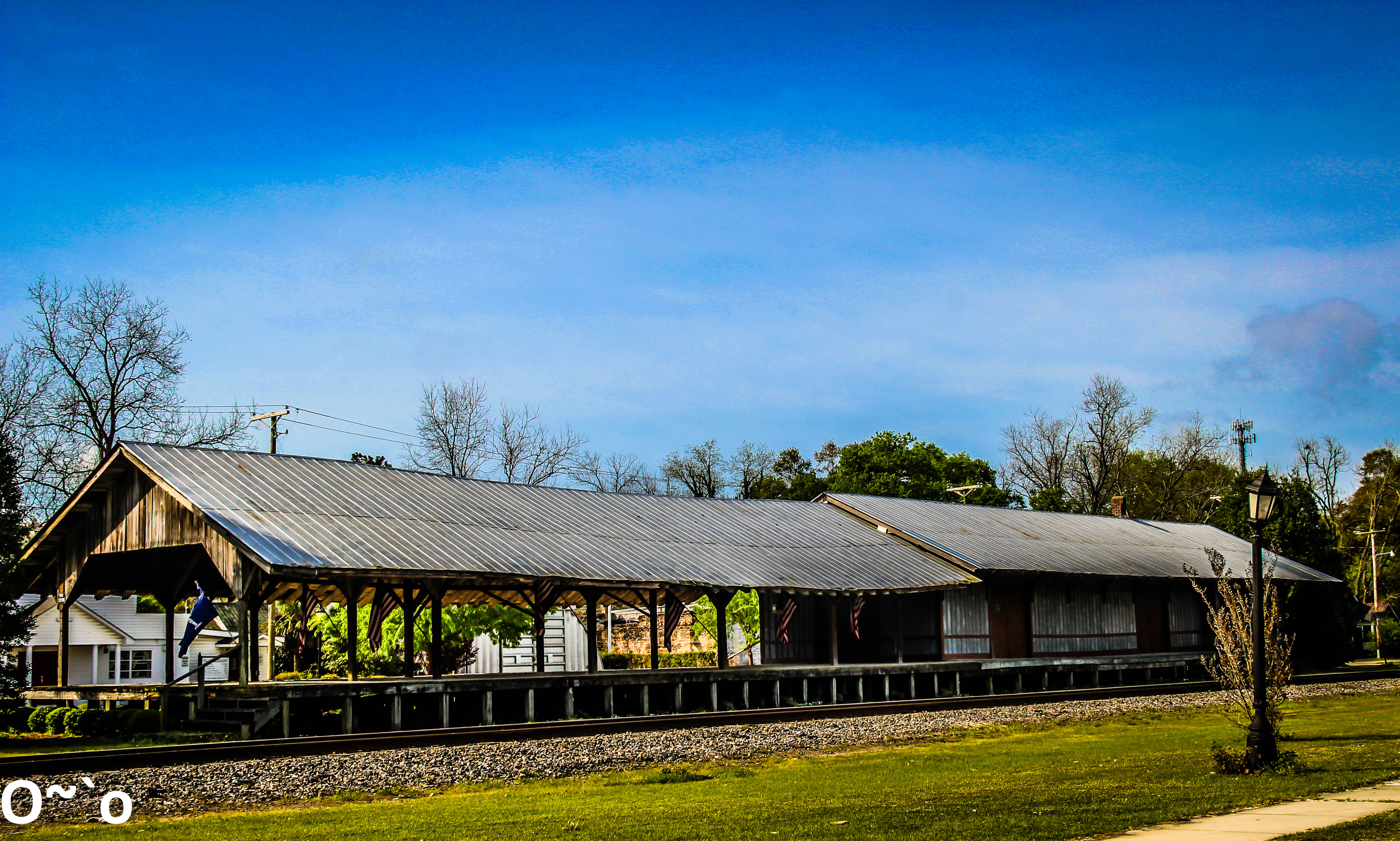
Cope, SC Manchester and Augusta Railroad Station

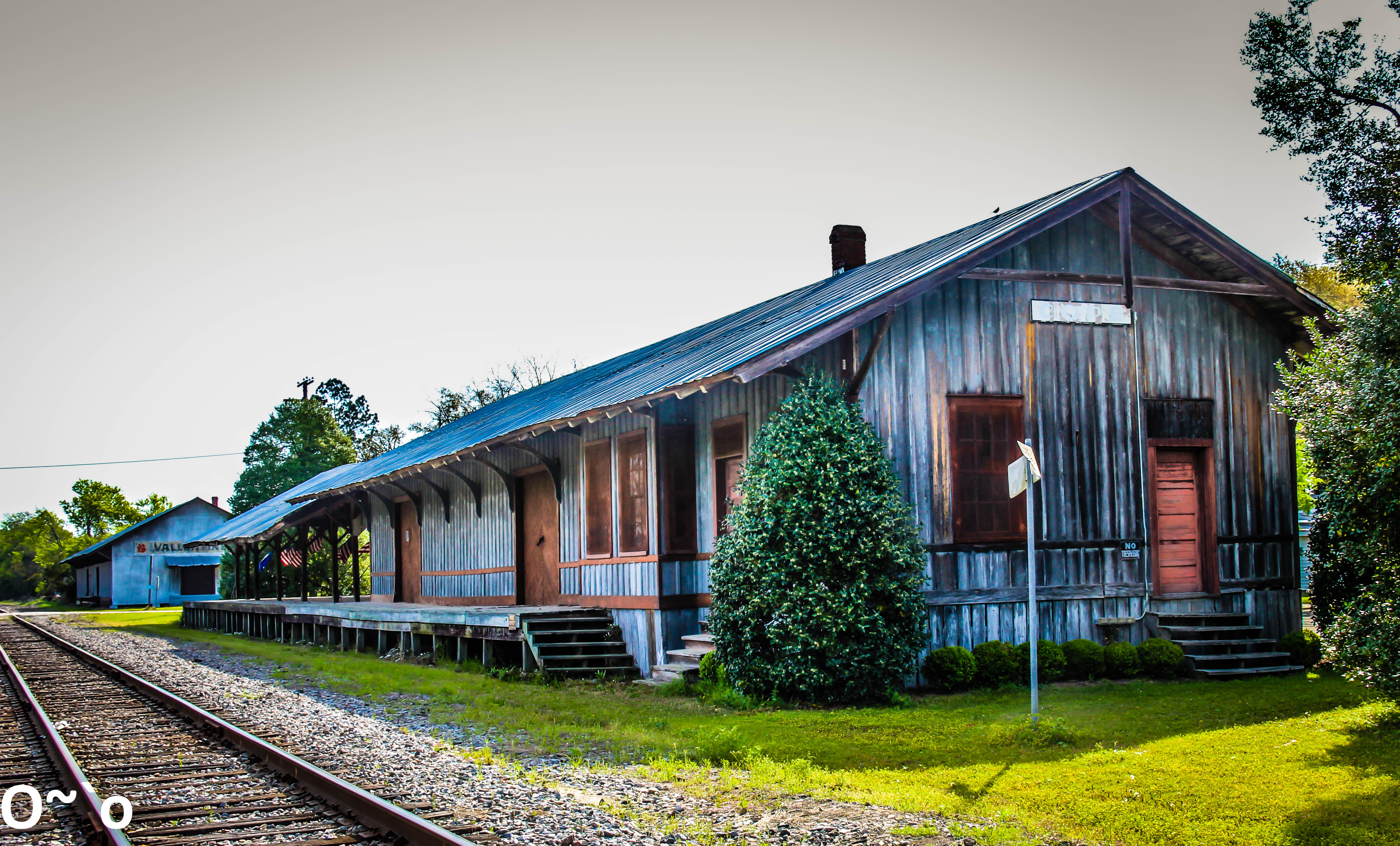
Cope, SC Manchester and Augusta Railroad Station

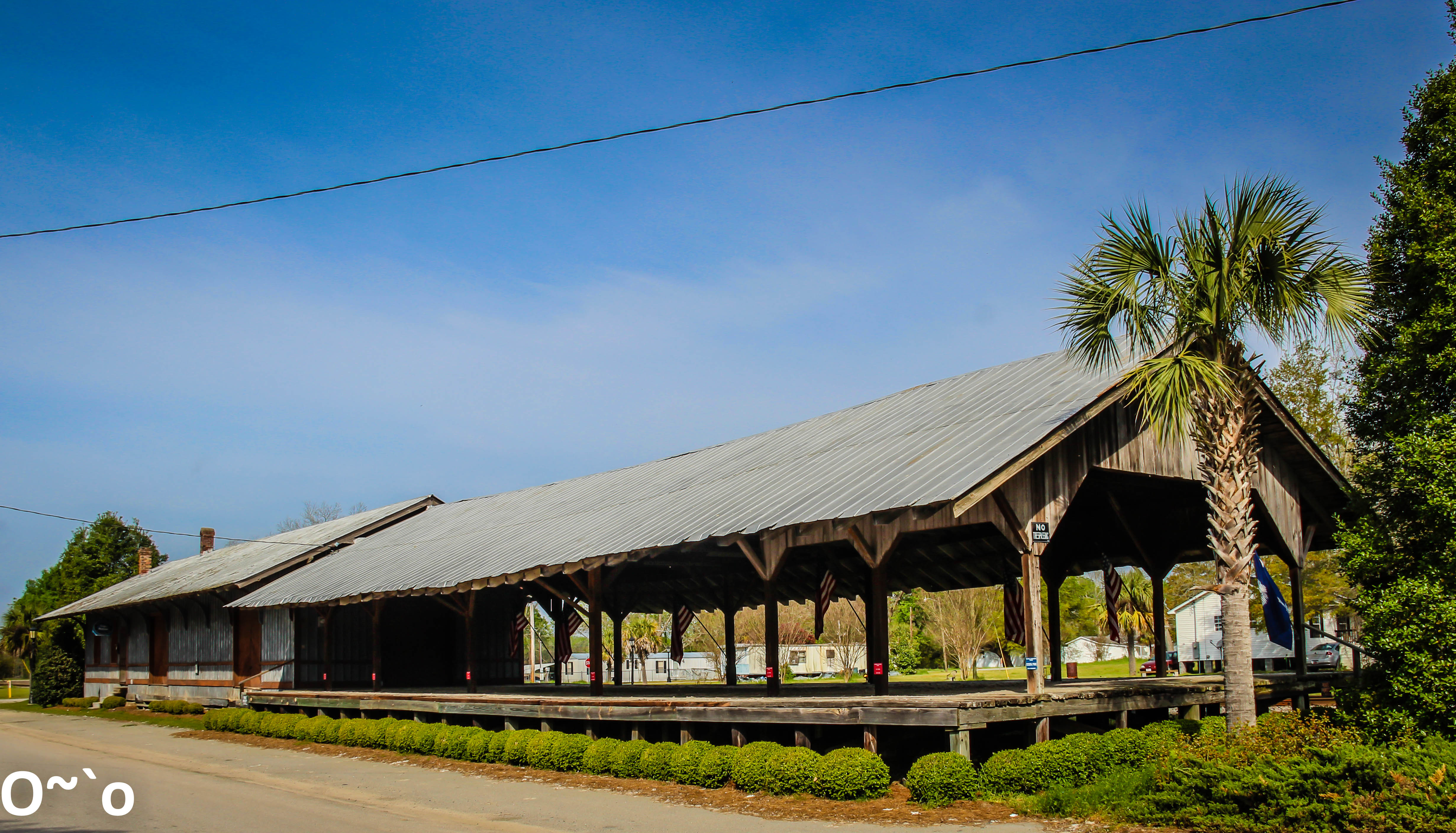
Cope, SC Manchester and Augusta Railroad Station

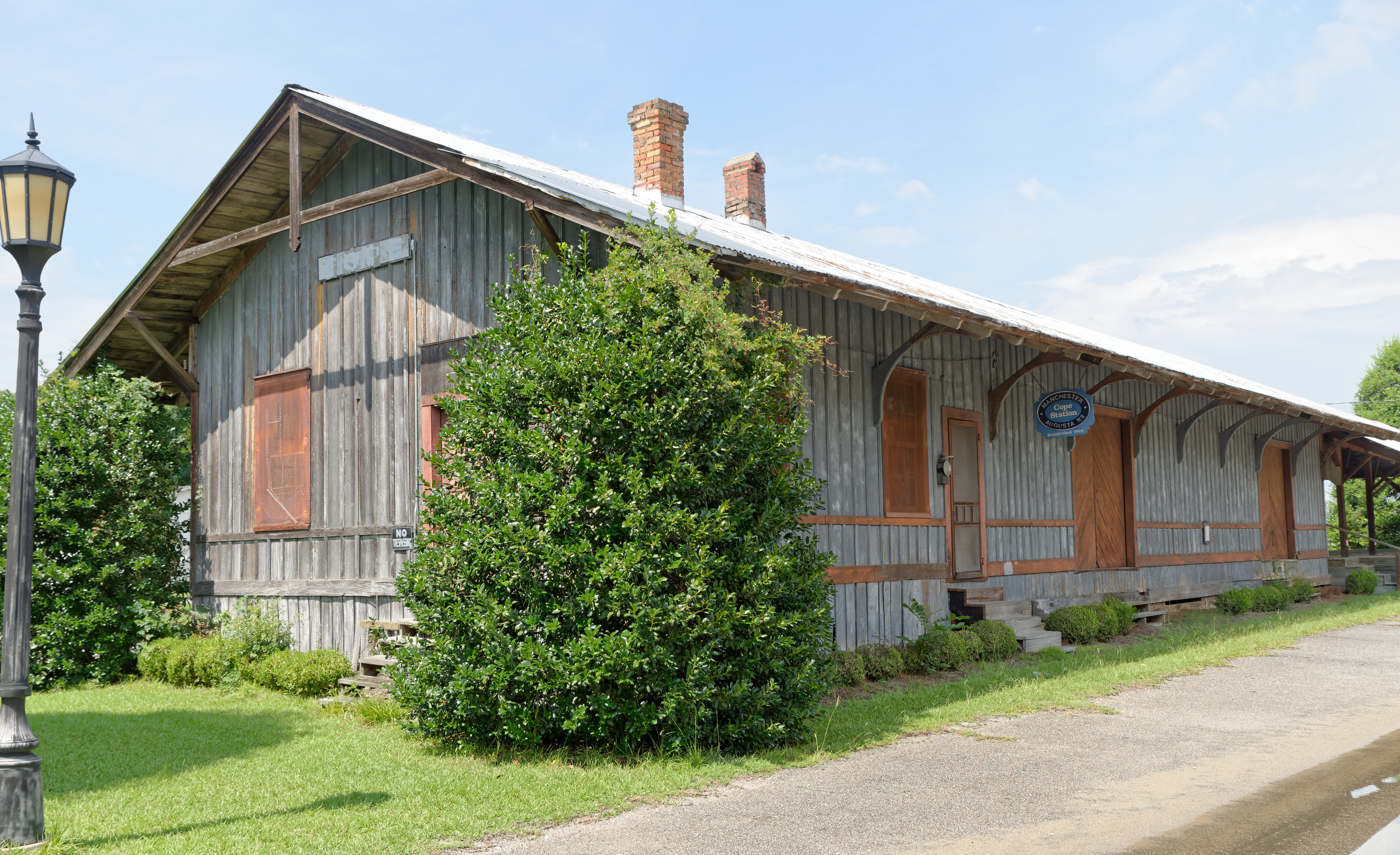

== See also ==
- Cope, South Carolina
