= Sawyer Bay =

Bay in Nunavut, Canada

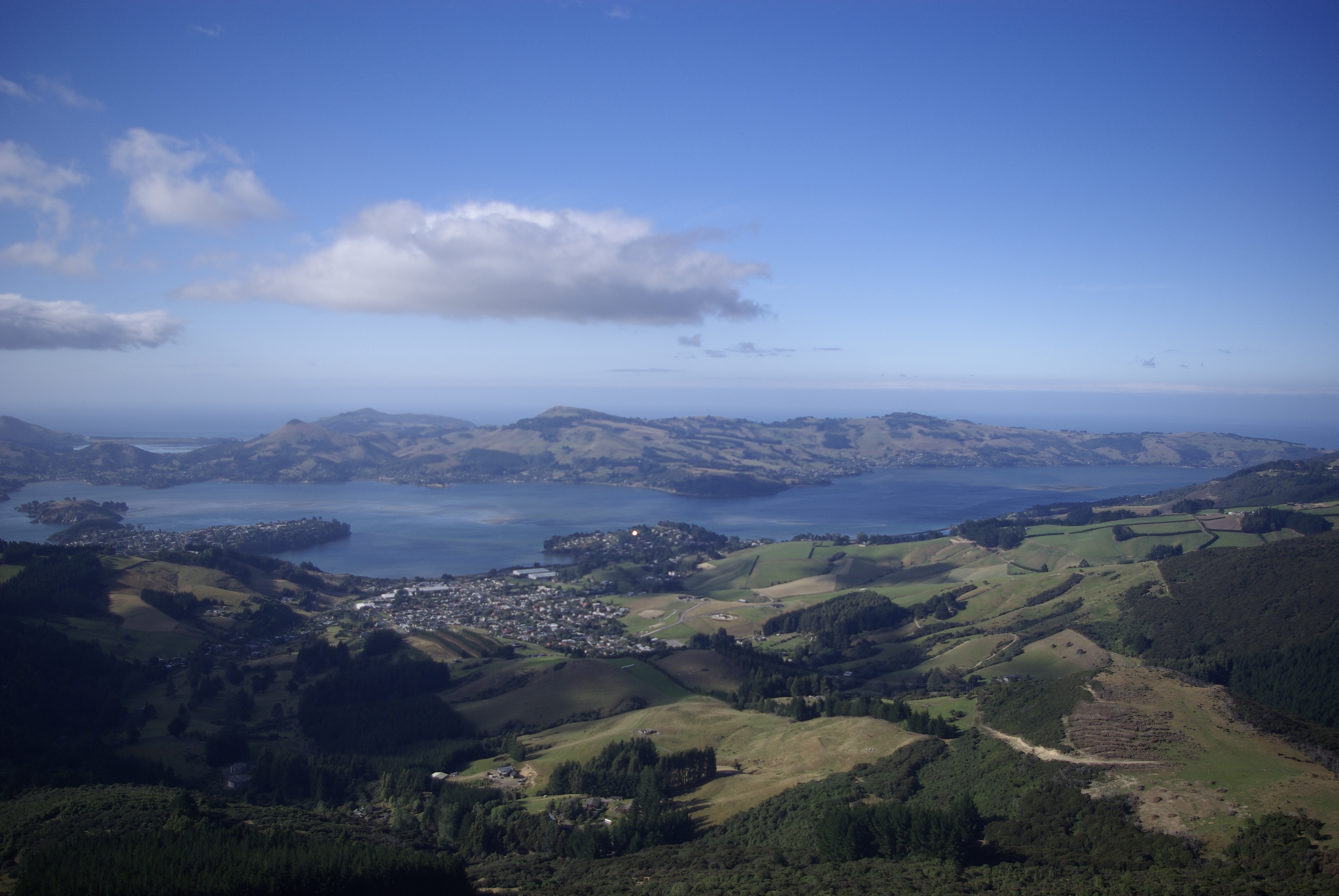
- Sawyer Bay

- Location within Nunavut
- Location: Nares Strait
- Coordinates: 79°19′N 77°33′W
- Ocean/sea sources: Arctic Ocean
- Basin countries: Canada
- Settlements: Uninhabited

Sawyer Bay is an Arctic waterway in the Qikiqtaaluk Region, Nunavut, Canada. It is located in Nares Strait by eastern Ellesmere Island. Benedict Glacier fills the head of the bay.

== Exploration ==
Robert Peary's 1905-1906 exploration included this bay.
