= Cope Mountain =

Mountain in Alaska, United States

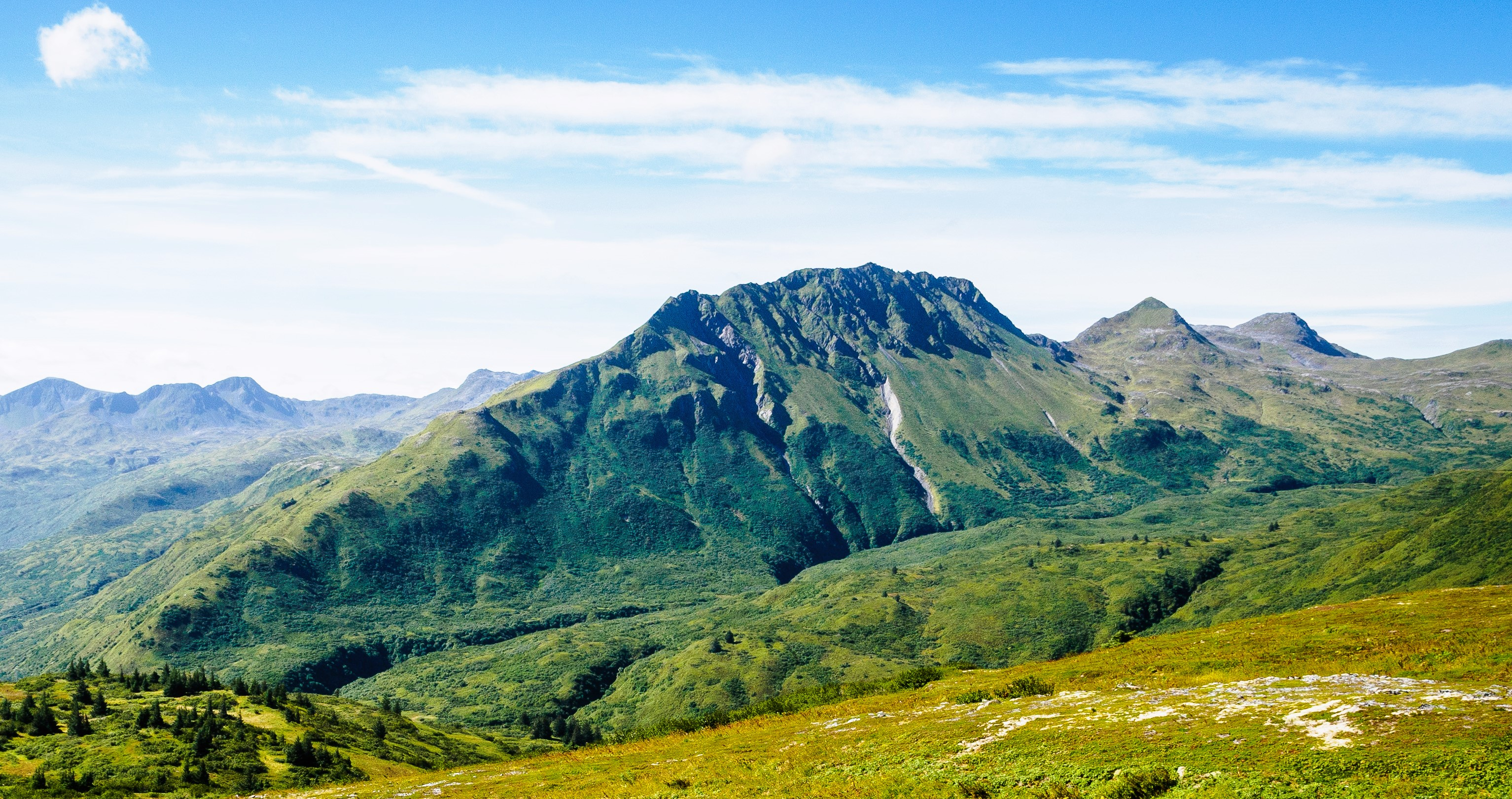
- East aspect

Highest point
- Elevation: 2,496 ft (761 m)
- Prominence: 430 ft (131 m)
- Parent peak: Erskine Mountain (2,657 ft)
- Isolation: 1.29 mi (2.08 km)
- Coordinates: 57°43′53″N 152°36′59″W

Naming
- Etymology: Harry P. Cope

Geography
- Location within Alaska
- Country: United States
- State: Alaska
- Borough: Kodiak Island Borough
- Parent range: Kodiak Archipelago
- Topo map: USGS Kodiak C-2

Cope Mountain is a 2,496-foot-elevation (761-meter) summit in Alaska.

== Description ==
Cope Mountain is located nine miles (14 km) southwest of Kodiak on the northeast coast of Kodiak Island. Precipitation runoff from the mountain drains into Sargent Creek thence Womens Bay. Topographic relief is significant as the summit rises 2,400 feet (732 meters) above Sargent Creek in approximately one mile (1.6 km) and the east face rises 1,700 feet (518 meters) in 0.4 miles (0.64 km). The mountain's name was applied in 1910 by the United States Coast and Geodetic Survey to honor Harry P. Cope, an Englishman who arrived in Kodiak from San Francisco in 1868. He was the first postmaster at Kodiak and was known locally as "Uncle Harry." The toponym was officially adopted in 1941 by the United States Board on Geographic Names.

== Climate ==
According to the Köppen climate classification system, Cope Mountain is located in a subpolar oceanic climate zone with cold, snowy winters, and cool summers. Weather systems coming off the North Pacific are forced upwards by the mountains (orographic lift), causing heavy precipitation in the form of rainfall and snowfall. Winter temperatures can drop to 0 °F with wind chill factors below −10 °F.

== See also ==
- List of mountain peaks of Alaska
- Geography of Alaska
