= Cope, South Carolina =

- Town
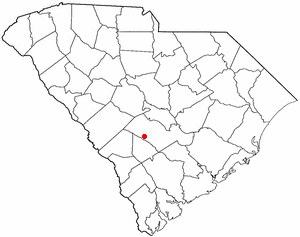
- Location in Orangeburg County
- Coordinates: 32°22′33″N 81°00′30″W
- Country: United States
- State: South Carolina
- County: Orangeburg

Area
  - Total: 0.25 sq mi (0.65 km^{2})
  - Land: 0.25 sq mi (0.65 km^{2})
  - Water: 0 sq mi (0.00 km^{2})
- Elevation: 197 ft (60 m)

Population (2020)
  - Total: 37
  - Density: 148.2/sq mi (57.22/km^{2})
- Time zone: UTC-5 (EST)
  - Summer (DST): UTC-4 (EDT)
- ZIP code: 29038
- Area codes: 803, 839
- FIPS code: 45-16720
- GNIS feature ID: 2406311

Cope is a town in Orangeburg County, South Carolina, United States. The population was 37 at the 2020 census, a decline from 77 in 2010, making it the least populous town in South Carolina.

== History ==
Cope Depot was added to the National Register of Historic Places in 2001.

== Geography ==
According to the United States Census Bureau, the town has a total area of 0.2 square miles (0.52 km^{2}), all land.

== Demographics ==
Historical population
Census	Pop.	Note	%±
1900	80		—
1910	174		117.5%
1920	266		52.9%
1930	231		−13.2%
1940	280		21.2%
1950	209		−25.4%
1960	227		8.6%
1970	202		−11.0%
1980	167		−17.3%
1990	124		−25.7%
2000	107		−13.7%
2010	77		−28.0%
2020	37		−51.9%
2022 (est.)	33	▼	−10.8%
U.S. Decennial Census

=== 2020 census ===
Cope town, South Carolina – Racial and ethnic composition Note: the US Census treats Hispanic/Latino as an ethnic category. This table excludes Latinos from the racial categories and assigns them to a separate category. Hispanics/Latinos may be of any race.
Race / Ethnicity (NH = Non-Hispanic)	Pop 2000	Pop 2010	Pop 2020	% 2000	% 2010	% 2020
White alone (NH)	44	44	45	41.12%	57.14%	67.57%
Black or African American alone (NH)	60	31	7	56.07%	40.26%	18.92%
Native American or Alaska Native alone (NH)	0	0	3	0.00%	0.00%	8.11%
Asian alone (NH)	0	0	0	0.00%	0.00%	0.00%
Native Hawaiian or Pacific Islander alone (NH)	0	0	0	0.00%	0.00%	0.00%
Other race alone (NH)	0	0	0	0.00%	0.00%	0.00%
Mixed race or Multiracial (NH)	0	2	2	0.00%	2.60%	2.70%
Hispanic or Latino (any race)	3	3	7	2.80%	0.00%	10.77%
Total	107	80	65	100.00%	100.00%	100.00%

As of the census of 2010, there were 77 people, 13 households, and 12 families residing in the town. The population density was 431.7 inhabitants per square mile (166.7/km^{2}). There were 46 housing units at an average density of 185.6 per square mile (71.7/km^{2}). The racial makeup of the town was 41.12% White and 58.88% African American. Hispanic or Latino of any race were 2.80% of the population.

There were 38 households, out of which 36.8% had children under the age of 18 living with them, 39.5% were married couples living together, 26.3% had a female householder with no husband present, and 26.3% were non-families. 21.1% of all households were made up of individuals, and 2.6% had someone living alone who was 65 years of age or older. The average household size was 2.82 and the average family size was 3.29.

In the town, the population was spread out, with 32.7% under the age of 18, 3.7% from 18 to 24, 31.8% from 25 to 44, 20.6% from 45 to 64, and 11.2% who were 65 years of age or older. The median age was 35 years. For every 100 females, there were 87.7 males. For every 100 females age 18 and over, there were 80.0 males.

The median income for a household in the town was $28,056, and the median income for a family was $28,125. Males had a median income of $25,625 versus $30,417 for females. The per capita income for the town was $18,243. There were 20.0% of families and 24.4% of the population living below the poverty line, including 36.2% of under eighteen and 21.4% of those over 64.

== Historical sites ==
- Cope Depot

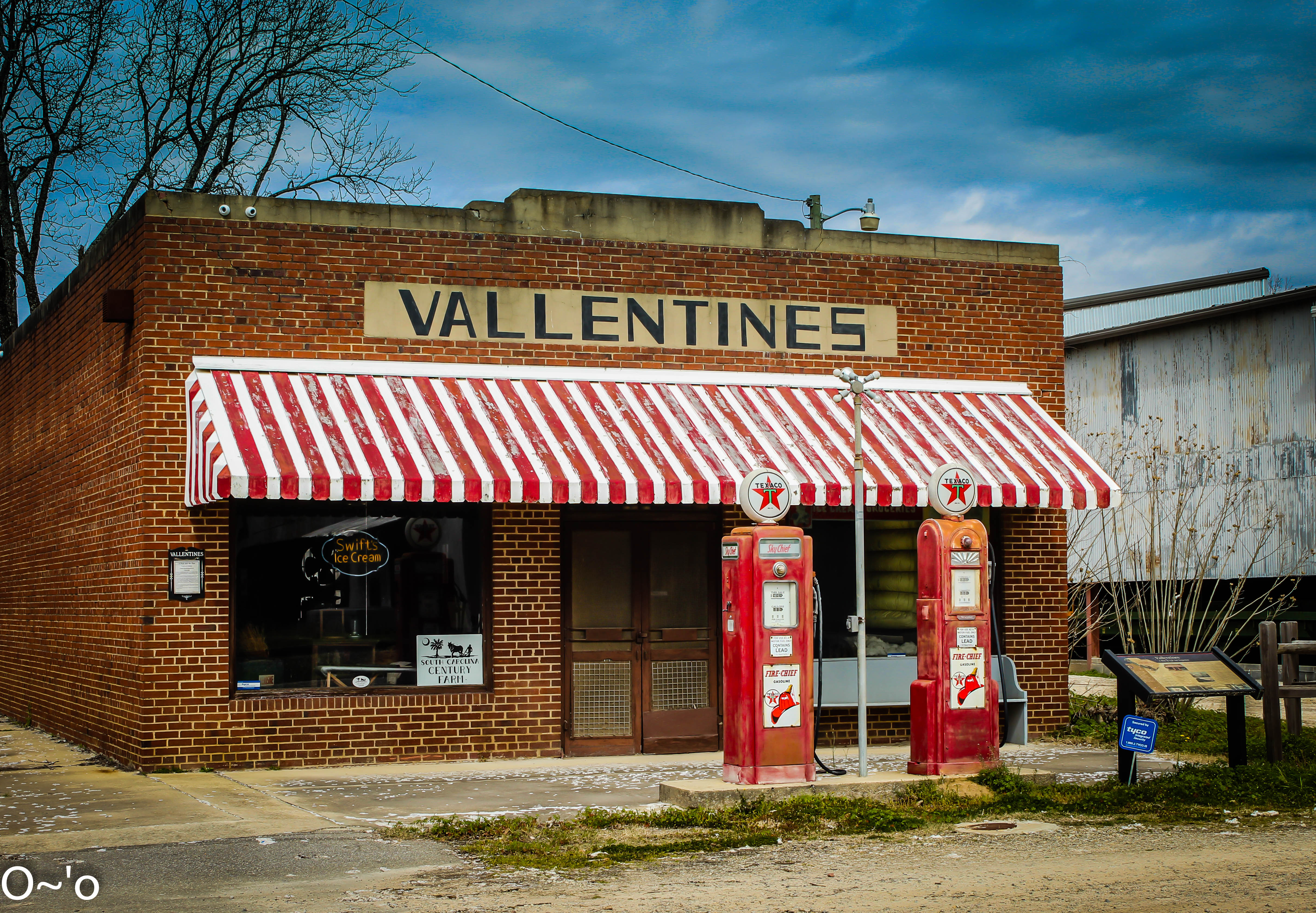
Vallentines General Store

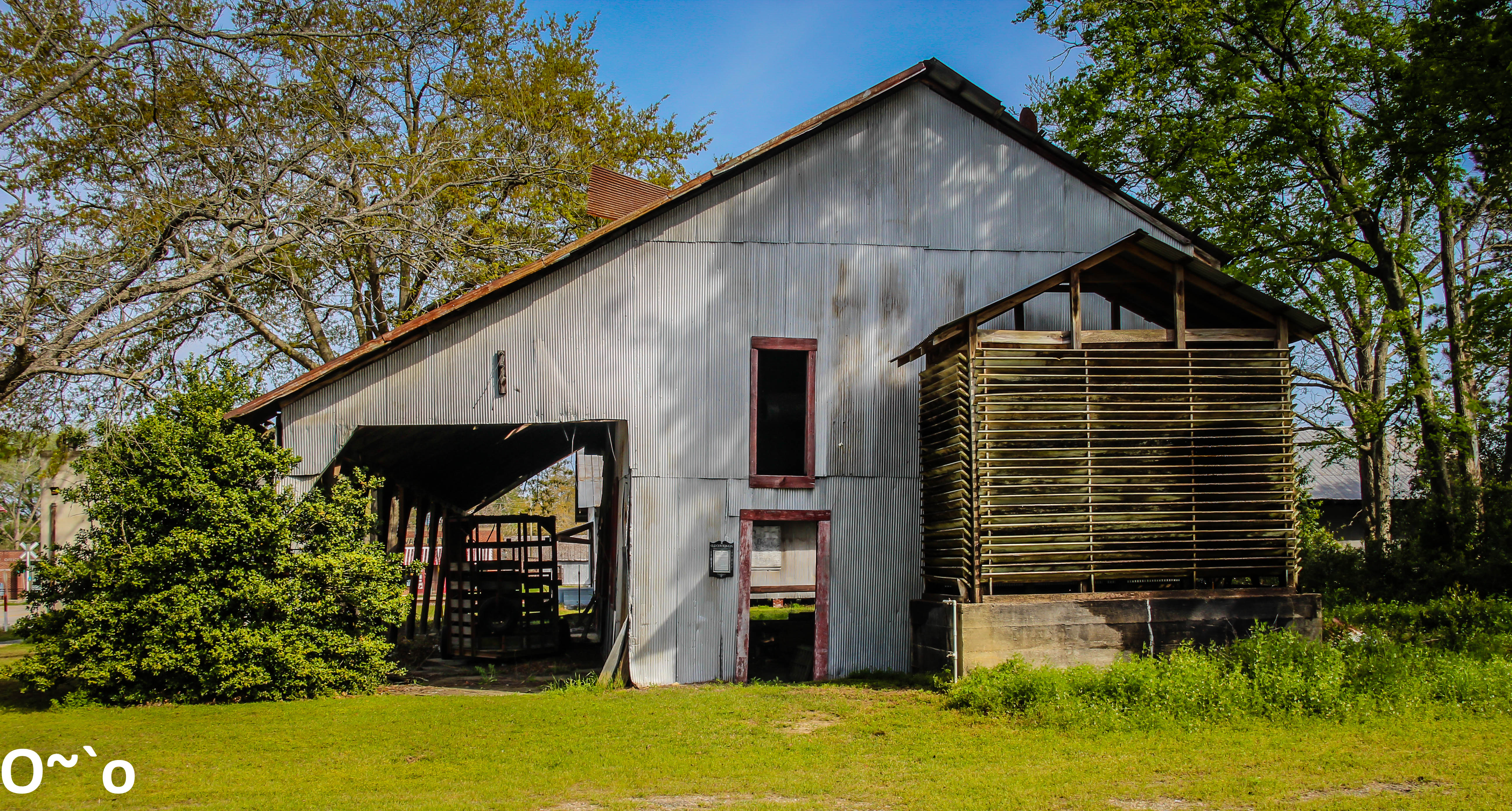
Vallentines Old Cotton Gin

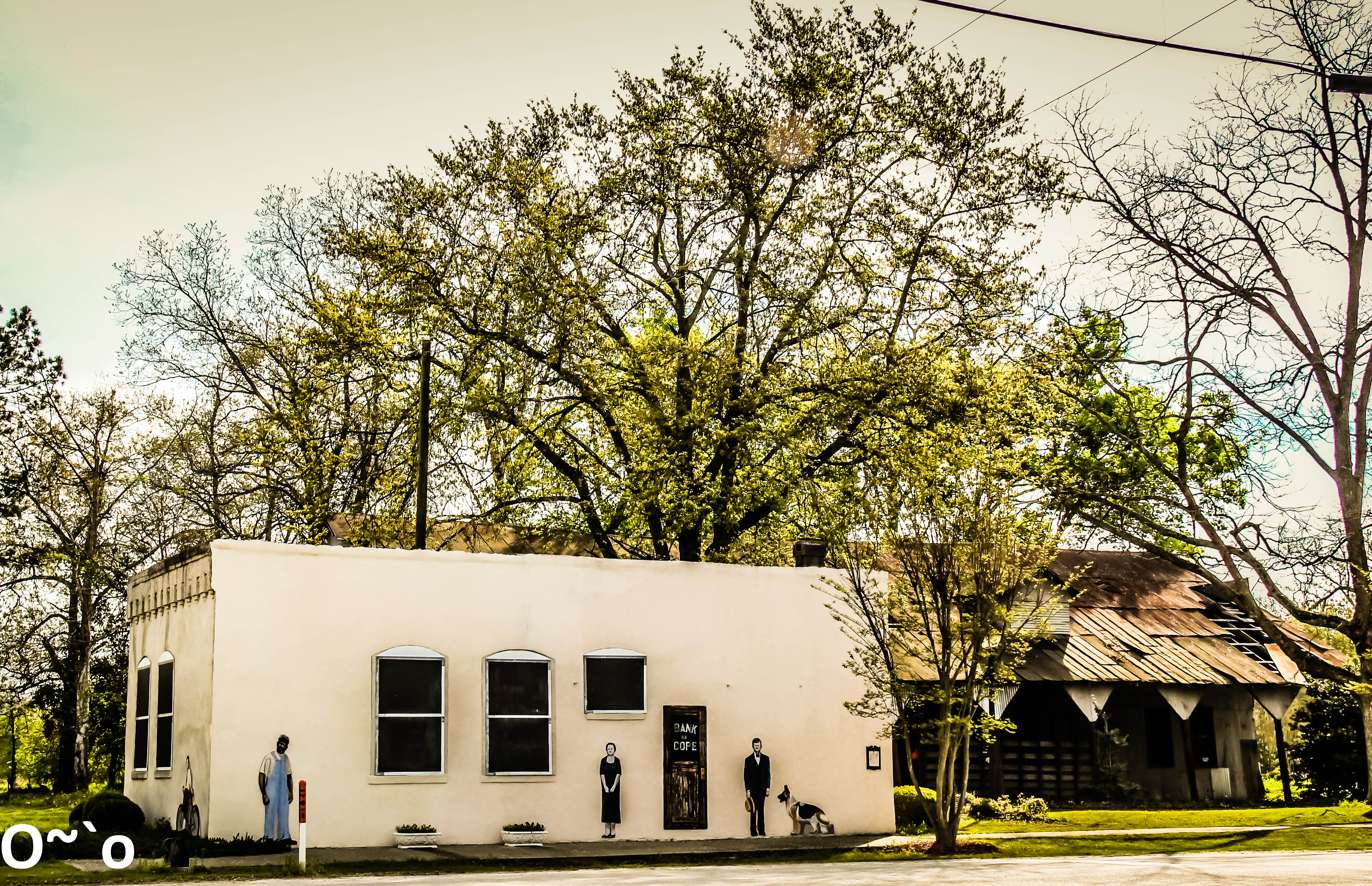
Bank of Cope

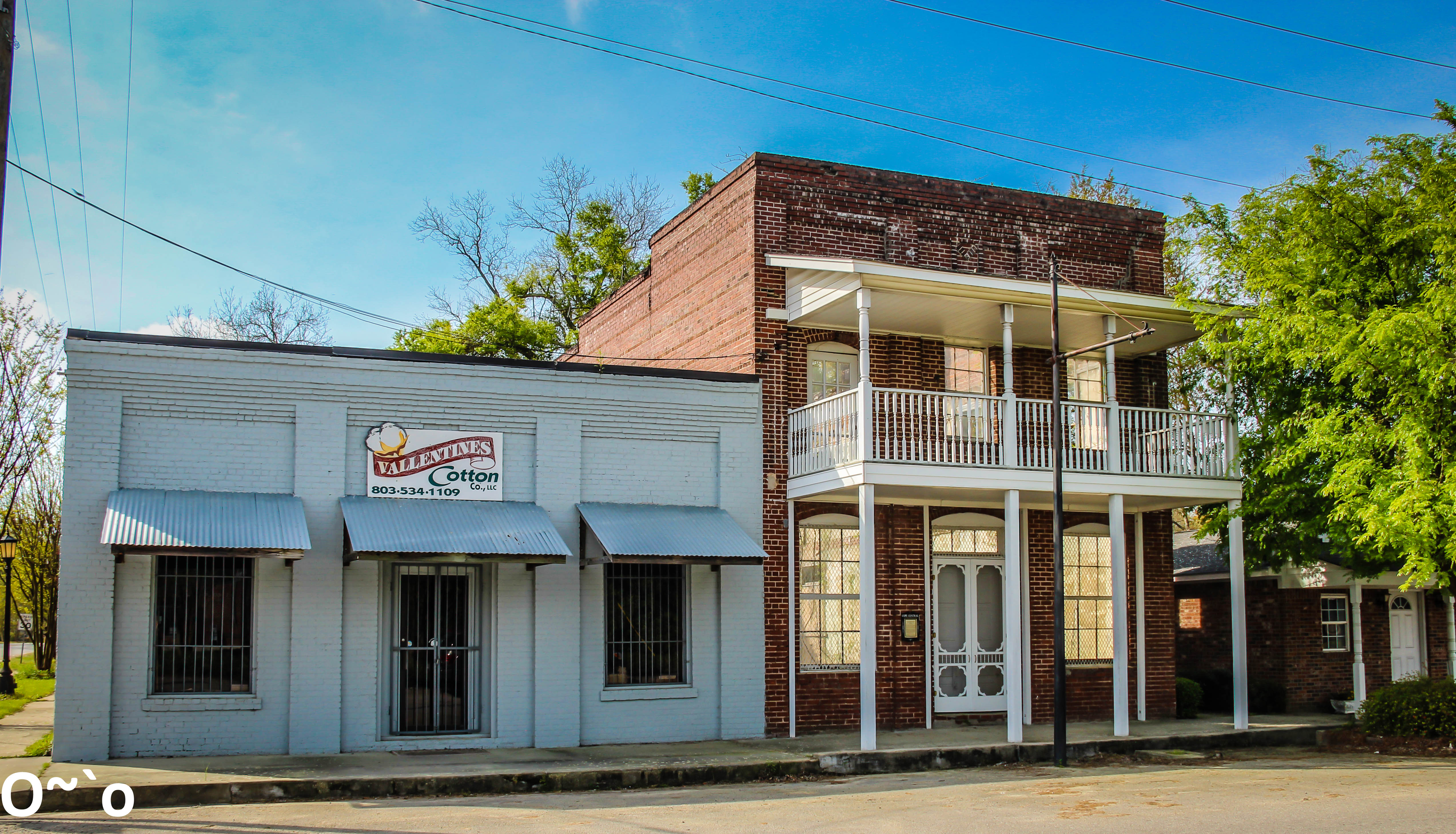
Vallentine Cotton

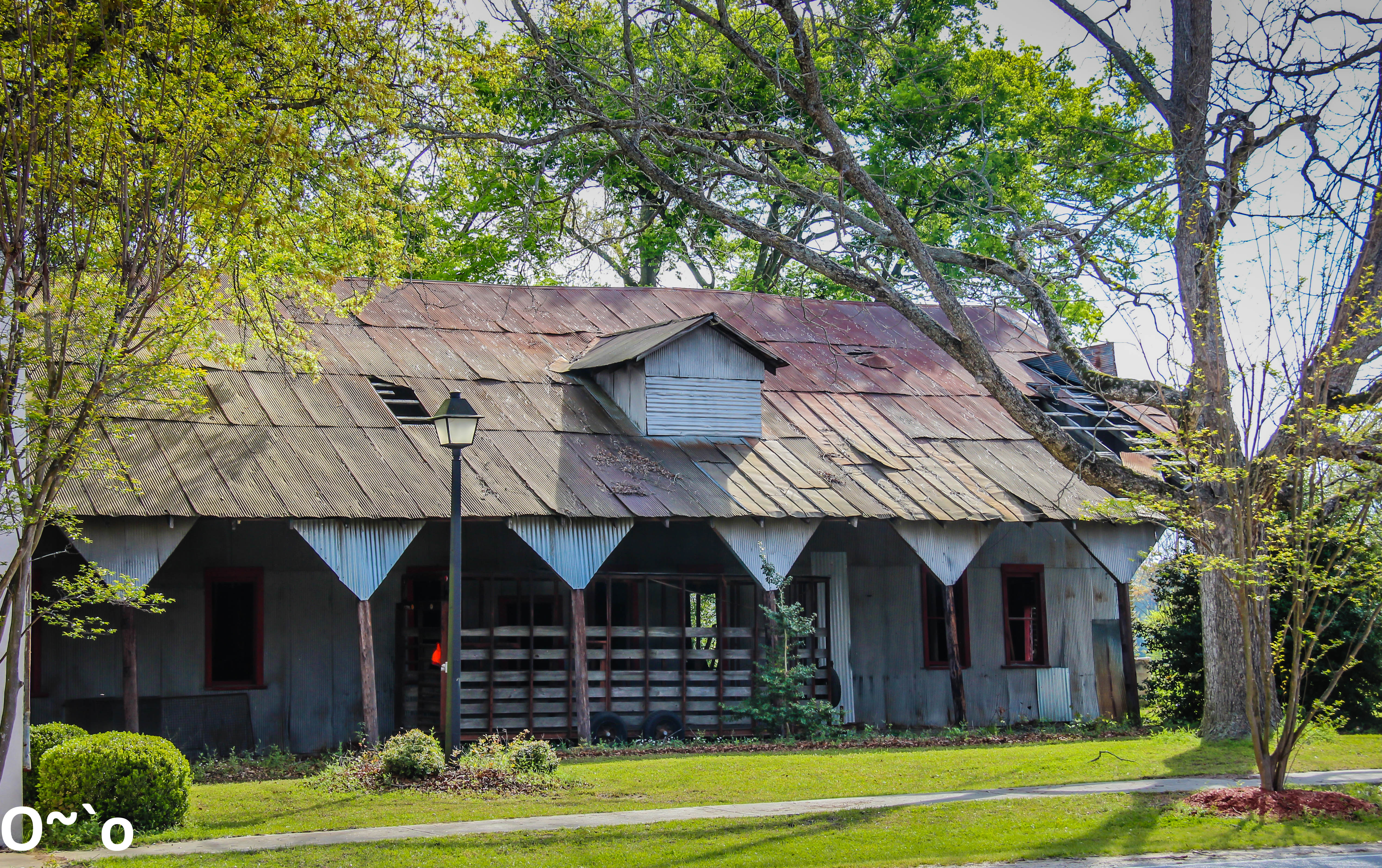
Old Cotton Gin
