= Parzival Copes =

Canadian economist (1924–2017)

- Born: January 22, 1924; Nakusp, British Columbia
- Died: September 8, 2017 (aged 93); Victoria, British Columbia

Academic background
- Education: University of British Columbia; London School of Economics
- Awards: Order of Canada

Parzival Copes, OC (22 January 1924 – 8 September 2017) was a Canadian economist with a particular interest in regional science and specialization in fisheries economics and management.

Born in Nakusp, British Columbia, he moved with his family to the Netherlands in 1933 and was educated at Vierde Vijfjarige H.B.S. in Amsterdam from 1936 to 1941. In 1942, he became active in 'underground' activities against the German occupation and in 1944 joined a Dutch resistance army unit. Later that year, he was arrested and spent time in prison and a penal labour camp Erika at Ommen. In April 1945, he escaped from a prison convoy and met up with the advancing Canadian Army, where he was employed in uniform as an interpreter.

After spending a year with the British military government in Germany, he returned to Canada, and enrolled at the University of British Columbia, where he also joined the Canadian Officers Training Corps in 1946. In 1949, he obtained a Commission. In the reserves, he served as Intelligence Officer with the Cameron Highlanders of Ottawa and later as Commanding Officer (rank of Major) of 112 Manning Depot in St. John's. He was awarded a Canadian Forces' Decoration in 1963.

He received a Bachelor of Arts degree in economics and political science in 1949 and a Master of Arts degree in economics in 1950 from the University of British Columbia. He earned his Ph.D. in economics in 1956 from the London School of Economics. He has been awarded honorary doctorates by Royal Roads Military College in Victoria, by the University of Tromsø in Norway and by the Memorial University of Newfoundland.

From 1953 to 1957, he was an economist and statistician with the Dominion Bureau of Statistics in Ottawa, where he was placed in charge of the Canadian Sickness Survey unit. In 1957, he was appointed associate professor—and subsequently professor—at the Memorial University of Newfoundland and Head of the Department of Economics. In 1961, he proposed and helped create Memorial's Institute of Social and Economic Research and was its first director of economic research.

In 1964, he was appointed professor in the Department of Economics and Commerce at Simon Fraser University, serving as founding head of the department until 1969 and as chairman from 1972 to 1975. In 1968, he introduced Canada's first Executive MBA program. He organized the Centre for Canadian Studies, serving as director from 1978 to 1985. From 1980 to 1994 he was founding Director of the Institute of Fisheries Analysis. In 1991, he was appointed emeritus Professor.

He has served as president of the Canadian Regional Science Association, the Western Regional Science Association and the Pacific Regional Science Conference Organization, and as vice-president of the Social Science Federation of Canada and the Canadian Economics Association.

In 1992 he was named a Foreign Fellow of the Russian Academy of Natural Sciences. He was the first recipient of the Sterling Prize in Support of Controversy in 1994 and received the Distinguished Service Award of the International Institute of Fisheries Economics and Trade in 1996. In 2005, he was made an Officer of the Order of Canada.
