= Coping (disambiguation) =

Coping is the process of managing stressful circumstances.

Coping may also refer to:

- Coping (architecture), consists of the capping or covering of a wall
- Coping (joinery), a woodworking or a woodworking

technique

- Coping, the part of a crown that contacts the prepared tooth
- "Coping", a song from Blur's 1993 album Modern Life Is Rubbish

== See also ==
- Cope (disambiguation)
