= Cope (film) =

- Directed by: Ronald Jerry
- Written by: Ronald Jerry; Shiloh Pilot
- Produced by: Dave Jackson; Ronald Jerry; Robert Allen Wagner
- Starring: Rachel Pinto; Robert Allen Wagner; Krystal Sullivan; David Weinand
- Edited by: Ronald Jerry
- Music by: Andrew Nickerson
- Production company: Kitty Productions
- Distributed by: Brain Damage Films; Pendulum Pictures
- Release date: January 23, 2007
- Running time: 90 minutes
- Country: United States
- Language: English

Cope is a 2007 psychological thriller/horror independent film written and directed by Ronald Jerry and produced by Kitty Productions, a multimedia company based in Kodiak, Alaska.

== Plot ==
The film is a psychological suspense drama that centers on one family from Kodiak, Alaska. The town’s citizens disappear during the night mysteriously. Mickey Allen is alive to find out what happened to them. Another single survivor offers mysterious clues. Meanwhile, his sister Lauren is trapped in a pure white cell and is forced to do her own searching of the past.

== Cast ==
- Rachel Pinto
- Robert Allen Wagner
- Krystal Sullivan
- David Weinand
- Stacey Becklund
- Orion Crockett
- Ry Pengilly
- Tammi Solorio
- Amy Steinbach
- Pat Maloney
- Thomas Kinsley
- Patrick Keegan
- Dakota Nelson
- Anita Steinbach

== Reception ==
Ben Platt of Something Awful panned the film while simultaneously panning the distributor, noting that "they were only able to force this film on the public with a hearty dose of lies." Similarly, Wild Realm Reviews called it amateurish and incoherent nonsense, noting "Labeled as a 'psychological thriller,' there's nothing of the psychological or the thrilling about it. It's merely a photographed mess devoid of characterization or plot." The film was also referred to as a “hellish mess with no understandable plot in sight” and was also described as “a movie that has a plot, but doesn’t invest people enough to the point of where they would care, a gigantic pile of sh*t”
