= Copes Bay =

Bay in Nunavut, Canada

- Location within Nunavut
- Location: Nares Strait
- Coordinates: 79°25′0″N 76°30′0″W
- Ocean/sea sources: Arctic Ocean
- Basin countries: Canada
- Settlements: Uninhabited

Copes Bay is an Arctic waterway in the Qikiqtaaluk Region, Nunavut, Canada. It is located in Nares Strait by eastern Ellesmere Island, and marks the northern edge of Cook Peninsula.

== Exploration ==
English adventurer David Hempleman-Adams passed through Copes Bay during his solo trek to the Geomagnetic North Pole in 2003.
