= Galena (disambiguation) =

Galena is a mineral and an important lead ore.

Galena may also refer to:

== Places ==
=== Canada ===
- Galena Bay, a ferry terminal, community and bay, British Columbia
  - Galena Pass, a low mountain pass near Galena Bay
- Galena Island, an uninhabited island in Nunavut

=== United States ===
- Galena, Alaska, a city
- Galena, Idaho, a former mining town
- Galena, Illinois, a city and county seat
  - Galena Historic District
- Galena, Indiana, a census-designated place
- Galena, Kansas, a city
- Galena, Maryland, a town
- Galena, Missouri, a city
- Galena, Lander County, Nevada, a ghost town
- Galena, Washoe County, Nevada, a town abandoned after 1867
- Galena, Ohio, a village
- Galena, Oregon, a ghost town
- Galena, South Dakota, an unincorporated community
- Galena, Washington, an unincorporated community
- Galena Peak, a mountain in Colorado
- Galena Peak (Idaho), a mountain in Idaho
- Galena River (Illinois)
- Galena River (Indiana)
- Galena Summit, a high mountain pass in central Idaho
- Galena Township (disambiguation)
- Lake Galena (Illinois), a reservoir
- Lake Galena (Pennsylvania), a reservoir

== Businesses ==
- Galena Biopharma, American pharmaceutical company
- Galena Hotel, originally known as the Fox River House, historic hotel in Aurora, Illinois, US
- Galena Lodge, cross-country skiing resort in Idaho, US
- Ivax Pharmaceuticals, a company previously known as "Galena"

== Military ==
- USS Galena, three U.S. Navy ships
- Galena class, a U.S. Navy class of 19th century sloops of war

== People ==
- Galena (singer) (born 1985), Bulgarian pop folk singer
- Ayelet Galena (2009–2012), child born with the rare genetic disorder dyskeratosis congenita

== Science ==
- Galena Group, a sedimentary sequence of Ordovician limestone that was deposited atop the Decorah Shale
- Galena, a cultivar of hops

== Other uses ==
- Galena High School (disambiguation)
- Galena Nuclear Power Plant, a former proposed nuclear power plant in Galena, Alaska, US

== See also ==
- Galena River (disambiguation)
- Galene (disambiguation)
- Galina (disambiguation)
- Garena, video game developer
