= Gallina (disambiguation) =

The Gallina culture was set in the American Southwest from approximately 1050 to 1300.

Gallina may also refer to:

- Gallina (surname), a surname and list of name-holders

== Places ==
- Gallina, Castiglione d'Orcia, a village in Italy
- Gallina, New Mexico, a census-designated place in the United States
- Gallina, Texas, former name of Candelaria, Texas, an unincorporated community in the United States
- Pizzo Gallina, a mountain in Switzerland
- Villa Gallina, a historic house in Fredensborg, Denmark

== Other uses ==
- Gallina, input language for Rocq (formerly named Coq) proof assistant

== See also ==
- Galina (disambiguation)
- Galena (disambiguation)
