= Hayden pass =

Hayden pass may refer to several places:

- Hayden Pass (Colorado)
  - Hayden Pass Fire, a 2016 wildfire
- Hayden Mountain Summit (Oregon)
