= Sidmouth (disambiguation) =

Sidmouth may refer to:

- Sidmouth, coastal town in Devon, England
  - Sidmouth Folk Festival
  - Sidmouth railway station
- Sidmouth, British Columbia, former railway point in Canada
- Sidmouth, Tasmania, locality in Australia
- Sidmouth Rock (Tasmania)
- Viscount Sidmouth, title in the Peerage of the United Kingdom
  - Henry Addington, 1st Viscount Sidmouth (1759-1844)
