= Twelve Mile, Revelstoke Reach, British Columbia =

Twelve Mile
- Location of Twelve Mile in British Columbia
- Coordinates: 50°50′58″N 118°05′42″W
- Country: Canada
- Province: British Columbia
- Region: West Kootenay
- Regional District: Columbia-Shuswap
- Area codes: 250, 778, 236, & 672
- Highways: Highway 23

Twelve Mile was a railway point in the West Kootenay region of southeastern British Columbia. The scattered community straddled the shores of the Columbia River. The locality, off BC Highway 23, is by road about 24 kilometres (15 mi) southeast of Revelstoke.

== Early community ==
The first wave of arrivals occurred in the 1890s, primarily to log their properties. Once their timber was depleted, the people mostly moved on, but a few stayed. The next wave, who were mostly from central Europe, began around 1920 and became permanent settlers. This included the Hulyd, Iwasiuk, Kozek, Mazar, Miller, Petrashuk, and Thompson families.

The community numbered about 20 households. The nearest post office, which was about 7 kilometres (4 mi) to the north at Mount Cartier, operated 1928–1966. No general stores existed.

When established in 1930, school was held for several months in a log shack then residence, until the schoolhouse was completed. Completely rebuilt after burning down in 1935, enlarged in 1948, the final replacement was a modern modular structure in 1956. The former building became the community hall. When the school closed in 1967, the building was relocated. The various names were Twelve Mile Ferry School, Twelve Mile School, and Twelve Mile South School.

The June 1948 floods devastated the general area.

In 1966, clearing began for the Keenleyside Dam reservoir. Buildings were either moved, demolished, or burned. The fairness of compensation was questioned by residents.

== Railway ==
The southward advance of the Canadian Pacific Railway (CP) rail head reached Greenslide in November 1893. After the spring thaw, the Revelstoke–Nakusp steamboat called here to provide a connection southward. Significant reconstruction followed the catastrophic June 1894 flood. The rail head was 10 kilometres (6 mi) south of Greenslide. At 6 kilometres (4 mi) south, an explosives accident critically injured two railway construction workers. The Revelstoke–Arrowhead railway line was completed in late 1895, becoming fully operational from early 1896.

In 1905, two cars of a southbound passenger train derailed near Greenslide. In 1913, a man, who appeared to have missed his stop, jumped from a moving southbound train immediately north of Greenslide. Falling onto a snowbank, he rolled back under the passenger car wheels and sustained fatal injuries.

The unofficial 12-Mile flag stop existed by the early 1920s just north of the Miller farm.

A small unstaffed shed-like station and siding existed.

In 1931, a twice weekly mixed train replaced the daily passenger one.

In 1954, CP abandoned its final route upon the Arrow Lakes. In 1955–56, the twice weekly Revelstoke–Arrowhead mixed train ended. In 1964, the final scheduled freight train ran. In May 1965, an excursion train was the final passenger run. In October 1968, the final commercial freight run occurred before the track was lifted.

Train Timetables (Regular stop or Flag stop)
	Mile	1905	1909	1912	1916	1919	c.1922	1929	1932	1935	1939	1943	1948	1953	1955	1956
Revelstoke	0.0	Regular	Regular	Regular	Regular	Regular	Regular	Regular	Regular	Regular	Regular	Regular	Regular	Regular	Regular	
Greenslide	9.8		Flag	Flag	Flag	Flag	Flag	Flag	Flag	Flag	Flag	Flag	Flag	Flag	Flag	
Wigwam	17.0	Flag	Flag	Flag	Flag	Flag	Flag	Flag	Flag	Flag	Flag	Flag	Flag	Flag	Flag	
Sidmouth	24.1						Flag	Regular	Regular	Regular	Regular	Regular	Regular	Regular	Regular	
Arrowhead	27.5	Regular	Regular	Regular	Regular	Regular	Regular	Regular	Regular	Regular	Regular	Regular	Regular	Regular	Regular	

== Ferry ==
In 1923, the surplus small wooden reaction ferry from 24 mile was installed. The west dock was just south of Mulvehill Creek and the east one was around a bend south from Drimmie Creek (formerly called Twelvemile Creek). The toll-free service was initially only during the daytime. Eventually, a house was built on the east shore for the operator. Mulvehill Creek and Mulvehill Falls honour Ed Mulvehill, the inaugural ferry operator. In 1924, a new scow was installed to handle the increased traffic.

In 1930, the scow was replaced and auxiliary power added. In 1932, a charge was introduced for nighttime, Sunday, and holiday service. When the cable broke during high water that year, the ferry rushed 3 kilometres (2 mi) downstream. After sustaining damage, new foundations and towers were built in 1933–34. In October 1934, when the ferry was across the river, a vehicle drove off the opposite landing in foggy conditions. Three occupants swam to safety but one drowned. In 1948, a new 12-automobile capacity steel scow was fabricated and installed to replace the wooden ferry.

In 1954–55, the towers and western dock were reconstructed. In 1956–57, the eastern one followed. That winter, explosives kept a channel open through the ice. In 1957, an incoming ferry pushed a waiting truck off the ramp into the water.

In 1966, the blaze, which severely damaged the deckhouse and running gear, was one of the several occasions the ferry caught fire. In 1969, the Shelter Bay–Galena Bay ferry commencement ended the 12-Mile one. The surplus scow was relocated to Needles. The ferry house, which could not be removed in time to escape the rising reservoir, floated. The location would eventually be under 8 metres (25 ft) of water.

== Roads ==
In 1911, the road from Revelstoke was extended about 3 kilometres (2 mi) southward to Twelve Mile. In the early 1920s, the whole road was upgraded. In 1923, the road southward via the ferry connected with the one northward from Hall's Landing.

Proctor Stage, which ran a Vernon–Nakusp service linking with the Greyhound route from Nelson, commenced a daily return Revelstoke–Arrowhead service in 1933. Along the latter route, Johnny Cancelliere started a taxi-bus service in 1941, and Fred Waby introduced a three times weekly stage line in 1947. Rutherford Bus Line commenced a Revelstoke–Ferguson run via Arrowhead in 1952. By 1960, Austin Bailey provided this service. Assumedly, none of the aforementioned operations were sufficiently profitable to be long lasting.

In 1968, the rising reservoir submerged the area and roads. The next year, the new Revelstoke–Shelter Bay highway, which lies wholly on the west shore of the river, was completed. To build the route, Highways paid for 19 kilometres (12 mi) and BC Hydro for 27 kilometres (17 mi).

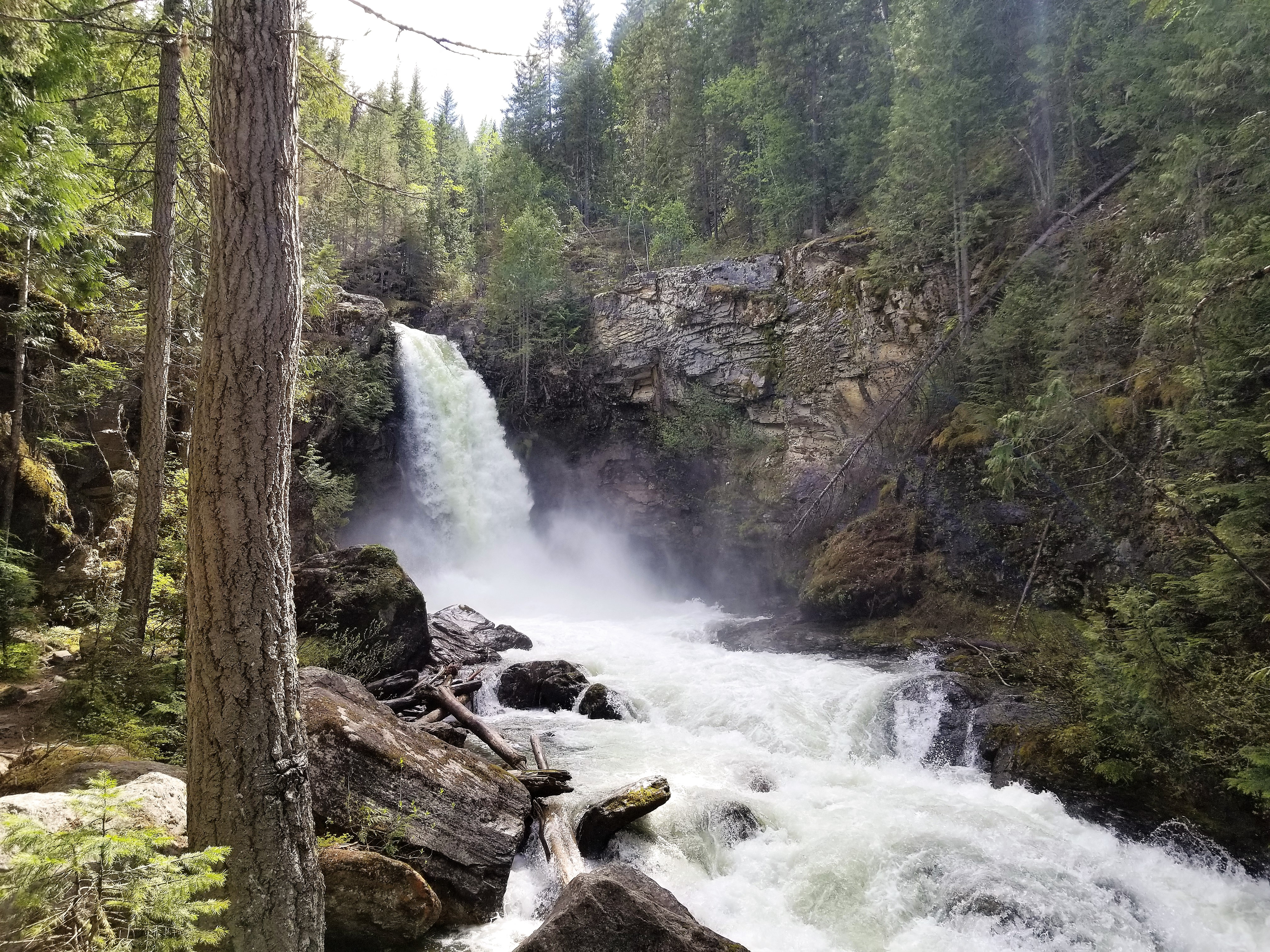
Sutherland Falls, Blanket Creek Provincial Park, BC, 2018.

== Later west shore ==
Blanket Creek Provincial Park was built atop the former Domke farm, which was near the southern boundary of the former community.

The Echo Bay-Mulvehill Creek Recreation Site offers outdoor climbing.

In 2021, the 16-hectare (39-acre) Mulvehill Creek Wilderness Inn and Wedding Chapel lakefront resort, with 13 rooms and a private helipad, sold for $2 million. That year, the new owners applied to rezone the use to a residential community including 70 new small single-family dwellings, 10 new tourist cabins, and a restaurant.

== Maps ==
- "Perry's mining map". wwwdavidrumsey.com. 1893.
- "Official motorist's guide of British Columbia". library.ubc.ca. 1931. p. 44.
- "Revelstoke area map". bcrdh.ca. 1965.
