= Galina (disambiguation) =

Galina is a given name.

Galina may also refer to:

- Galina (river), a river in Austria
- Galina, Perm Krai, a village in Russia
- 3576 Galina, an asteroid
- Galina Lighthouse, a lighthouse in Jamaica

== Persons with surname ==
- Stacy Galina (born 1966), American actress
- Roberto Vega Galina, Mexican physician and labour leader

== See also ==
- Galena (disambiguation)
- Gallina
