= Galene =

Galene may refer to:

== Science and technology ==
- 427 Galene, a main belt asteroid
- Galene (crab), a genus of crabs
- Galene, a genus of algae
- Galene (software) or Galène, videoconference software

== Other uses ==
- Galene (mythology), several characters

== See also ==
- Galeana (disambiguation)
- Galen (disambiguation)
- Galena (disambiguation)
- Galina, a given name
