= Sidmouth, British Columbia =

Sidmouth
- Location of Sidmouth in British Columbia
- Coordinates: 50°42′56″N 117°57′51″W
- Country: Canada
- Province: British Columbia
- Region: West Kootenay
- Regional District: Columbia-Shuswap
- Area codes: 250, 778, 236, & 672
- Highways: Highway 23

Sidmouth or Twenty-Four Mile was a railway point in the West Kootenay region of southeastern British Columbia. The scattered community straddled the shores of the Columbia River immediately south of the mouth of Cranberry Creek. The locality, off BC Highway 23, is by road about 43 kilometres (27 mi) southeast of Revelstoke.

== Community ==
On the west shore of the river at what would become known as Hall's Landing, John Hall, his daughter and three sons, settled in 1890. Edward Adair and William Vickers arrived in 1891. Adair was the first rancher, the Hall family taking up ranching in 1892. By that year, Hall's Landing, which the Revelstoke–Nakusp steamboat served, comprised two or three small houses. Sons Noah and Dave Hall remained permanent residents, developing their farms, which launched beef cattle as the staple among the other large surrounding farms.

The location was the terminus for the winter sleigh road from Revelstoke. In 1894, Andy Cummings established a restaurant and hotel, and Jason and Jessie Moxley enlarged their hotel. Only one building remained on its foundation after the catastrophic June flood that year. The annual flooding both stirred up fear and enriched the soil, which created the best farmland in the district. The Revelstoke–Arrowhead railway line was completed in late 1895, becoming fully operational from early 1896, and Hall's Landing ceased to be a winter transit point.

In 1903, about 2.6 kilometres (1.6 mi) north, a southbound passenger train struck a landslide, derailed, and rolled down an embankment. The fireman was badly scalded. By that year, flooding and the abysmal state of the roads and creek bridges had prompted most of the early farmers to abandon their Hall's Landing properties. In 1907, Violet Wagstaff was the inaugural teacher at the school. In 1912, having four children to bring up the numbers was a factor in Richard Girling securing the teaching position at the one room log building erected that year. In 1915, the building was upgraded or replaced.

In 1914, the Crawford Creek school opened about 4 kilometres (2.5 mi) north of the east bank ferry landing. Children this far north on the west shore would row across the river to attend the one-room log structure. In 1918-19, the Sproat school opened a few miles north. However, the settlement of Sproat, which was founded in 1910, was across the river, about 3.4 kilometres (2.1 mi) north of the eastern ferry dock and south of Crawford Creek. A post office existed 1916–1919. The location of this school may have changed over time, since it appears to be about 7 kilometres (4 mi) north during the 1930s, far closer to Wigwam, across the river to its north.

Escaping natural gas was first detected on the Hall acreage in 1908. Drilling for oil was carried out in 1922. No viable oil or gas fields resulted.

Around 1921, the Sidmouth train station opened immediately north of the east bank ferry landing, although an unofficial flag stop appears to have existed for at least five years, as did one at 21 Mile. The Canadian Pacific Railway (CP) sought a unique name for the station. However, "Hall" frequently appeared within station names on the network. When slips of paper containing alternatives were dropped into a hat, "Sidmouth" was the name drawn out.

Whereas R. Armstrong specified his address as Crawford Creek in 1915, by 1921, he used Sidmouth instead. For vital statistics purposes, Hall's Landing was not listed after 1930. Sidmouth became the address for all local residents. Opening on the western shore, the Sidmouth post office existed 1927–1966. Across the river in Sidmouth east, a small community hall stood, and a small general store operated 1928–1948. In 1928, a gasoline pump was installed on the west shore of the 24-Mile ferry to serve the increasing vehicular traffic.

The east side of the river never progressed beyond subsistence farming. Lawrence Boutillier ran a small sawmill at Crawford Creek 1924–1933. In 1929, the Crawford Creek school closed but reopened in 1937. The building was a small log structure, with a well and two outhouses nearby.

In 1940, CP installed a spur into the Columbia River timber pole yard at Sidmouth. In 1945, the three schools closed, and a school bus took the children to Arrowhead. In 1948, a general store opened on the west shore. After a while its Shell pump became the only pump between Revelstoke and Nakusp. That June, the extreme flooding temporarily submerged farms.

In 1952, the Celgar Corp. bought the seasonal Columbia River sawmill at Sidmouth. The next year, a new community hall was built on the west shore. In 1954, the mill closed. The next year, the church building was completed on the west shore.

By 1961, only 15 households remained in the area. That year, Mrs. Violet Hall (widow of Noah) voiced her frustration that the proposed dam would put their home and years of hard work under 9 metres (30 ft) of water. Over the following years, the trees and buildings that were removed were largely torched. The fairness of compensation was questioned by residents. In 1968, the rising reservoir for the Keenleyside Dam permanently ended the community.

== Roads ==
By 1899, the north–south road on the west shore stretched 10 kilometres (6 mi). By 1902, the local roads extended 6 kilometres (4 mi) through the community, which enabled 10 farmers to transport their produce to the shore.

By 1914, roading comprised 11 kilometres (7 mi) northward and 8 kilometres (5 mi) locally. In 1920, the eastern ferry dock was connected to Arrowhead by a winding road along the rock bluffs, unlike the straight train track along the shore.

In 1923/24, the 12-Mile ferry was installed and the road southward from Revelstoke connected with the one northward from Hall's Landing.

In 1968, the rising reservoir submerged the area and roads. The next year, the new Revelstoke–Shelter Bay highway, which lies wholly on the west shore of the river, was completed. Only a western stub of the Sidmouth Road connects to the highway.

== Ferry ==
Rowboats would have been used initially. In 1903, the Hall brothers built a small steamboat, the first of a series they owned, which plied the northern part of the lake. In 1912, the government toll-free cross river ferry was established, but this was initially a rowboat. In 1914, a new wharf was built at Hall's Landing primarily to handle shipments to Arrowhead. In 1917 a scow was installed, which was guided by cables.

In 1923, a six-vehicle capacity reaction ferry, with an auxiliary gasoline engine, was built to replace the hand powered one.

In 1932, a charge was introduced for nighttime, Sunday, and holiday service. In the 1934–35 winter, the old barge which had become unsafe was replaced. In the 1937–38 new towers, foundations, anchor blocks and overhead cable were installed. In January 1950, the ferry sank after being punctured by ice. In 1950–51, a surplus steel barge (1949) was relocated from Arrow Park.

In 1966–67, the east dock, which had been damaged by high water, was rebuilt. Reduced current from the rising reservoir caused the channel to prematurely freeze over. Consequently, in January 1969, the Shelter Bay–Galena Bay ferry commencement ended the 24-Mile one.

== Maps ==
- "Perry's mining map". wwwdavidrumsey.com. 1893.
- "Official motorist's guide of British Columbia". library.ubc.ca. 1931. p. 44.
