= Galena Peak =

Mountain in the state of Colorado

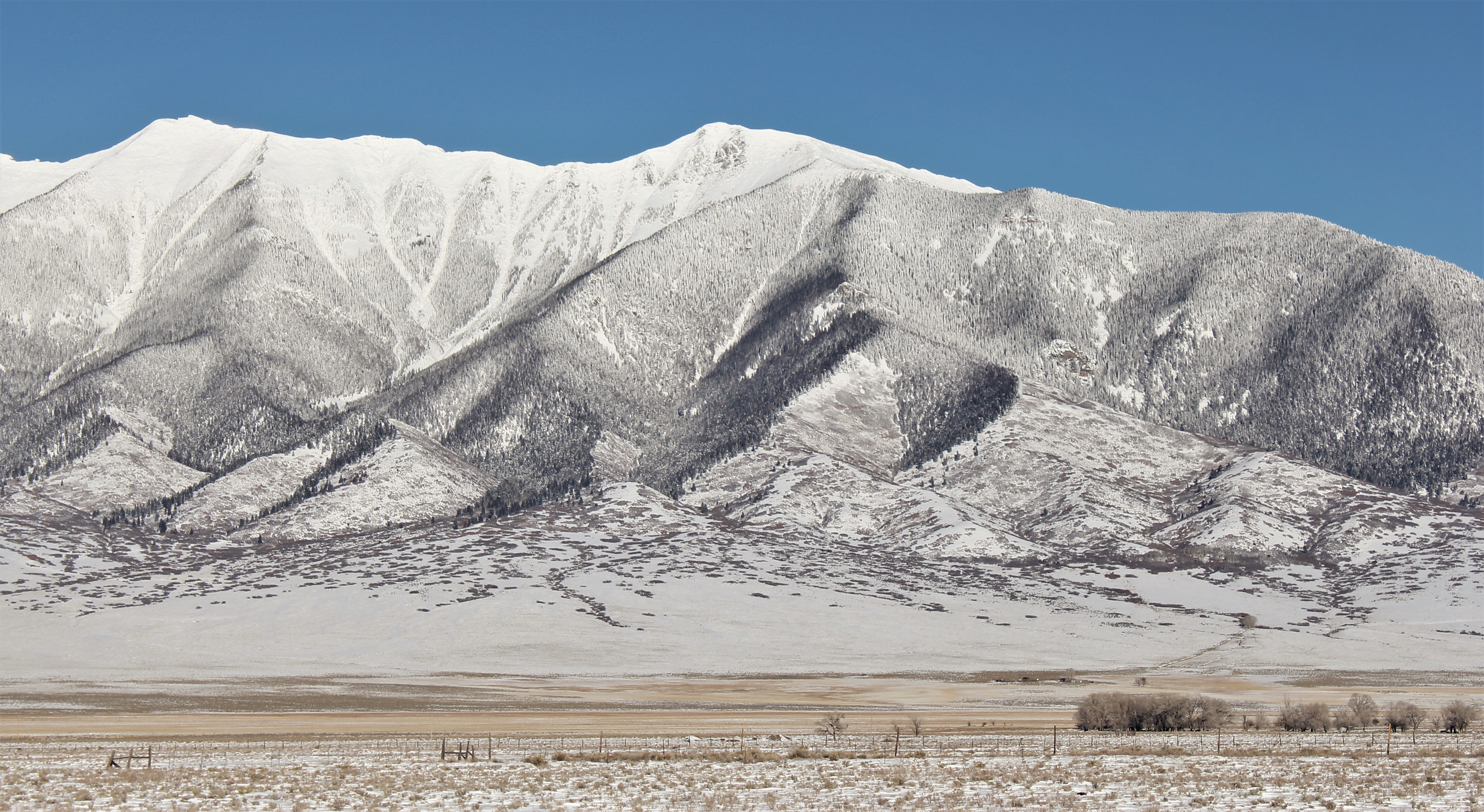
- West-southwest aspect, from Highway 285

Highest point
- Elevation: 12,461 ft (3,798 m)
- Prominence: 361 ft (110 m)
- Parent peak: Bushnell Peak (13,110 ft)
- Isolation: 0.84 mi (1.35 km)
- Coordinates: 38°18′31″N 105°52′08″W

Naming
- Etymology: Galena

Geography
- Location within Colorado Location within the United States
- Country: United States
- State: Colorado
- County: Fremont County / Saguache County
- Protected area: Sangre de Cristo Wilderness
- Parent range: Rocky Mountains; Sangre de Cristo Range
- Topo map: USGS Coaldale

Geology
- Mountain type: Fault block
- Rock type: Metamorphic rock

Climbing
- Easiest route: class 2 hiking

Galena Peak is a 12,461-foot (3,798 m) mountain summit on the boundary shared by Fremont County and Saguache County, in Colorado, United States.

== Description ==
Galena Peak is set on the east side of the San Luis Valley, on the crest of the Sangre de Cristo Range which is a subrange of the Rocky Mountains. It is the sixth-highest summit in Fremont County and can be seen from Highway 285 near the community of Villa Grove. The mountain is located in the Sangre de Cristo Wilderness, on land managed by San Isabel National Forest and Rio Grande National Forest. Precipitation runoff from the mountain's west slope drains to San Luis Creek and the east slope drains to the Arkansas River via Hayden Creek. Topographic relief is significant as the summit rises 3,860 feet (1,177 m) above the San Luis Valley in two miles (3.2 km). An ascent of the peak from Hayden Pass involves hiking seven miles (11 km) with approximately 1,800 feet (549 m) of elevation gain. The mountain's toponym has been officially adopted by the United States Board on Geographic Names.

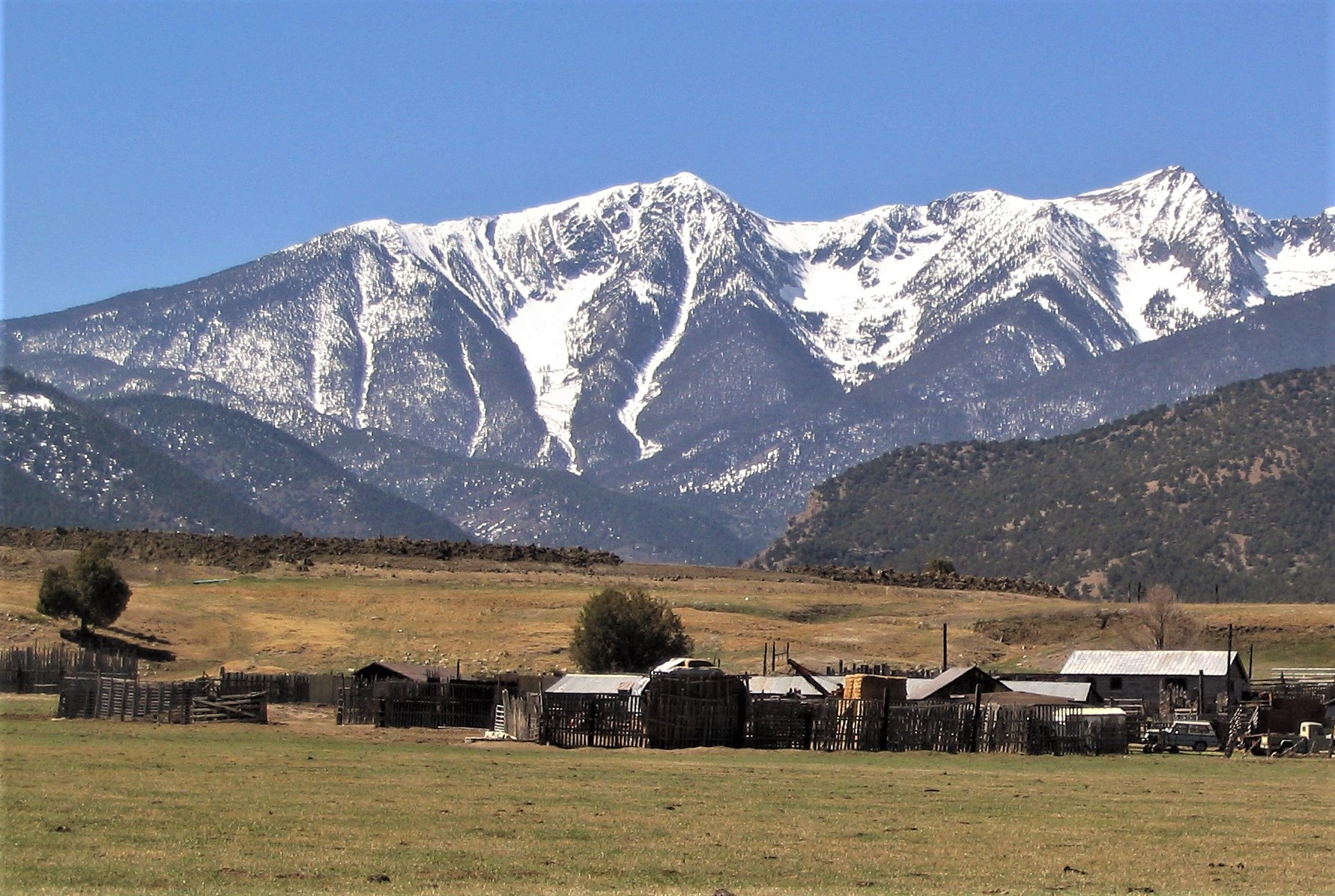
Northeast aspect of Galena Peak centered, view from near Coaldale, Colorado

== Climate ==
According to the Köppen climate classification system, Galena Peak is located in an alpine subarctic climate zone with cold, snowy winters, and cool to warm summers. Due to its altitude, it receives precipitation all year, as snow in winter, and as thunderstorms in summer, with a dry period in late spring.

== See also ==
- Sangre de Cristo Mountains
