= Galina (river) =

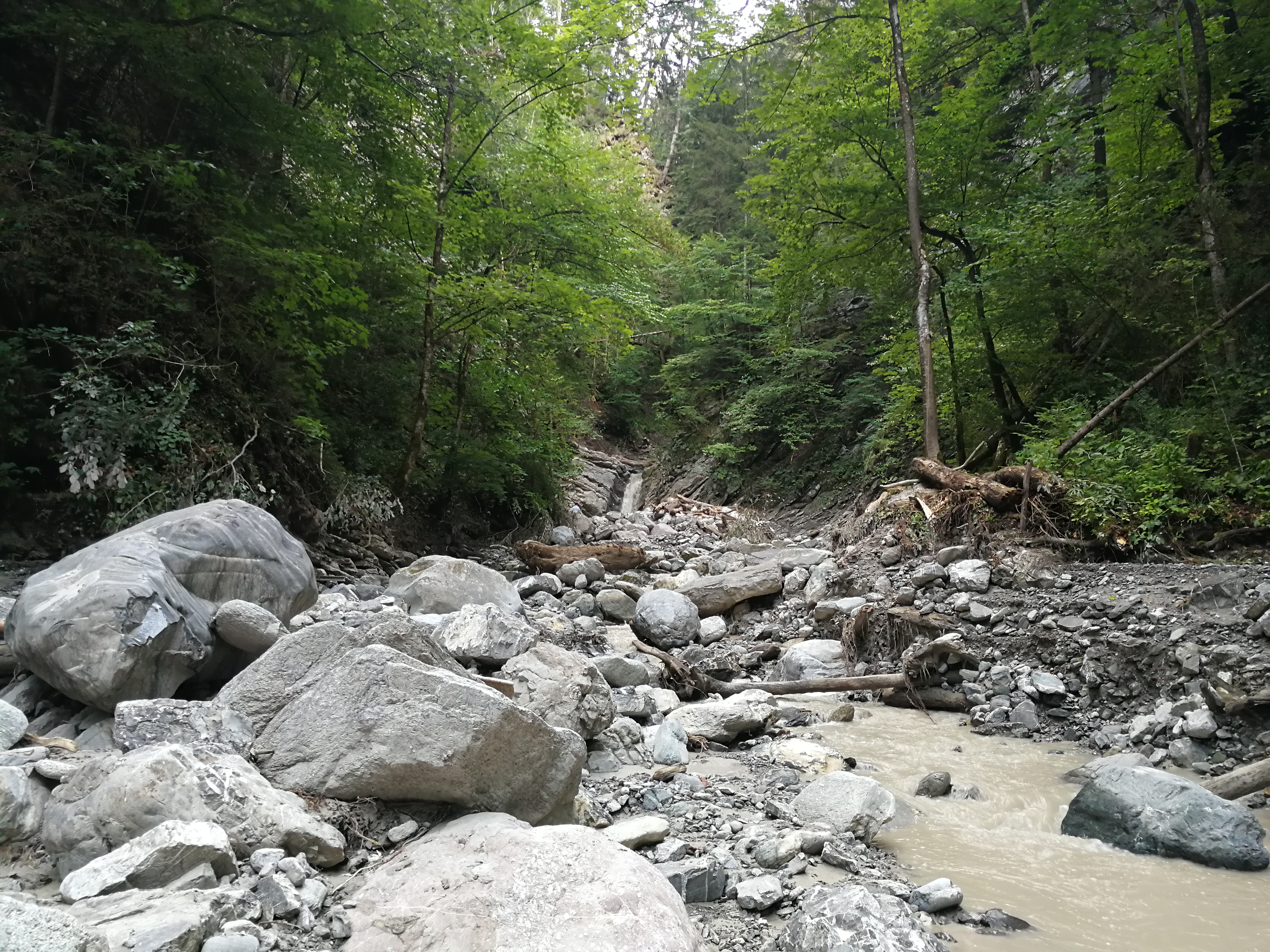

Location
- Country: Austria
- State: Vorarlberg

Physical characteristics
- Source
  - location: northeast of the Galinakopf
  - coordinates: 47.1608°N 9.6393°E
  - elevation: 2,060 m (6,760 ft)
- Mouth
  - location: into the Ill between Frastanz and Feldkirch
  - coordinates: 47.2085°N 9.6662°E
- Length: ~ 5.80 km (3.60 mi)

Basin features
- Progression: Ill→ Rhine→ North Sea

The Galina is a river of Vorarlberg, Austria.

The Galina originates near the northeast of the Galinakopf summit, near the Rossboden, 2,060 metres (6,760 ft) above sea level. With a length of about 5.80 km (3.60 mi) it is one of the shortest rivers of Vorarlberg. It flows into the Ill between Frastanz and Feldkirch.
