= Galena River =

Galena River may refer to

- Galena River (Illinois), tributary of the Mississippi River in northwest Illinois
- Galena River (Indiana), in northern Indiana, becoming the South Branch Galien River in Michigan

== See also ==
- Galena (disambiguation)
