= Shelter Bay, British Columbia =

Shelter Bay
- Location of Shelter Bay in British Columbia
- Coordinates: 50°38′00″N 117°56′00″W
- Country: Canada
- Province: British Columbia
- Area code: 250 / 778 / 236
- Highways: Highway 23

Shelter Bay is a ferry landing and unincorporated locality on Upper Arrow Lake in British Columbia, Canada.

It serves as one terminus of the Upper Arrow Lake Ferry, that crosses the lake to Galena Bay. This ferry connects British Columbia Highway 23 from Revelstoke to that highway's continuation from Galena Bay to Nakusp along the east shore of Upper Arrow Lake. It also provides a link to the start of British Columbia Highway 31 which runs from Galena Bay via Galena Pass to Lardeau on Kootenay Lake and hence down the west side of that lake to Balfour.

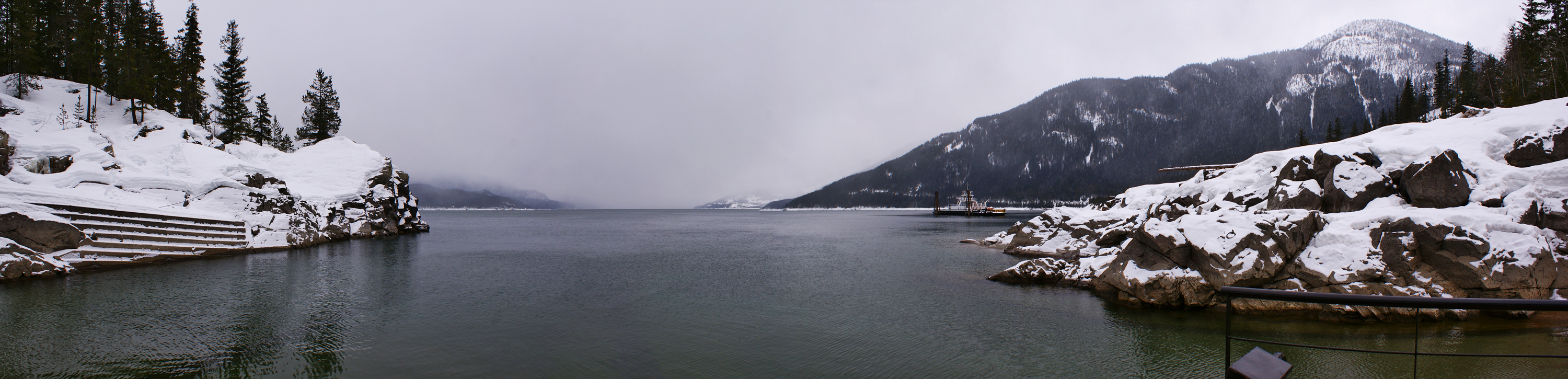
View from Shelter Bay with ferry used in the crossing on the right hand side.

== See also ==
- Shelter Bay, Washington
