= Gallina (surname) =

Gallina is a surname. Notable people with the surname include:

- Anna Gallina (born 1983), German politician
- Antonio Gallina (born 1947), Argentine judoka
- Ernesto Gallina (1924–2002), Italian Roman Catholic prelate
- Gerardo Lagunes Gallina (born 1975), Mexican politician
- Giada Gallina (born 1973), Italian sprinter
- Giovanni Gallina (1892–1963), Italian footballer
- Mario Gallina (1889–1950), Italian actor
- Paolo Gallina, Canadian politician
- Pedro Gallina (1949–2022), Argentine footballer
- Roberto Gallina (born 1940), Italian Grand Prix motorcycle road racer and racing team owner
