= Galena Peak (Idaho) =

Mountain in Idaho, United States

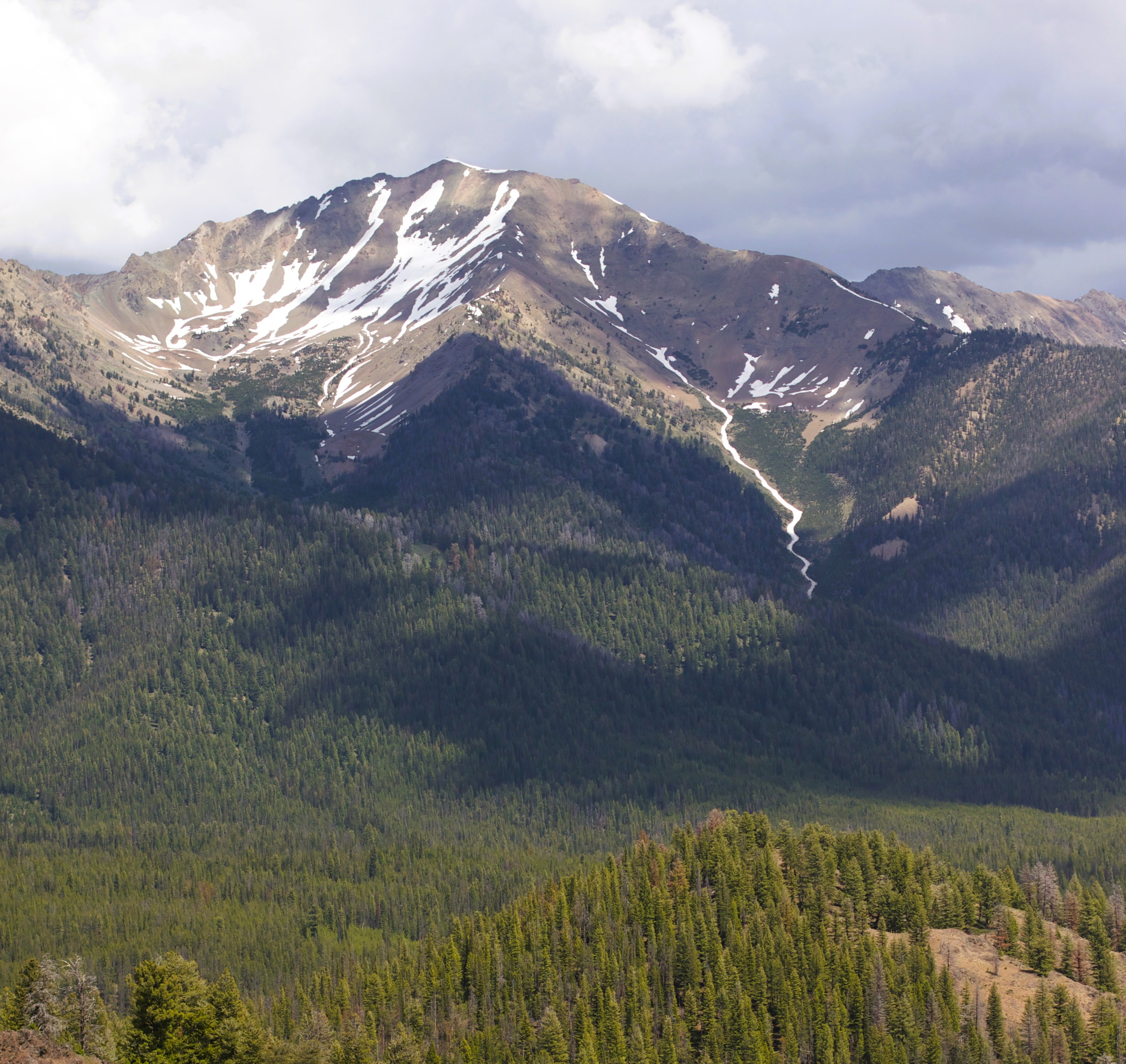
- West aspect

Highest point
- Elevation: 11,167 ft (3,404 m)
- Prominence: 742 ft (226 m)
- Parent peak: Cerro Ciento (11,177 ft)
- Isolation: 2.09 mi (3.36 km)
- Coordinates: 43°53′22″N 114°36′15″W

Naming
- Etymology: Galena

Geography
- Location within Idaho Location within the United States
- Country: United States
- State: Idaho
- County: Blaine / Custer
- Protected area: Hemingway–Boulders Wilderness
- Parent range: Boulder Mountains; Rocky Mountains
- Topo map: USGS Galena Peak

Geology
- Rock type(s): Sedimentary rock, Volcanic rock

Climbing
- Easiest route: class 2

Silver Peak is an 11,167-foot-elevation (3,404 m) mountain summit in Idaho, United States.

== Description ==
Galena Peak ranks as the 94th-highest peak in Idaho, and it is part of the Boulder Mountains which are a subrange of the Rocky Mountains. The mountain is situated 18 miles (29 km) northwest of Ketchum, Idaho, on the common border shared by Blaine County and Custer County. It is set in the Hemingway–Boulders Wilderness on land managed by Sawtooth National Forest. The peak is a popular climb and is visible from Highway 75 at Galena Summit. Precipitation runoff from the mountain's west slope drains into tributaries of the Big Wood River, whereas the east slope drains into the South Fork of the East Fork Salmon River. Topographic relief is significant as the summit rises 3,800 feet (1,158 meters) above Big Wood River in 2.75 miles (4.43 km) and over 3,500 feet (1,067 meters) above South Fork in two miles (3.2 km). This mountain's toponym has been officially adopted by the United States Board on Geographic Names.

== Climate ==
Based on the Köppen climate classification, Galena Peak is located in an alpine subarctic climate zone with long, cold, snowy winters, and cool to warm summers. Winter temperatures can drop below 0 °F with wind chill factors below −10 °F. Climbers can expect afternoon rain and lightning from summer thunderstorms.

== See also ==
- List of mountain peaks of Idaho
