= Galena Lodge =

Cross-country ski lodge in Idaho, USA

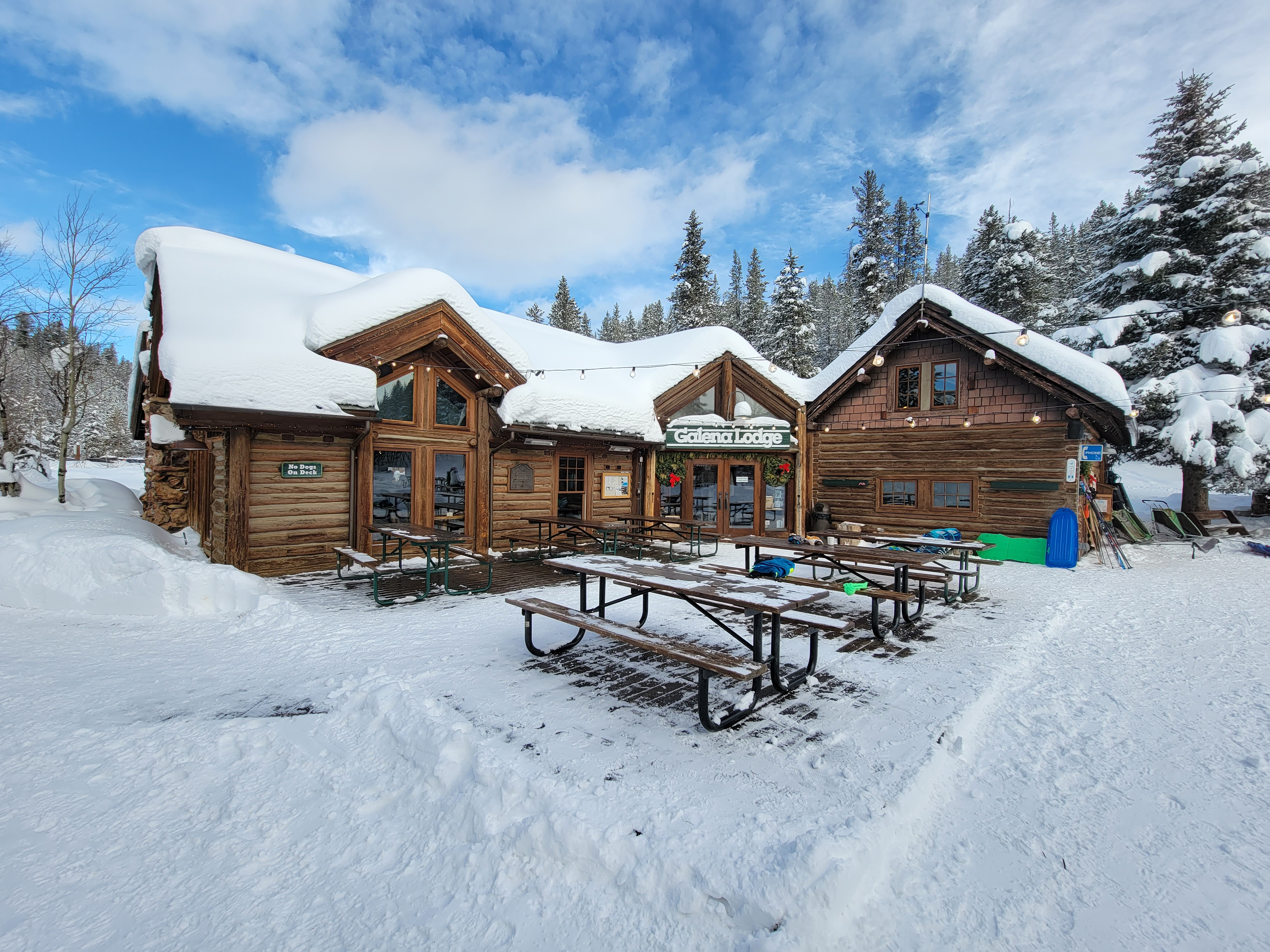
- The main building in 2021

- Location in the United States Location in Idaho
- Location: 15187 Highway 75, Ketchum; Sawtooth National Recreation Area; Blaine County, Idaho, U.S.
- Nearest city: Ketchum; 23 miles (37 km)
- Coordinates: 43.872°N 114.655°W
- Owner: Blaine County Recreation District
- Base elevation: 7,303 feet (2,226 m)
- Skiable area: 95.3 km (59.2 mi),
- Trails: 17
- Longest run: 5.5 km (3.4 mi); Jenny's Way
- Website: www.galenalodge.com

Galena Lodge is a Nordic skiing and mountain biking recreation area in the western United States, located in Blaine County, Idaho. Established in 1976 at the location of the former mining town of Galena (1876–1890), the lodge operation is based on a special-use permit from the U.S. Forest Service, the first one issued in the U.S. for a Nordic ski resort. With almost one hundred miles (160 km) of trails for skiing and snowshoeing, the Ketchum / Sun Valley Nordic system is among the largest in North America.

Just below milepost 152 on State Highway 75, the approximate elevation of the lodge is 7,300 feet (2,225 m) above sea level. Down the highway, Ketchum is 23 miles (37 km) away; up the highway six miles (10 km) is Galena Summit at 8,701 feet (2,652 m).

== Trails ==
The first marked ski trails in the area appeared in the winter of 1974–1975, after a gentlemen's agreement was reached in 1973 to avoid conflicts between the snowmobile users and skiers by leaving the upper end of the Wood River Valley for an exclusive use of the skiers. By 1980, the trail network grew to 40 km (25 mi) of groomed trails. A 30 km (19 mi) trail from Galena Lodge to North Fork Campground was fully cleared by the 1979, but at the time was only groomed before the Boulder Mountain Marathon Race; the construction of what is now known as a Harriman trail was completed in 2001. Work on the 47-mile (76 km) summer trail system started in 2014.

Dogs are permitted on all trails, and season or day trail passes are required.

== History ==
=== Mining town ===
The mining town of Galena was established in 1879 (this allows it to claim the title of the earliest town in the Wood River Valley). Located close to few mines, including the Gladiator and Senate ones, at its heyday the town, with its population of 800, had its own post office, hotel, general store, multiple restaurants and saloons, a livery stable, a stage stable for a stage line to Hailey, and even a shoe shop. The industry consisted of a 30-ton smelter on a Senator Creek that did not produce much bullion.

The history of the mining town was brief: the last resident left in 1890, and Galena became a "ghost town". A small store survived for many more years, operating in the summertime. The swift demise was caused by the bad state of the mining business around: the mines turned out to be not as rich as they were expected to be, and an anticipated switch away from the silver standard forced the prices of silver to plummet in 1888.

The town got its name from galena, an important lead ore (lead(II) sulfide); deposits of galena often contain silver.

=== Store ===
Charles and Pearl Barber came to the area for fishing and ended up purchasing the store in 1923 for $500 (with just $50 down). The land belonged to the US Federal government that demanded from them to either fix or demolish the town buildings, as a result old Galena was erased from existence. With the development of the Sun Valley resort nearby, Barbers decided to expand their business by building 17 guest cabins. The plans were approved in 1941, but Charles at the time suffered a stroke and died in 1944. Pearl continued to run the store business alone until 1960. After few changes of ownership, the place was purchased by the Gelsky family, who erected the Galena Lodge building.

=== Nordic resort ===
The area was popular among the local skiers since the Barbers set up the lodge in 1936. Due to its higher elevation, Galena has earlier and better snow than Sun Valley, so the resort management occasionally brought guests to Galena for downhill and cross-country skiing. Barbers even installed a rope tow lift in the 1940s that for a couple of years serviced the beginners. In 1976 the Gelsky family sold the lodge to a group of seven owners that tried to capitalize on the newfound US interest in Nordic skiing and advertised Galena Lodge as a cross-country ski resort. After a brief ownership by the Fuller family, Galena Lodge was acquired by Steve Haims who invested heavily into the lodge and the system of trails. The Boulder Mountain Tour, a world-class ski race, was established in 1973. Still, the remote location made visiting the resort hard and created problems with the supply of electricity (for a long time the lodge was forced to use its own generator, power line only arrived at the lodge in 2004).

=== BCRD acquisition ===
Unable to expand the business, Haims had hard time selling it. After 18 months of lodge standing empty, US Forest Service requested adherence to the permit that required 120 days of operation per year, and skiing community of Blaine County launched a donation drive in 1994 that yielded 500,000 dollars, amount sufficient for the Blaine County Recreation District (BCRD) to take over the building and the network of trails. $325,000, the entire original goal, were donated by Teresa Heinz in memory of her late husband, Senator John Heinz). Although BCRD is a tax-supported entity, a pledge was made at the time of no tax dollars going toward maintenance of the Galena Lodge, so the sustainability of the resort entirely depends on the use fees (65%, mostly from local skiers) and annual fundraisers.

== Climate ==
Climate data for Galena, Idaho, 1991–2020 normals: 7470ft (2277m)
Month	Jan	Feb	Mar	Apr	May	Jun	Jul	Aug	Sep	Oct	Nov	Dec	Year
Mean daily maximum °F (°C)	32.8 (0.4)	37.2 (2.9)	44.3 (6.8)	49.6 (9.8)	57.8 (14.3)	66.6 (19.2)	78.2 (25.7)	76.7 (24.8)	67.3 (19.6)	53.2 (11.8)	38.6 (3.7)	30.2 (−1.0)	52.7 (11.5)
Daily mean °F (°C)	20.6 (−6.3)	22.8 (−5.1)	29.0 (−1.7)	35.1 (1.7)	43.1 (6.2)	50.1 (10.1)	58.6 (14.8)	57.3 (14.1)	49.8 (9.9)	38.9 (3.8)	26.3 (−3.2)	18.8 (−7.3)	37.5 (3.1)
Mean daily minimum °F (°C)	8.4 (−13.1)	8.4 (−13.1)	13.6 (−10.2)	20.4 (−6.4)	28.2 (−2.1)	33.5 (0.8)	39.1 (3.9)	37.8 (3.2)	32.1 (0.1)	24.7 (−4.1)	14.0 (−10.0)	7.5 (−13.6)	22.3 (−5.4)
Average precipitation inches (mm)	3.41 (87)	2.92 (74)	2.85 (72)	1.98 (50)	2.19 (56)	1.94 (49)	0.74 (19)	0.63 (16)	1.23 (31)	1.84 (47)	2.75 (70)	4.40 (112)	26.88 (683)
Source 1: XMACIS2
Source 2: NOAA (Precipitation)

== Sources ==
- Hofferber, Michael (2019). The Unique History of Galena: Silver, Trout, & Trails (2nd ed.). Blaine County Recreation District.
- Walter, Claire (2008). "A Place Called Galena Lodge" (PDF). Snowshoe Magazine.
- Rowland, Frank L.; Britton, Kenneth A. (February 27–29, 1980). "Providing multiple experience levels for Nordic skiers within the Sawtooth National Recreation Area" (PDF). North American Symposium on Dispersed Winter Recreation. St. Paul, Minnesota: Office of Special Programs, University of Minnesota. pp. 110−113.
- Jensen, Peter (Nov 23, 2018). "The story of Galena Lodge continues to unfurl". The Idaho Mountain Express. Ketchum, Idaho: Express Pub. Co. Inc. ISSN 0279-8964. LCCN sn81000974. OCLC 7341817.
- Sparling, Wayne C. (1974). "Galena - site". Southern Idaho Ghost Towns. Caxton Press. p. 80. ISBN 978-0-87004-229-4. OCLC 124064806.
- Umpleby, Joseph B. (1914). Ore deposits in the Sawtooth quadrangle, Blaine and Custer Counties, Idaho (PDF). US Government Printing Office.
- Lundin, John W. (29 June 2020). Sun Valley, Ketchum, and the Wood River Valley. Arcadia Publishing. p. 147. ISBN 978-1-4396-7034-7. OCLC 1160570597.
- McLeod, Geo A (1930). History of Alturas and Blaine Counties, Idaho (PDF). Hailey, Idaho, USA: The Hailey Times.
