= Galinakopf =

Eastern Alpine mountain on Austria-Liechtenstein border

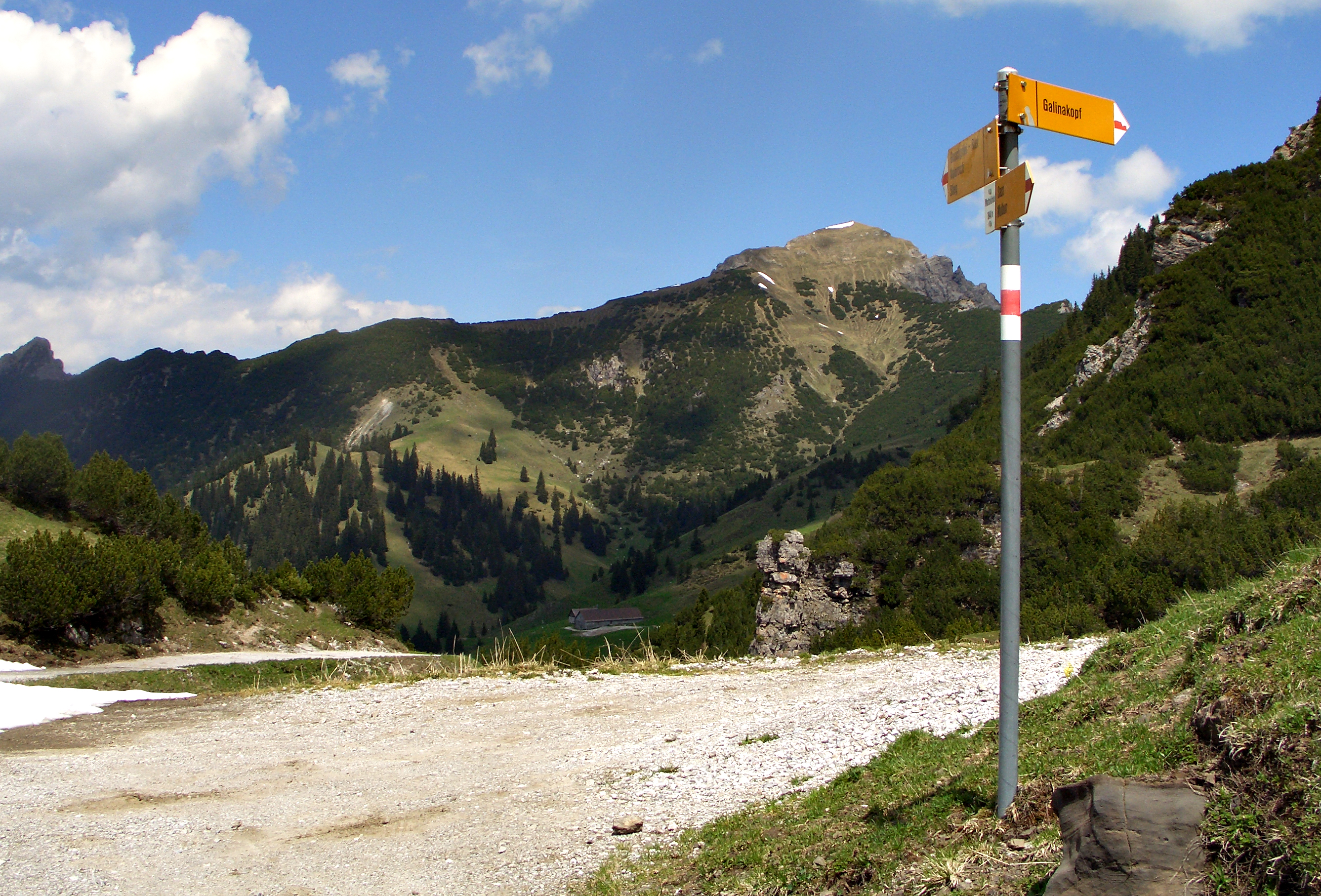

Highest point
- Elevation: 2,198 m (7,211 ft)
- Coordinates: 47°09′06″N 9°37′14″E

Geography
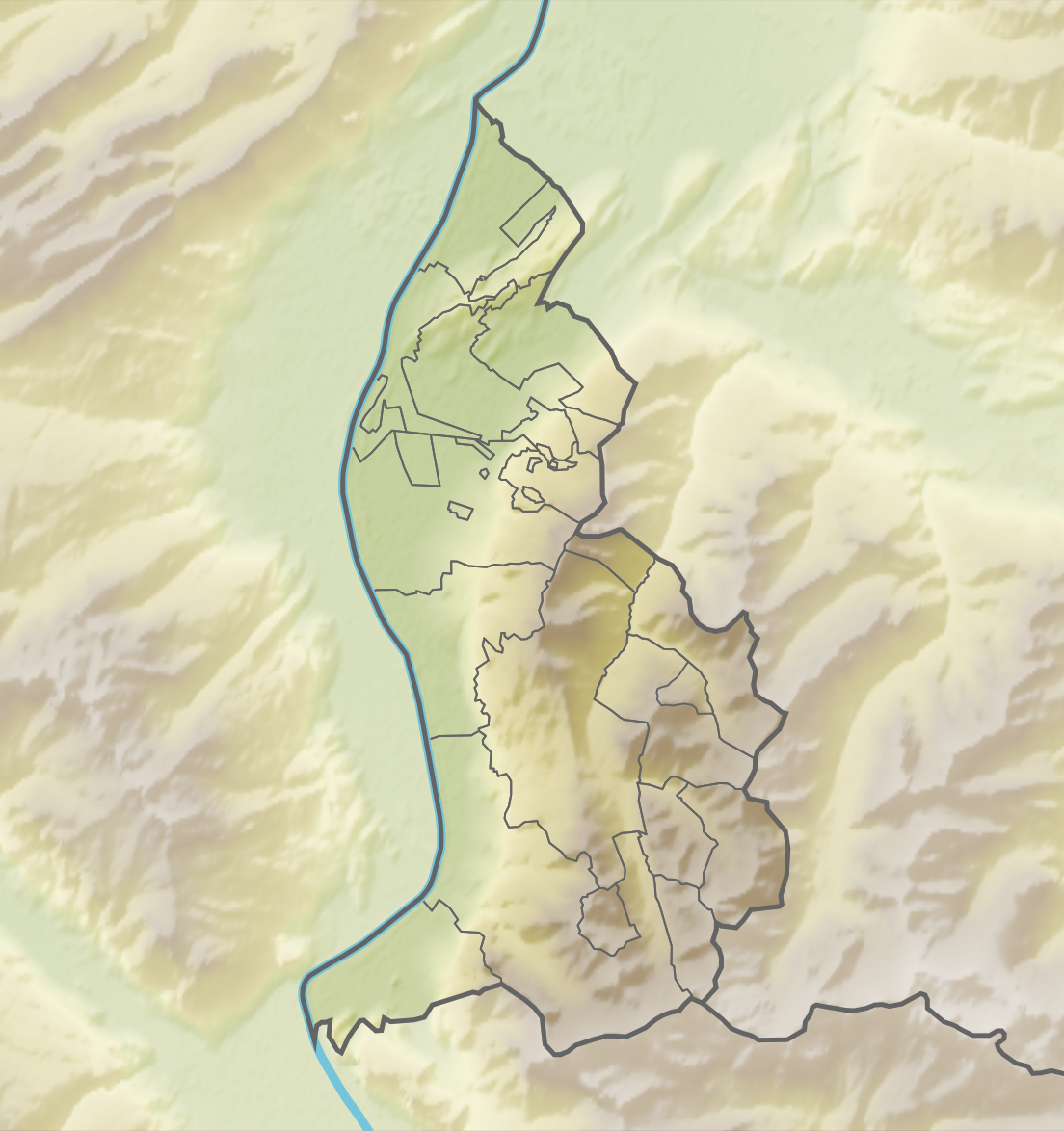
- Location within Liechtenstein
- Location: Liechtenstein / Vorarlberg, Austria
- Parent range: Rätikon, Alps

Galinakopf is a mountain on the border of Austria and Liechtenstein in the Rätikon range of the Eastern Alps, with a height of 2,198 metres (7,211 ft).
