= Galena High School =

Galena High School may refer to one of several high schools in the United States:

- Galena Junior/Senior High School — Galena, Alaska - Galena City School District
- Galena High School (Illinois) — Galena, Illinois
- Galena High School (Kansas) — Galena, Kansas
- Galena High School (Missouri) — Galena, Missouri
- Galena High School (Nevada) — Reno, Nevada
- Galena Park High School — Galena Park, Texas
