= 427 Galene =

Main-belt asteroid

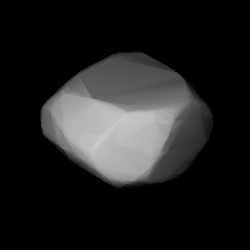
- Modelled shape of Galene from its lightcurve

Discovery
- Discovered by: Auguste Charlois
- Discovery date: 27 August 1897

Designations
- Pronunciation: /ɡəˈliːniː/
- Alternative designations: 1897 DJ
- Minor planet category: Main belt
- Adjectives: Galenean /ɡælɪˈniːən/

Orbital characteristics
- Epoch 31 July 2016 (JD 2457600.5)
- Uncertainty parameter 0
- Observation arc: 110.93 yr (40,519 d) 110.93 yr (40519 d)
- Aphelion: 3.32976 AU (498.125 Gm)
- Perihelion: 2.61263 AU (390.844 Gm)
- Semi-major axis: 2.97119 AU (444.484 Gm)
- Eccentricity: 0.12068
- Orbital period (sidereal): 5.12 yr (1,870.7 d) 5.12 yr (1870.7 d)
- Mean anomaly: 90.0900°
- Mean motion: 0° 11^{m} 32.806^{s} / day
- Inclination: 5.12388°
- Longitude of ascending node: 297.424°
- Argument of perihelion: 12.2909°

Physical characteristics
- Dimensions: 29.98±1.2 km
- Synodic rotation period: 3.705 h (0.1544 d)
- Geometric albedo: 0.2364±0.020
- Absolute magnitude (H): 10.2

427 Galene is a typical main belt asteroid. It was discovered by the French astronomer Auguste Charlois on 27 August 1897 from Nice, and was named after Galene, one of the Nereids of Greek mythology (Hesiod, Theogony 240). This asteroid is orbiting the Sun at a distance of 2.97 AU with a period of 5.12 yr and an eccentricity of 0.12. A computer search suggests it is the most likely parent body of the impactor that generated the temporary cometary activity of 7968 Elst–Pizarro in 1996.

Analysis of the light curve generated from photometry data collected during 2009 show a rotation period of 3.705±0.005 h with a brightness variation of 0.6 in magnitude. Based upon an albedo of 0.26±0.03, this asteroid spans a diameter of 33.8±2.0 km.
