= Galena Township =

Galena Township may refer to one of the following places in the United States:

- Galena Township, LaPorte County, Indiana
- Galena Township, Martin County, Minnesota
- Galena Township, Jasper County, Missouri
- Galena Township, Dixon County, Nebraska

== See also ==
- East Galena Township, Jo Daviess County, Illinois
- West Galena Township, Jo Daviess County, Illinois
