= Hayden Pass Fire =

2016 wildfire in Colorado, United States

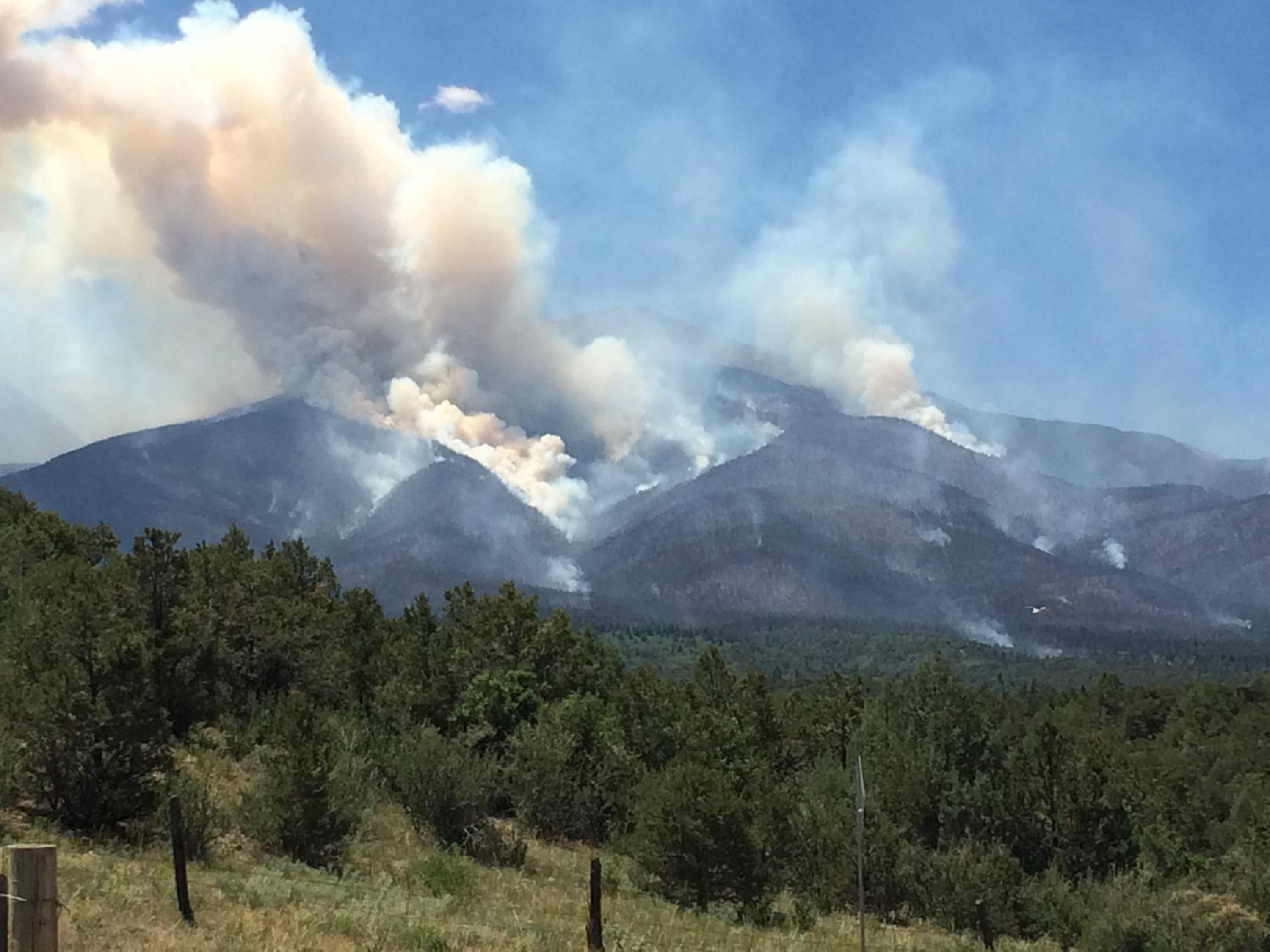
- The fire as seen on July 14
- Date: July 8, 2016
- Location: Sangre de Cristo Range, Hayden Pass, Colorado
- Coordinates: 38.292°N 105.833°W

Statistics
- Burned area: 16,754 acres (68 km^{2})

Ignition
- Cause: Lightning

Map
- The fire's location within Colorado.

The Hayden Creek Fire is a wildfire ignited by lightning on July 8, 2016 in the Sangre de Cristo Range on the east side of Hayden Pass in southern Colorado. As of July 20, 2016, the fire had burned about 16,000 acres. For the most part, the fire remained on United States Forest Service lands south of Coaldale, Colorado.

Much of the fire is located in steep terrain within the Sangre de Cristo Wilderness. Beetle-killed trees were supplying fuel. Due to the steep terrain and intensity of the fire, control efforts, for the most part, were limited to building fire lines and removing fuels in the anticipated path of the fire. As of July 16, only one seasonal summer cabin had been destroyed, but residents of nearby housing had been evacuated. As of July 21, evacuations were ending. As the fire expends beyond NFS lands the vegetation burning changes from mixed conifers to Scrub oak and Pinyon pine. As of July 31, the perimeter of the fire is 60% contained, with about 100 people continuing to work on the fire. The perimeter containment goal is 60%, with total control anticipated by 12:AM October 1. As of July 20, it is anticipated that the fire will move south toward Rainbow Lake, the Brush Creek drainage and Wulsten Baldy at the top of the range.
