= Galina, Perm Krai =

Galina Галина
- Village
- Location within Perm Krai Location within Russia
- Coordinates: 58°51′N 54°34′E
- Country: Russia
- Region: Perm Krai
- District: Kudymkarsky District
- Time zone: UTC+5:00

Galina (Russian: Галина) is a rural locality (a village) in Leninskoye Rural Settlement, Kudymkarsky District, Perm Krai, Russia. The population was 19 as of 2010.

== Geography ==
Galina is located 31 km southwest of Kudymkar (the district's administrative centre) by road. Kosogor is the nearest rural locality.
