= Hayden Pass =

Mountain pass in Colorado, USA

Coordinates: 38°17′35″N 105°50′59″W

Hayden Pass is a mountain pass in Colorado over the Sangre de Cristo Range. It is traversed by a jeep trail that starts, at the west end, at Villa Grove, Colorado and, at the east end, at Coaldale, Colorado. The Hayden Creek drainage, on the east side of the pass, was the site of the Hayden Pass Fire. The elevation at the top of the pass is 10,676 feet (3,254 m).
