= Galena Pass =

Mountain pass in British Columbia, Canada

- Location within British Columbia

Third Approach
- Location: British Columbia, Canada
- Coordinates: 50°41′00″N 117°46′00″W
- Topo map: NTS 82K12 Beaton

Galena Pass is a low mountain pass in southeastern British Columbia, Canada, southeast of Revelstoke.

It is located on BC 31 just east of Galena Bay on Galena Bay, connecting from that ferry terminal to Beaton on the nearby Beaton Arm of Arrow Lake.
