= British Columbia Highway 3B =

Highway in British Columbia, Canada

Highway 3B

Route information
- Maintained by the Ministry of Transportation and Infrastructure
- Length: 68 km (42 mi)
- Existed: 1967–present

Major junctions
- West end: Highway 3 near Nancy Greene Lake
- Highway 22 south in Rossland; Highway 22 north in Trail; Highway 22A in Trail
- East end: Highway 3 near Meadows

Location
- Country: Canada
- Province: British Columbia

Highway system
- British Columbia provincial highways
← Highway 3A	→ Highway 4

Highway 3B is an alternate loop to the Crowsnest Highway (Highway 3) between Nancy Greene Lake and an area called Meadows, just west of Erie on the Crowsnest. Originally, Highway 3B went between Nancy Greene Lake to Trail, where the Crowsnest picked up the route to the Meadows area. One of its original component sections, the Rossland and Nancy Greene Lake was opened on the 1st of October 1965 at a cost of $3.5 million (equivalent to $34.4 million in 2022)

Originally, Highway 3B only went between Nancy Greene Lake and Trail, where the Crowsnest picked up the route to the Meadows area. However, in 1978, Highway 3 was re-routed off the present-day Highway 3B alignment east of Trail because a new segment of Highway 3 between Castlegar and Meadows was opened.

== Route details ==
Highway 3B's western terminus is at the Crowsnest Highway near Nancy Greene Lake. The route travels 45 km (28 mi) southeast to the village of Rossland, where Highway 22 merges onto Highway 3B. The two highways share the route for the next 10 km (6.2 mi) east to Trail, where Highway 22 diverges north, with Highway 22A following Highway 3B east for 7 km (4.3 mi) to its departure just west of the village of Montrose for the Waneta border crossing. Highway 3B proceeds northeast for 23 km (14 mi), through the villages of Montrose and Fruitvale, to the location of Meadows, where it again meets up with the Crowsnest.

== Major intersections ==
Regional District	Location	km	mi	Destinations	Notes
Kootenay Boundary	Nancy Greene Provincial Park	0.00	0.00	Highway 3 (Crowsnest Highway) – Grand Forks, Castlegar, Nelson	Highway 3B western terminus
Kootenay Boundary	Rossland	28.03	17.42	Highway 22 south – USA border (Paterson), Spokane	West end of Highway 22 concurrency; to SR 25 south
Kootenay Boundary	Warfield	35.06	21.79		
Kootenay Boundary	Trail	37.80	23.49	Highway 22 north – Castlegar	East end of Highway 22 concurrency
Kootenay Boundary	Trail	38.57	23.97	Victoria Street Bridge crosses the Columbia River	
Kootenay Boundary	Trail	45.11	28.03	Highway 22A south – Airport, USA border (Waneta)	
Kootenay Boundary	Montrose	48.64	30.22		
Kootenay Boundary	Fruitvale	54.06	33.59		
Central Kootenay		68.34	42.46	Highway 3 (Crowsnest Highway) – Castlegar, Salmo, Cranbrook	Highway 3B eastern terminus; continues as Highway 3 east
1.000 mi = 1.609 km; 1.000 km = 0.621 mi: Concurrency terminus

== See also ==
- Crowsnest Highway
