= British Columbia Highway 22A =

Highway in British Columbia, Canada

Highway 22A
- Waneta Highway
- Highway 22A highlighted in red

Route information
- Maintained by the Ministry of Transportation and Infrastructure
- Length: 11.14 km (6.92 mi)
- Existed: 1967–present

Major junctions
- South end: Waneta Road at the U.S. border at Waneta
- North end: Highway 3B near Montrose

Location
- Country: Canada
- Province: British Columbia

Highway system
- British Columbia provincial highways
| ← Highway 22 | → Highway 23 |

Highway 22A is a cross-border spur in the West Kootenay region of the province. The highway was opened in 1967, and its number is derived from former Secondary State Highway 22A, with which the highway connected at the Canada–US border. Highway 22A connects Highway 3B east of Montrose to the border town of Waneta, 11 km (7 mi) south of the 3B junction.

== Major intersections ==
The entire route is in Kootenay Boundary Regional District.

| Location | km | mi | Destinations | Notes |
|---|---|---|---|---|
| Waneta | 0.00 | 0.00 | Waneta Road | Continuation into Washington |
| Waneta | 0.00 | 0.00 | Canada – United States border at Boundary-Waneta Border Crossing | |
| Trail | 11.14 | 6.92 | Highway 3B – Fruitvale | Northern terminus |
1.000 mi = 1.609 km; 1.000 km = 0.621 mi
