= Nancy Greene Provincial Park =

Provincial park in British Columbia, Canada

- IUCN category II (national park)
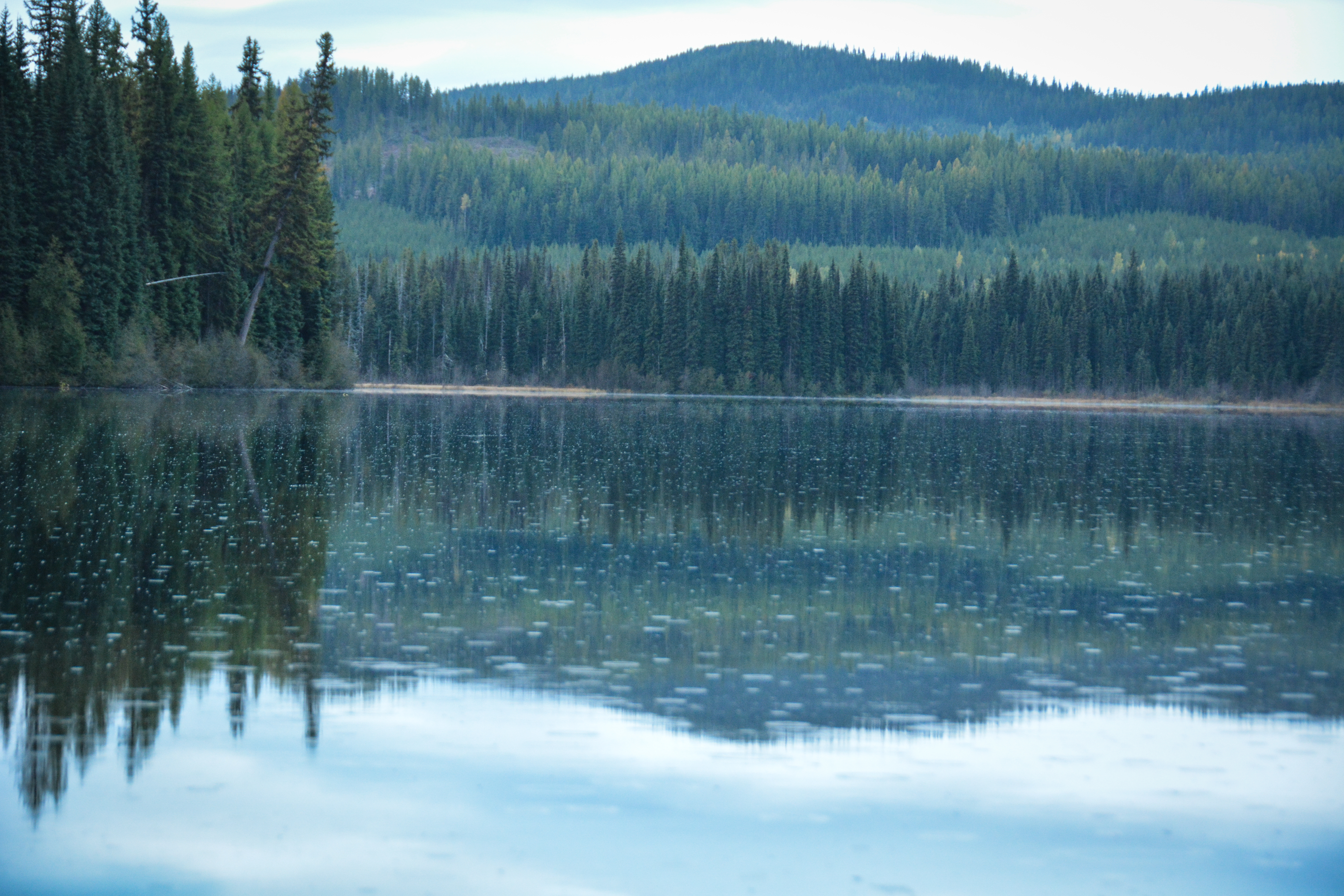
- Nancy Greene Lake

- Location within British Columbia
- Interactive map of Nancy Greene Provincial Park
- Location: British Columbia, Canada
- Nearest city: Rossland, Castlegar
- Coordinates: 49°15′19″N 117°56′30″W
- Area: 203 ha (500 acres)
- Established: 1972
- Governing body: BC Parks

Nancy Greene Provincial Park is a provincial park in British Columbia, Canada, located approximately 27 km (17 mi) northwest of the city of Rossland and 31 km (19 mi) west of the city of Castlegar in that province's West Kootenay region, at the junction of Highway 3 and Highway 3B. It is named for Nancy Greene, Canadian Olympic medallist in downhill skiing, who is a native of Rossland.

The park offers camping, canoeing, fishing, swimming, and cross-country skiing, as well as a short hiking trail. Nancy Greene has 10 parking lot style sites. The large parking lot allows open parking and can accommodate extra vehicles or larger rigs. There is one walk-in tent site located just above the beach area.

Grizzly bears routinely frequent the park in the spring to feed on vegetation. Pets/domestic animals must be on a leash at all times and are not allowed in beach areas or park buildings. Power boats are prohibited.

== See also ==
- List of British Columbia Provincial Parks
- List of Canadian provincial parks
