= Warfield, British Columbia =

Warfield
- Village
- The Corporation of the Village of Warfield
- Nickname: Jewel of the Kootenays
- Location of Warfield in British Columbia
- Coordinates: 49°05′43″N 117°44′42″W
- Country: Canada
- Province: British Columbia
- Region: West Kootenay
- Regional district: Kootenay-Boundary
- Incorporated: 8 December 1952

Government
  - Governing body: Warfield Village Council
  - Mayor: Frank Marino

Area
  - Total: 1.9 km^{2} (0.73 sq mi)
- Elevation: 600 m (2,000 ft)

Population (2016)
  - Total: 1,680
- Time zone: UTC−07:00 (PT)
- Area codes: 250, 778, 236, & 672
- Highways: Highway 3B; Highway 22
- Website: Official website

Warfield is a village at the bottom of the Rossland hill, immediately west of Trail, in the West Kootenay region of southern British Columbia.

== Settlement ==
Warfield was named after Carlos Warfield, a business partner of Fritz Augustus Heinze, who built the Trail smelter arbitration (1938–1942). Annable, Mickey Mouse Town, and Minnie Mouse Town are among its six distinct neighbourhoods. In the 1930s, the Consolidated Mining and Smelting Company (CM&S) built a residential area to house employees. Warfield incorporated as a village in 1952.

== Fertilizer farm ==
In 1919, CM&S bought a tract of land at Warfield to supply cheap produce for its workers, and show that pollution from the Trail smelter was not as significant as critics claimed, but the farm proved the converse. Following the installation of a pollution control device in 1925, the captured dust was taken to a plant built at the farm that converted the material into a variety of fertilizers. By 1931, the company produced hydrogen, nitrogen, ammonia, ammonia sulphate, phosphite and phosphoric acid-based products.

By 1941, the Warfield plant output of ordinance-grade ammonium nitrate was directed to munitions during World War II. In addition, the US military needed heavy water for the Manhattan Project. The only two sources in the world were Vemork, Norway, under German occupation, and Trail, where electrolytic hydrogen was a by-product of the CM&S sulfur recovery process. CM&S was directed by the federal government to build a heavy water plant at Warfield, which was funded by the US, and operated from 1943 to 1956. A 14-storey concrete building in the midst of the fertilizer complex has evidenced the strategic project.

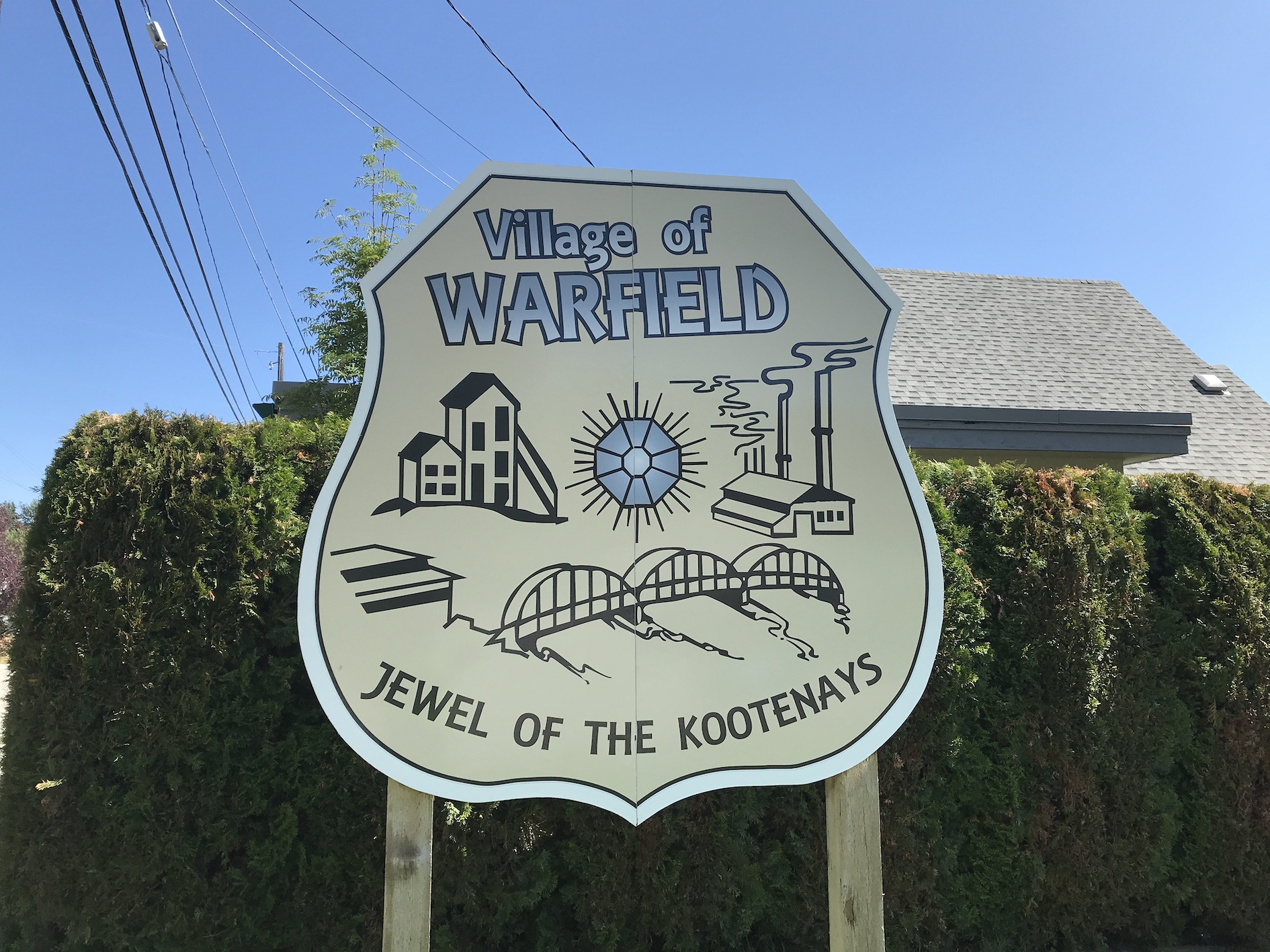
Warfield's welcome sign

== Rossland CP line ==
In 1896, Warfield was one of two intermediate stations opened. In 1966, Canadian Pacific Railway (CP) abandoned the Rossland spur west of Warfield.

== Demographics ==
In the 2021 Census of Population conducted by Statistics Canada, Warfield had a population of 1,753 living in 798 of its 828 total private dwellings, a change of 4.3% from its 2016 population of 1,680. With a land area of 1.89 km^{2} (0.73 sq mi), it had a population density of 927.5/km^{2} (2,402.2/sq mi) in 2021.

=== Religion ===
According to the 2021 census, religious groups in Warfield included:

- Irreligion (1,060 persons or 60.7%)
- Christianity (635 persons or 36.4%)
- Other (10 persons or 0.6%)

== Government ==
On the provincial level, Warfield is a part of the electoral district of Kootenay West (provincial electoral district). The riding, which has traditionally voted for the British Columbia New Democratic Party, is currently represented by NDP MLA Katrine Conroy.

In the House of Commons of Canada, Warfield is represented in the electoral district of South Okanagan—West Kootenay. Created prior to the 2015 General Election, the seat is currently held by NDP Member of Parliament Richard Cannings (British Columbia politician).

== School District ==
The current school district for Warfield is School District 20 Kootenay-Columbia. Currently, Warfield offers one elementary school.

== Schools ==
| School | Enrollment | Grades | Mascot | Principal | Offered sports |
|---|---|---|---|---|---|
| James L Webster Elementary School | 295 | K-7 | Leo the Lion | Ms Shelly McKay | Volleyball (6–7), Basketball (6–7), Cross Country (1–7), and Track (4–7). |
| Warfield Preschool (Closed in 2026) | Not confirmed | Preschool (3–5 years old) | Not known | Ms Shelly McKay | N/A |

== Climate ==
Warfield has a humid continental climate (Dfb) with warm, sometimes hot summer days along with cool nights and moderately cold, snowy winters with annual snowfall averaging 179.1 cm (70.5 in).

Climate data for Warfield
| Month | Jan | Feb | Mar | Apr | May | Jun | Jul | Aug | Sep | Oct | Nov | Dec | Year |
|---|---|---|---|---|---|---|---|---|---|---|---|---|---|
| Record high °C (°F) | 11.1 (52.0) | 14.0 (57.2) | 22.0 (71.6) | 30.6 (87.1) | 35.6 (96.1) | 44.8 (112.6) | 41.4 (106.5) | 41.6 (106.9) | 36.6 (97.9) | 26.1 (79.0) | 18.3 (64.9) | 14.4 (57.9) | 44.8 (112.6) |
| Mean daily maximum °C (°F) | 0.4 (32.7) | 3.3 (37.9) | 9.1 (48.4) | 15.1 (59.2) | 20.8 (69.4) | 23.9 (75.0) | 29.3 (84.7) | 29.5 (85.1) | 23.1 (73.6) | 13.0 (55.4) | 4.6 (40.3) | 0.1 (32.2) | 14.4 (57.9) |
| Daily mean °C (°F) | −1.7 (28.9) | 0.2 (32.4) | 4.4 (39.9) | 9.1 (48.4) | 14.0 (57.2) | 17.1 (62.8) | 21.2 (70.2) | 21.1 (70.0) | 16.0 (60.8) | 8.2 (46.8) | 2.0 (35.6) | −1.7 (28.9) | 9.2 (48.6) |
| Mean daily minimum °C (°F) | −4.0 (24.8) | −3.1 (26.4) | −0.4 (31.3) | 2.8 (37.0) | 7.2 (45.0) | 10.3 (50.5) | 13.0 (55.4) | 12.5 (54.5) | 8.7 (47.7) | 3.5 (38.3) | −0.6 (30.9) | −3.9 (25.0) | 3.8 (38.8) |
| Record low °C (°F) | −27.8 (−18.0) | −27.2 (−17.0) | −21.1 (−6.0) | −11.1 (12.0) | −4.5 (23.9) | 2.8 (37.0) | 0.6 (33.1) | 4.0 (39.2) | −3.0 (26.6) | −13.3 (8.1) | −20.5 (−4.9) | −31.1 (−24.0) | −31.1 (−24.0) |
| Average precipitation mm (inches) | 78.4 (3.09) | 60.6 (2.39) | 66.1 (2.60) | 62.0 (2.44) | 74.0 (2.91) | 74.4 (2.93) | 48.2 (1.90) | 35.5 (1.40) | 39.7 (1.56) | 51.4 (2.02) | 96.5 (3.80) | 92.4 (3.64) | 779.0 (30.67) |
| Average rainfall mm (inches) | 27.8 (1.09) | 35.2 (1.39) | 55.8 (2.20) | 60.7 (2.39) | 73.9 (2.91) | 74.4 (2.93) | 48.2 (1.90) | 35.5 (1.40) | 39.7 (1.56) | 49.7 (1.96) | 64.4 (2.54) | 34.7 (1.37) | 599.9 (23.62) |
| Average snowfall cm (inches) | 50.6 (19.9) | 25.4 (10.0) | 10.3 (4.1) | 1.4 (0.6) | 0.1 (0.0) | 0.0 (0.0) | 0.0 (0.0) | 0.0 (0.0) | 0.0 (0.0) | 1.7 (0.7) | 32.0 (12.6) | 57.7 (22.7) | 179.1 (70.5) |
| Average precipitation days (≥ 0.2 mm) | 15.2 | 13.6 | 14.5 | 14.4 | 15.7 | 15.1 | 9.0 | 7.7 | 7.6 | 11.4 | 17.0 | 16.1 | 157.2 |
| Average rainy days (≥ 0.2 mm) | 6.7 | 8.1 | 12.9 | 14.4 | 15.7 | 15.1 | 9.0 | 7.7 | 7.6 | 11.3 | 13.1 | 5.1 | 126.6 |
| Average snowy days (≥ 0.2 cm) | 10.6 | 7.3 | 3.0 | 0.6 | 0.1 | 0.0 | 0.0 | 0.0 | 0.0 | 0.5 | 6.5 | 12.8 | 41.3 |
Source 1:
Source 2:
