= Frontier–Paterson Border Crossing =

Border crossing between Canada and the United States

Frontier-Paterson Border Crossing
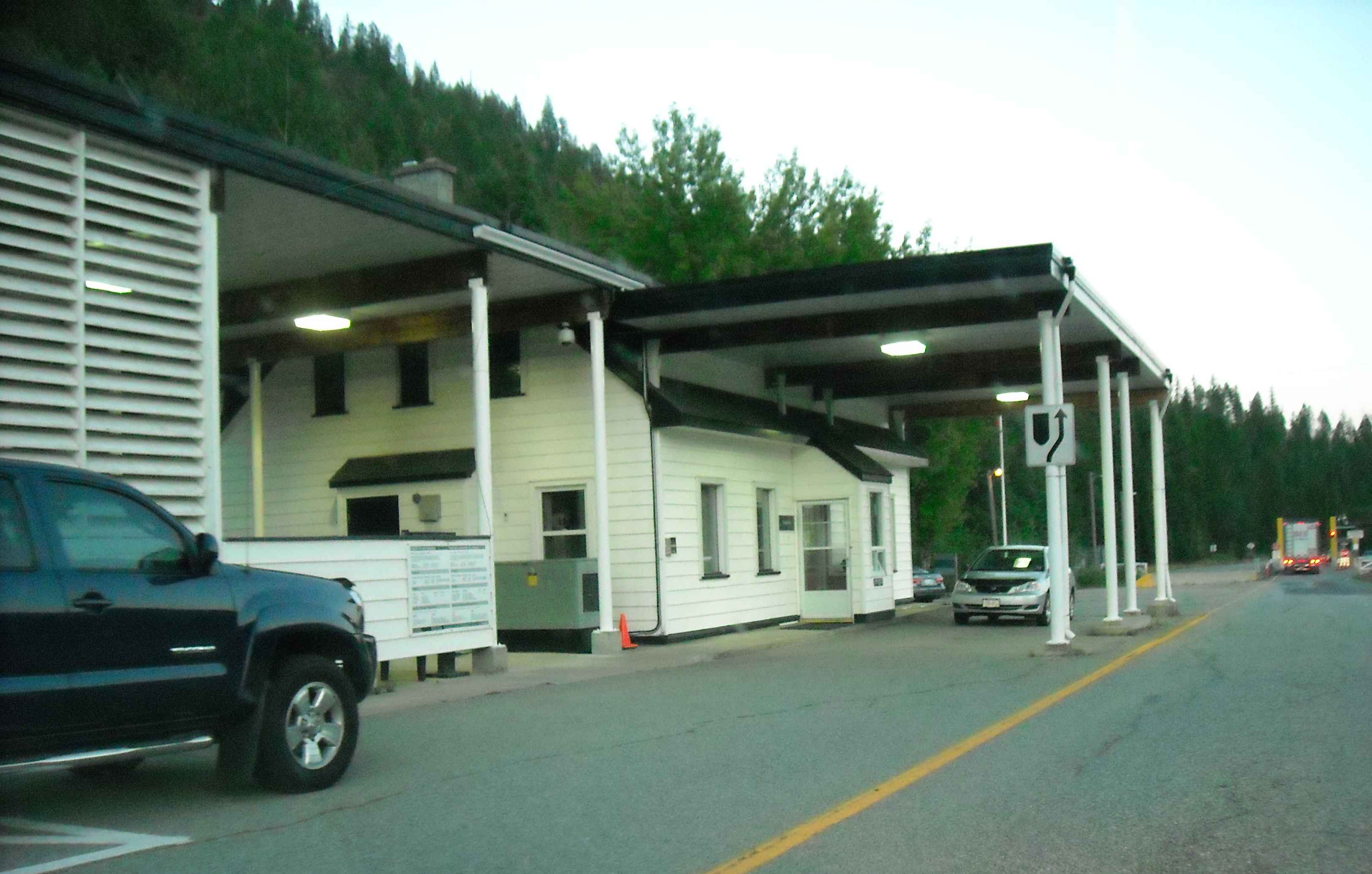
- Canada Border Inspection Station at Paterson, British Columbia

Locaiton
- Country: United States; Canada
- Location: SR 25 / Highway 22; US Port: 4939 Highway 25 North, Northport, WA 99157; Canadian Port: 10 Highway 22, Rossland, BC V0G 1Y0
- Coordinates: 49.000485°N 117.831631°W

Details
- Opened: 1898

Website
- http://www.cbp.gov/contact/ports/oroville-wa

The Frontier–Paterson Border Crossing connects the town of Northport, Washington with Rossland, British Columbia on the Canada–US border. It can be reached by Washington State Route 25 on the American side and British Columbia Highway 22 on the Canadian side.

This crossing is open 24 hours per day, 7 days per week.

== Canadian former name ==
By 1896, the border location may have been called Clark's Camp, but other sources place the camp south of the border. In December of that year, the Red Mountain branch of the Spokane Falls and Northern Railroad linked Rossland and Spokane. The border train station was called Sheep Creek, after the adjacent stream to the west, now called Little Sheep Creek. Opening in 1897 or 1898, the Canadian port of entry to serve the railway was known as Sheep Creek.

== Canadian rename ==
In 1900, Paterson became the border post name. Several Canadian ports of entry are named after the first permanent customs officer to serve at the location. Archibald (Archie) Neil Paterson assumed the role in January 1898 and became postmaster in September 1899. Archie was unsure if the change acknowledged him, William Paterson, Canada's Minister of Customs, or both. Some sources claim the name referred to Thomas Wilson Paterson, a Vancouver Island railway manager, and later lieutenant governor. The train station name change was in 1905. Canada currently operates out of a 1950s-era border station.

US Border Station at Frontier, WA in 2009

== US facility ==
The US built its first border station at Frontier in 1965, and replaced it with a new station in 2011. Prior to 1965, visitors entering from Canada at both this crossing and at the Boundary-Waneta border crossing were directed to proceed to the customs office in Northport, Washington, several miles away. Frontier was the name of the Washington post office that operated 1901–1912.

== See also ==
- List of Canada–United States border crossings
