= List of villages in British Columbia =

A village is a classification of municipalities used in the Canadian province of British Columbia. British Columbia's Lieutenant Governor in Council may incorporate a community as a village by letters patent, under the recommendation of the Minister of Communities, Sport and Cultural Development, if its population is not greater than 2,500 and the outcome of a vote involving affected residents was that greater than 50% voted in favour of the proposed incorporation.

British Columbia has 42 villages that had a cumulative population of 48,511 and an average population of 1,155 in the 2021 Census. British Columbia's largest and smallest villages are Cumberland and Zeballos with populations of 4,447 and 126 respectively.

Of British Columbia's current 42 villages, the first to incorporate as a village was Kaslo on August 14, 1893, while the most recent community to incorporate as a village was Queen Charlotte on December 5, 2005 (later renamed to Daajing Giids on July 13, 2022).

== List ==
Village	Corporate name	Regional district	Incorporation date	Population (2021)	Population (2016)	Change (%)	Area (km²)	Population density
Alert Bay	Alert Bay, The Corporation of the Village of	Mount Waddington	January 14, 1946	449	479	−6.3	1.69	265.3
Anmore	Anmore, Village of	Greater Vancouver	December 7, 1987	2,356	2,210	6.6	27.53	85.6
Ashcroft	Ashcroft, The Corporation of the Village of	Thompson-Nicola	June 27, 1952	1,670	1,558	7.2	50.86	32.8
Belcarra	Belcarra, Village of	Greater Vancouver	August 22, 1979	687	643	6.8	5.50	124.8
Burns Lake	Burns Lake, The Corporation of the Village of	Bulkley-Nechako	December 6, 1923	1,659	1,779	−6.7	6.54	253.7
Cache Creek	Cache Creek, Village of	Thompson-Nicola	November 28, 1967	969	963	0.6	10.40	93.2
Canal Flats	Canal Flats, Village of	East Kootenay	June 29, 2004	802	668	20.1	11.07	72.5
Chase	Chase, Village of	Thompson-Nicola	April 22, 1969	2,399	2,286	4.9	3.75	639.3
Clinton	Clinton, Village of	Thompson-Nicola	July 16, 1963	568	641	−11.4	8.14	69.7
Cumberland	Cumberland, The Corporation of the Village of	Comox Valley	January 1, 1898	4,447	3,753	18.5	29.04	153.1
Daajing Giids (Note: Daajing Giids was formerly known as Queen Charlotte prior to July 13, 2022.)	Daajing Giids, Village of	North Coast	December 5, 2005	964	884	9.0	35.58	27.1
Fraser Lake	Fraser Lake, Village of	Bulkley-Nechako	September 27, 1966	965	988	−2.3	4.06	237.4
Fruitvale	Fruitvale, The Corporation of the Village of	Kootenay Boundary	November 4, 1952	1,958	1,920	2.0	2.70	724.7
Gold River	Gold River, Village of	Strathcona	August 26, 1965	1,246	1,212	2.8	10.92	114.2
Granisle (Note: Granisle was founded as a company town by Granisle Copper Ltd. prior to its incorporation in 1971.)	Granisle, Village of	Bulkley-Nechako	June 29, 1971	337	303	11.2	39.85	8.5
Harrison Hot Springs	Harrison Hot Springs, Village of	Fraser Valley	May 27, 1949	1,905	1,468	29.8	5.49	347.3
Hazelton	Hazelton, The Corporation of the Village of	Kitimat-Stikine	February 15, 1956	257	313	−17.9	2.89	89.1
Kaslo	Kaslo, Village of	Central Kootenay	August 14, 1893	1,049	968	8.4	3.01	348.7
Keremeos	Keremeos, The Corporation of the Village of	Okanagan-Similkameen	October 30, 1956	1,608	1,502	7.1	2.09	768.3
Lions Bay	Lions Bay, Village of	Greater Vancouver	December 17, 1970	1,390	1,334	4.2	2.53	549.0
Lumby	Lumby, The Corporation of the Village of	North Okanagan	December 20, 1955	2,063	1,833	12.5	5.93	347.7
Lytton	Lytton, The Corporation of the Village of	Thompson-Nicola	May 3, 1945	210	249	−15.7	6.73	31.2
Masset	Masset, Village of	North Coast	May 11, 1961	838	793	5.7	20.69	40.5
McBride	McBride, The Corporation of the Village of	Fraser-Fort George	April 7, 1932	588	616	−4.5	4.62	127.4
Midway	Midway, Village of	Kootenay Boundary	May 25, 1967	651	649	0.3	12.23	53.2
Montrose	Montrose, The Corporation of the Village of	Kootenay Boundary	June 22, 1956	1,013	996	1.7	1.46	693.1
Nakusp	Nakusp, Village of	Central Kootenay	November 24, 1964	1,589	1,605	−1.0	8.04	197.7
New Denver	New Denver, The Corporation of the Village of	Central Kootenay	January 12, 1929	487	473	3.0	0.87	559.6
Pemberton	Pemberton, Village of	Squamish-Lillooet	July 20, 1956	3,407	2,574	32.4	61.36	55.5
Port Alice	Port Alice, Village of	Mount Waddington	June 16, 1965	739	664	11.3	7.03	105.1
Port Clements	Port Clements, Village of	North Coast	December 31, 1975	340	282	20.6	13.07	26.0
Pouce Coupe	Pouce Coupe, The Corporation of the Village of	Peace River	January 6, 1932	762	792	−3.8	2.06	370.3
Radium Hot Springs	Radium Hot Springs, Village of	East Kootenay	December 10, 1990	1,339	776	72.6	6.34	211.3
Salmo	Salmo, The Corporation of the Village of	Central Kootenay	October 30, 1946	1,140	1,141	−0.1	2.44	466.4
Sayward	Sayward, Village of	Strathcona	June 27, 1968	334	311	7.4	4.44	75.2
Silverton	Silverton, The Corporation of the Village of	Central Kootenay	May 6, 1930	149	195	−23.6	0.35	420.8
Slocan	Slocan, Village of	Central Kootenay	June 1, 1901	379	289	31.1	0.78	488.6
Tahsis	Tahsis, Village of	Strathcona	June 17, 1970	393	248	58.5	5.26	74.7
Telkwa	Telkwa, The Corporation of the Village of	Bulkley-Nechako	July 18, 1952	1,474	1,327	11.1	7.04	209.5
Valemount	Valemount, Village of	Fraser-Fort George	December 13, 1962	1,052	1,021	3.0	5.16	203.8
Warfield	Warfield, The Corporation of the Village of	Kootenay Boundary	December 8, 1952	1,753	1,680	4.3	1.89	929.3
Zeballos	Zeballos, The Corporation of the Village of	Strathcona	June 27, 1952	126	107	17.8	1.55	81.4
Total villages	—	—	—	48,511	44,493	9.0	442.98	109.5

== Former villages ==
Fort Nelson held village status between April 8, 1971, and October 31, 1987, after which it was classified as a town before ultimately amalgamating with the Northern Rockies Regional District on February 6, 2009, to form the Northern Rockies Regional Municipality.

Kinnaird held village status between August 6, 1947, and August 5, 1967, after which it was classified as a town before ultimately amalgamating with the Town of Castlegar on January 1, 1974, to form the City of Castlegar.

Mission City held village status between December 12, 1939, and January 1, 1958, after which it was classified as a town before ultimately amalgamating with the District of Mission on November 1, 1969.

== Town status eligibility ==
As of the 2021 Census, two of the above villages – Cumberland and Pemberton – meet the requirement of having a population greater than 2,500 to incorporate as a town.

== See also ==
- List of communities in British Columbia
- List of municipalities in British Columbia
  - List of cities in British Columbia
  - List of district municipalities in British Columbia
  - List of towns in British Columbia
