= British Columbia Highway 22 =

Highway in British Columbia, Canada

Highway 22
- Paterson-Trail Highway; Schofield Highway

Route information
- Maintained by the Ministry of Transportation and Infrastructure
- Length: 46 km (29 mi)
- Existed: 1964–present

Major junctions
- South end: SR 25 at the U.S. border near Paterson
- Highway 3B in Rossland; Highway 3B in Trail
- North end: Highway 3 in Castlegar

Location
- Country: Canada
- Province: British Columbia

Highway system
- British Columbia provincial highways
← Highway 21	→ Highway 22A

Highway 22 is a north–south provincial highway in British Columbia that connects the city of Castlegar to the Canada–U.S. border. When the highway was first opened in 1964, it only went as far north from the border as Rossland. Highways 3 and 3B followed the present-day routing of Highway 22 north of Rossland at the time Highway 22 was first opened. The route north of Rossland was given to Highway 22 in 1979. The number of the highway is derived from then-Washington State Route 22 (renumbered to Route 25 in 1964), which Highway 22 meets at the border.

== Route details ==
The total distance covered by Highway 22 is 47 km (29 mi). It begins at the Canada-U.S. border at a location known as Paterson. From Paterson, Highway 22 goes north for 11 km (6.8 mi) to Rossland, where it meets Highway 3B. Highway 3B then carries Highway 22 east for 10 km (6.2 mi) to Trail where Highway 3B diverges east. Highway 22 then follows the Columbia River north for 26 km (16 mi) to where it meets the Crowsnest Highway at Castlegar.

== Major intersections ==
Regional District	Location	km	mi	Destinations	Notes
Kootenay Boundary	Paterson	0.00	0.00	SR 25 south – Northport, Kettle Falls	Continues into Washington
Kootenay Boundary	Paterson	0.00	0.00	Canada–United States border at Frontier-Paterson Border Crossing	
Kootenay Boundary	Rossland	10.50	6.52	Highway 3B west – Grand Forks	South end of Highway 3B concurrency
Kootenay Boundary	Warfield	17.53	10.89		
Kootenay Boundary	Trail	20.27	12.60	Highway 3B east to Highway 22A – City Centre, Salmo, USA border	North end of Highway 3B concurrency
Central Kootenay	Castlegar	46.48	28.88	Highway 3 (Crowsnest Highway) – Grand Forks, Nelson, Cranbrook Columbia Avenue – City Centre	Kinnaird interchange; continues as Columbia Avenue
1.000 mi = 1.609 km; 1.000 km = 0.621 mi: Concurrency terminus; Route transition
