= Fort Shepherd, British Columbia =

Fort Shepherd
- Location of Fort Shepherd in British Columbia
- Coordinates: 49°01′00″N 117°37′00″W
- Country: Canada
- Province: British Columbia

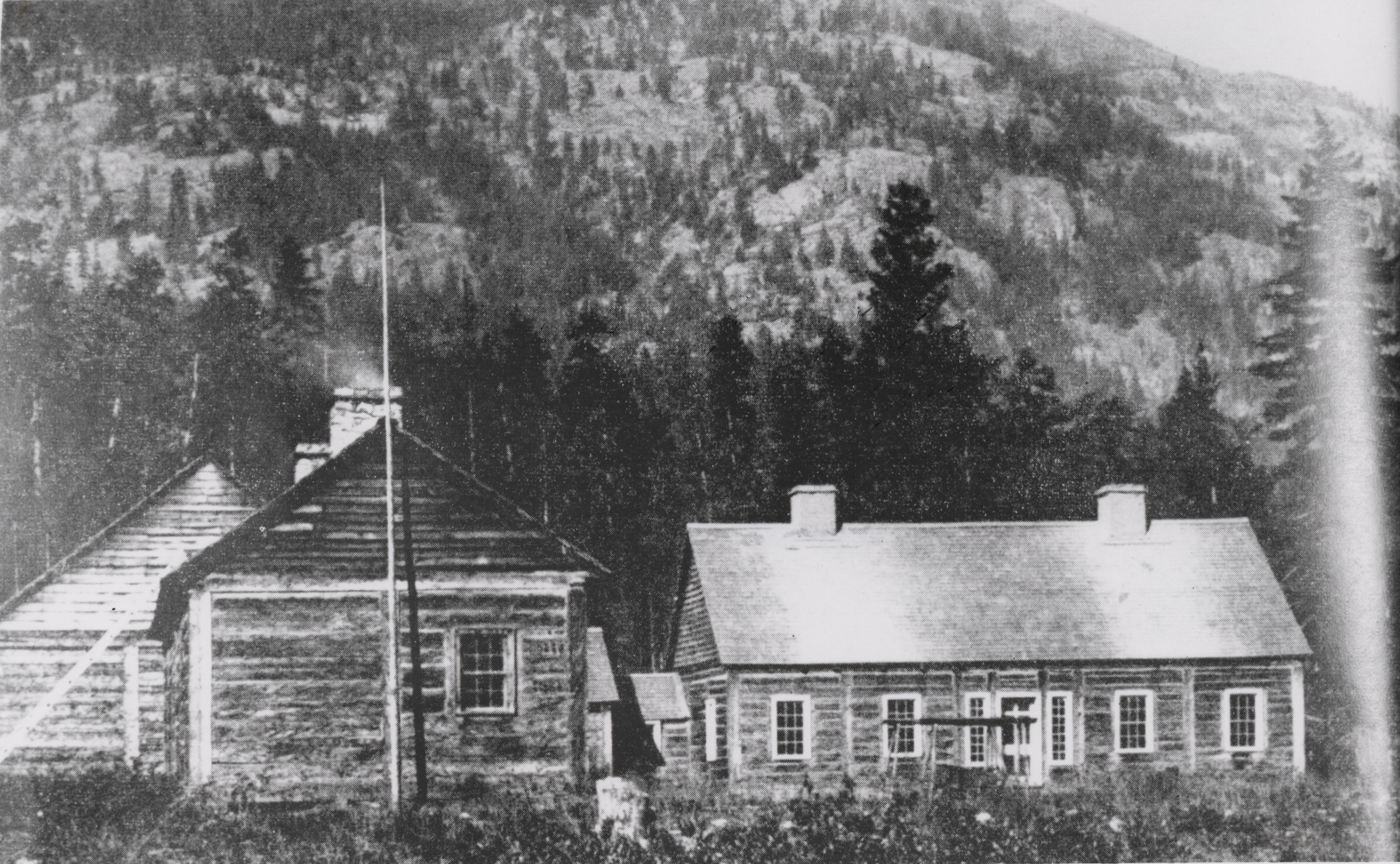
Black and white photograph of several wooden buildings Fort Shepherd, British Columbia. Left side of pair. 1861.

Fort Shepherd is the site of a former Hudson's Bay Company fort in the West Kootenay region of southern British Columbia. The fort was on the west side of the Columbia River, across from the mouth of the Pend-d'Oreille River, southwest of Trail.
