= Montrose, British Columbia =

Montrose
- Village
- The Corporation of the Village of Montrose
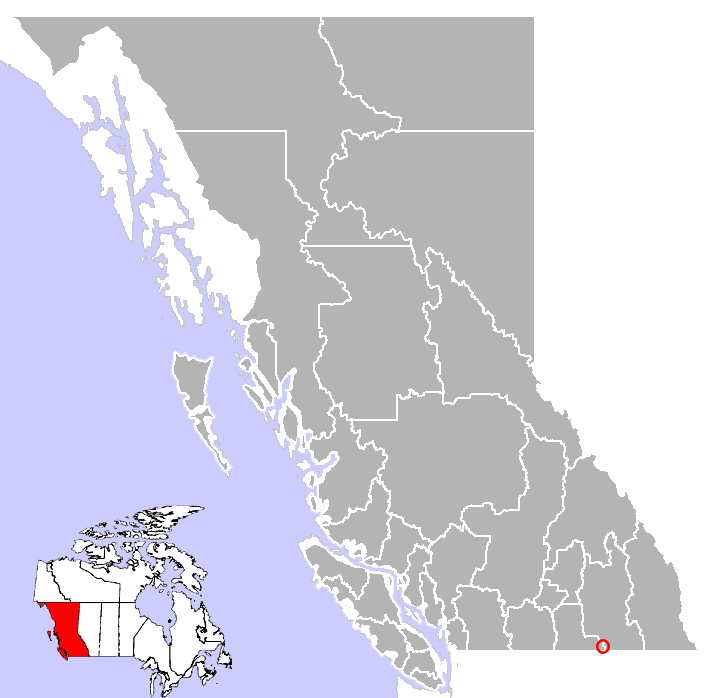
- Location of Montrose in British Columbia
- Coordinates: 49°04′44″N 117°35′32″W
- Country: Canada
- Province: British Columbia
- Region: West Kootenay
- Regional district: Kootenay-Boundary
- Incorporated: 1956

Government
  - Governing body: Montrose Village Council
  - Mayor: Mike Walsh

Area
  - Total: 1.52 km^{2} (0.59 sq mi)
- Elevation: 580 m (1,900 ft)

Population (2016)
  - Total: 996
- Time zone: UTC−07:00 (PT)
- Highways: 3B
- Waterways: Columbia River
- Website: Official website

Montrose is in the West Kootenay region of southeastern British Columbia. The village lies 7 kilometres (4 mi) east of the city of Trail along Highway 3B.

== Establishment ==
Smoke pollution triggered the legal dispute between American landowners in the region and the Trail Smelter. Since the 1910s, on the Canadian side of the border, the smelter had been buying out farmers who complained the smoke was killing their crops and orchards. Over 120 metres (400 ft) up the northern slopes of Beaver Creek, was a plateau comprising stumps and second growth known as Wood's Flats, much of which was owned by the company.

Leon Selk Simmons, a smelter employee, and Arthur Garfield Cameron, a Trail lawyer, created the subdivision as a bedroom community for Trail. Developed as Beaver Heights, the existence of many settlements in BC with "Beaver" as part of their names, prompted the change to Montrose prior to the lot sales by Montrose Homesites Limited. The new name likely arose from Leon's Scottish roots and images of Montrose, Angus, but possibly could have been the name of a rural school in the area which had opened in 1928. Furthermore, the choice was appropriate, because wild roses grew throughout this mountain plateau.

== Growth & access ==
Engvold Melgard and Louis Campeau established a grocery store in 1947. The three-room elementary school opened in 1952. When Beaver Falls lost its post office the next year, Montrose gained one. In 1956, the settlement incorporated as a village. St. Monica’s Anglican opened in 1961, but later the building became a Baptist church.

The Trail–Fruitvale section of Highway 3B, completed in the early 1960s, replaced the rudimentary "cut-off " road, dating from the early 1920s.

== Demographics ==
In the 2021 Census of Population conducted by Statistics Canada, Montrose had a population of 1,013 living in 429 of its 435 total private dwellings, a change of 1.7% from its 2016 population of 996. With a land area of 1.46 km^{2} (0.56 sq mi), it had a population density of 693.8/km^{2} (1,797.0/sq mi) in 2021.

== Economy ==
There is a post office, a Chinese-Canadian restaurant and one combined gasoline station/corner store in the village. Other than home-based businesses, virtually all other employment is based in the nearby city of Trail. Major employers of Montrose residents include Teck, the Kootenay Boundary Regional Hospital, School District 20, Ferraro Foods, and the Trail operations of such large corporations as Fortis BC, Wal-Mart, Extra Foods (Weston Corp), Canadian Tire and international engineering consultants Wood.

Montrose is known throughout the Kootenay region of BC for its excellent drinking water, a sample of which received silver medals in the 2008 and 2009 Berkeley Springs International Water Tasting Competition.

== Features ==
Montrose is also the location of the "Antenna Trail" a 4 kilometre loop hiking trail that rises 250 metres above the village and has views of the Beaver and Columbia Valleys. This trail is part of the Kootenay Columbia Trail system although it is not contiguous with the rest of the trails located near, and accessed from, nearby Rossland. The Antenna Trail is popular because it is snow-free much earlier in the spring than the higher elevation trails, and has little if any mountain bike traffic.

The village shares its territory with a variety of native BC wildlife. Elk, Whitetail Deer, Mule Deer, Black Bears, and Wild Turkeys are frequently spotted on Montrose Mountain, and occasionally within the village proper. Hummingbirds are attracted by the numerous feeders put out by residents, with at least seven different species recorded.
