= Trail Airport =

Trail Regional Airport
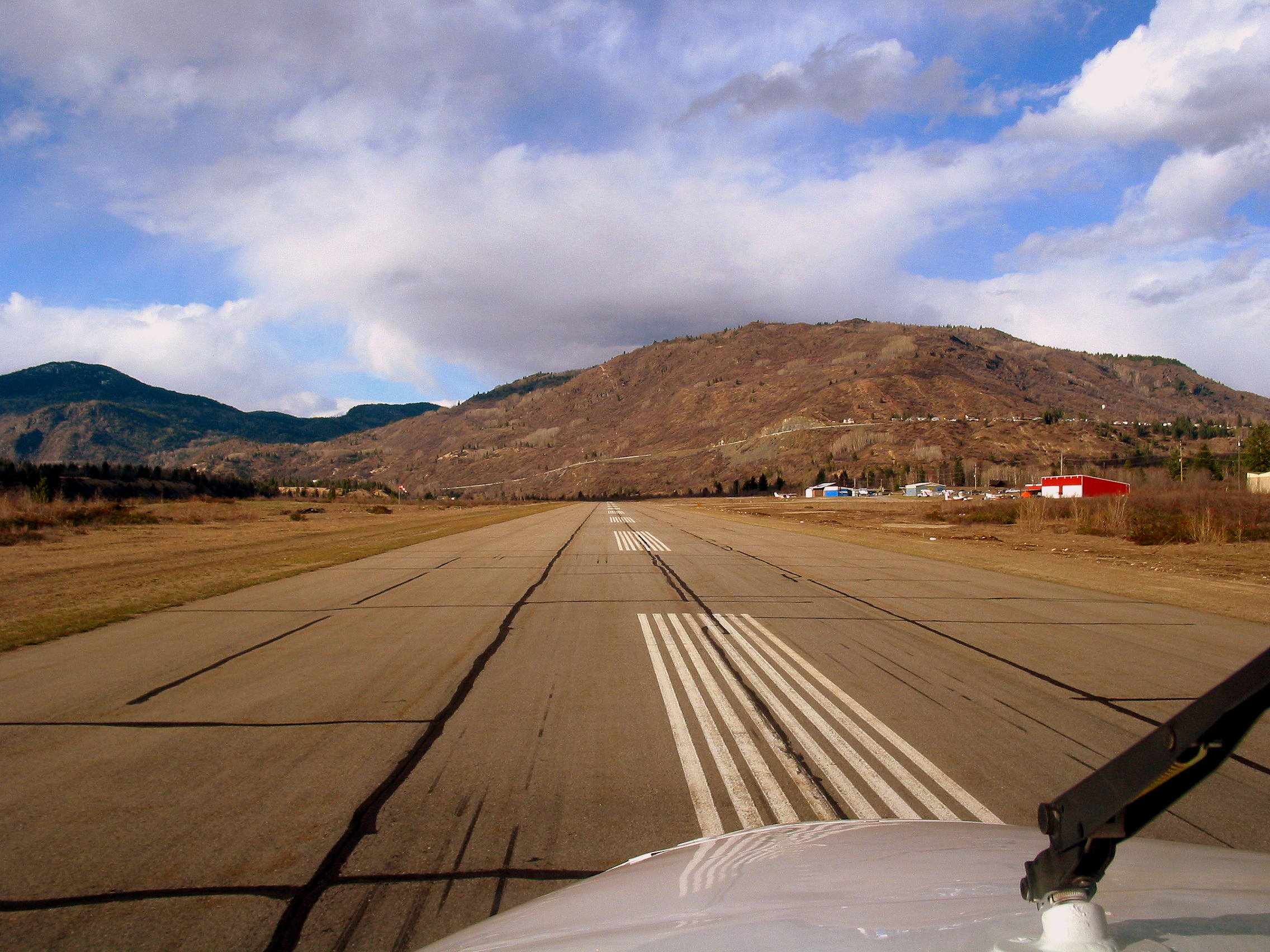
- IATA: YZZ; ICAO: none; TC LID: CAD4

Summary
- Airport type: Public
- Owner/Operator: City of Trail
- Serves: West Kootenay
- Location: Trail, British Columbia
- Time zone: MST (UTC−07:00)
- Elevation AMSL: 1,427 ft (435 m)
- Coordinates: 49°03′36″N 117°36′29″W
- Website: https://trail.ca/en/live/trail-regional-airport.aspx

Map
- Location in British Columbia

Runways
Direction	Length		Surface
Direction	ft	m	Surface
16/34	4,800	1,463	Asphalt
- Source: Canada Flight Supplement

Trail Airport (IATA: YZZ, TC LID: CAD4) is located 6.1 nautical miles (11.3 km; 7.0 mi) southeast of Trail, British Columbia, Canada and is situated in a valley beside the Columbia River. The airport serves both Trail and nearby Nelson and Castlegar.

The airport consists of one 4,800 ft × 75 ft (1,463 m × 23 m) asphalt runway and provides a GPS approach from the north (runway 16) and the south (runway 34).

Since April 10, 2006, Pacific Coastal has been flying into the airport using their Beechcraft 1900s, and occasionally their bigger Saab 340s.

In December 2017, with funding from the B.C. Air Access Program, the City of Trail built a new 390 m^{2} (4,200 sq ft) airport terminal building to give the 22,000+ yearly travellers a better travel experience with designated drop-off and pick-up zones, ample short-term and long-term parking, and a spacious waiting area.

== Airlines and destinations ==
Airlines	Destinations
Pacific Coastal Airlines	Vancouver

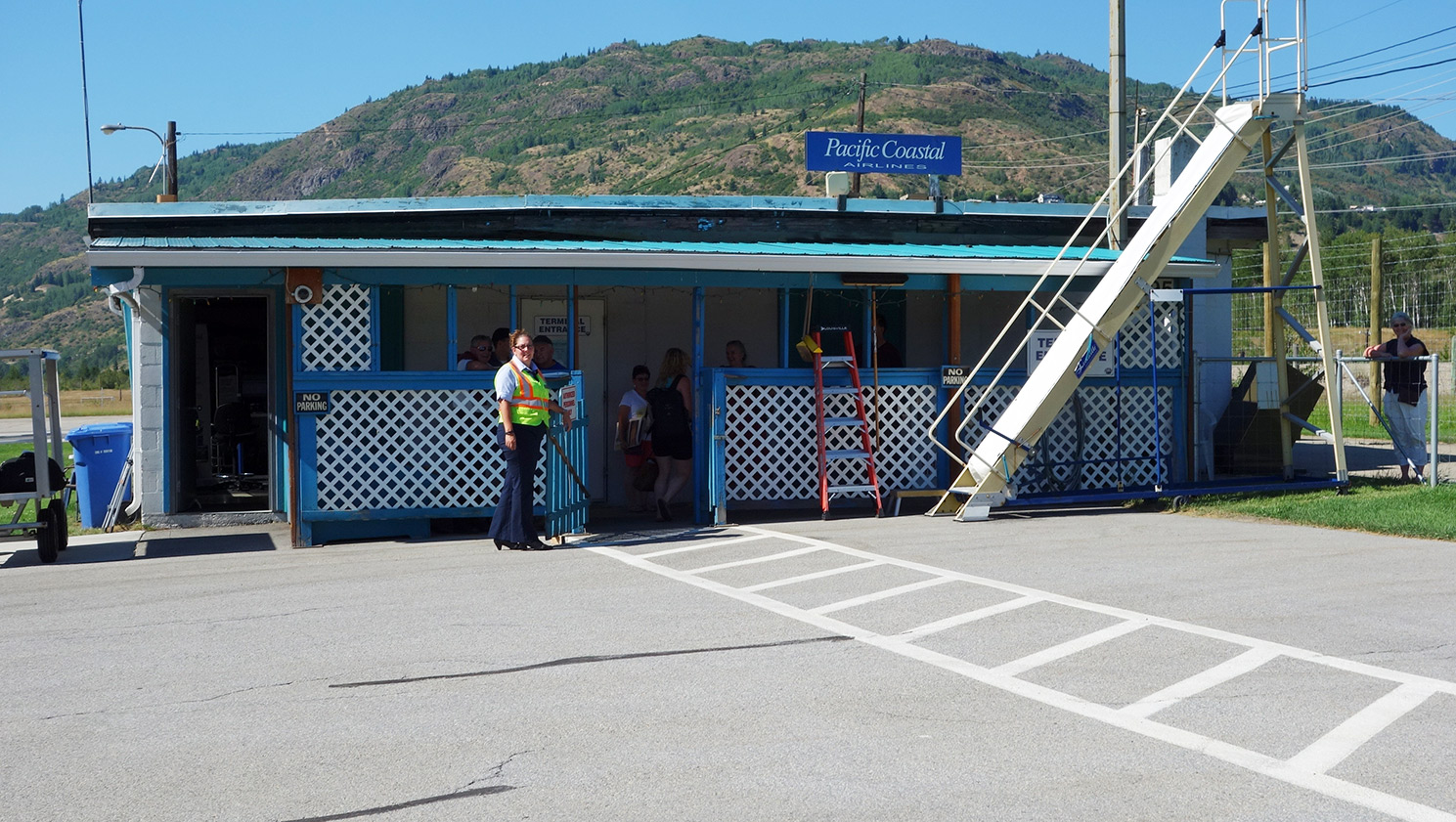
Trail Airport

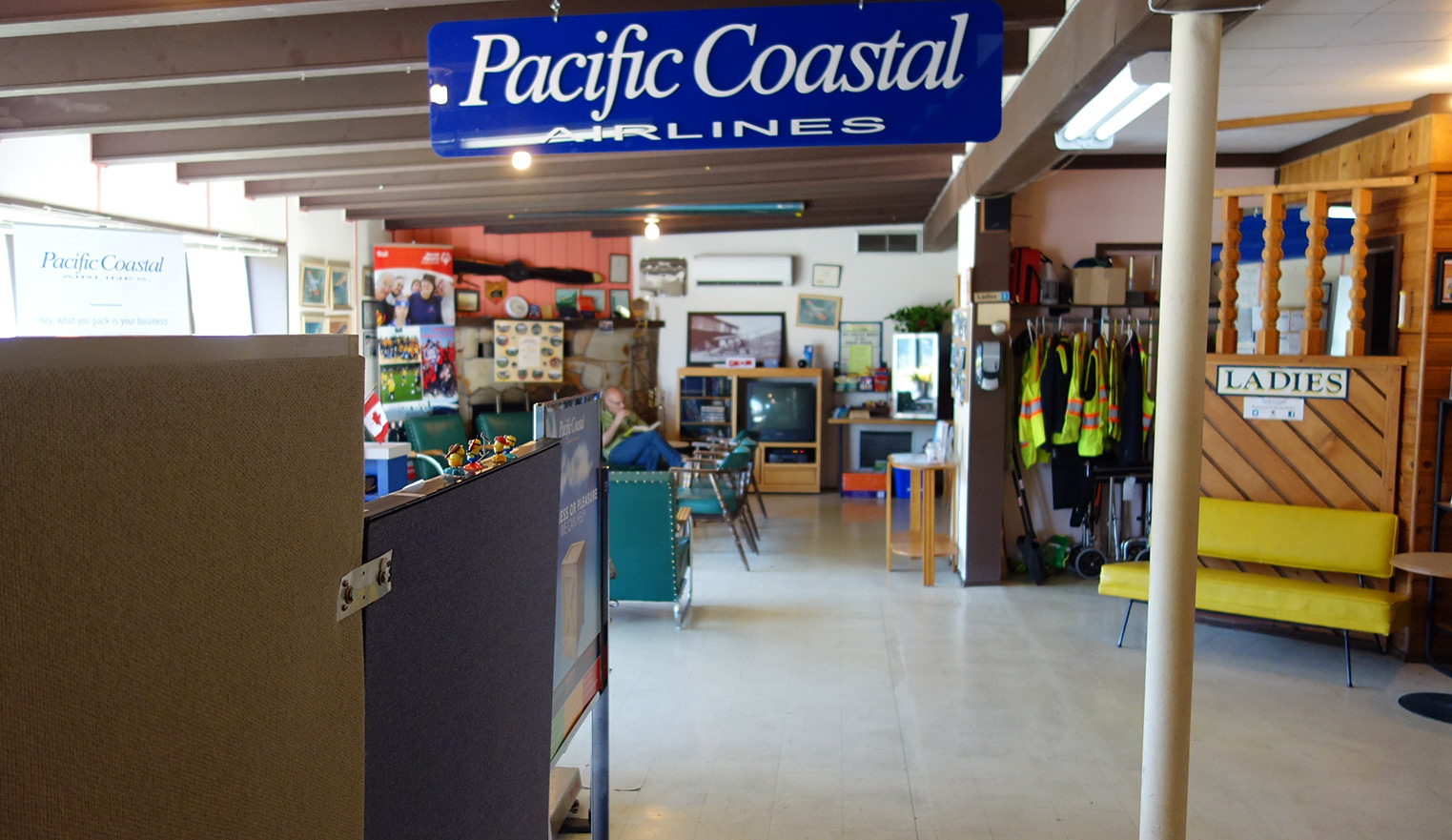
Terminal of Trail Airport
