= Fruitvale, British Columbia =

Fruitvale
- Village
- The Corporation of the Village of Fruitvale
- Main Street, Fruitvale
- Motto: The Heart of the Beaver Valley
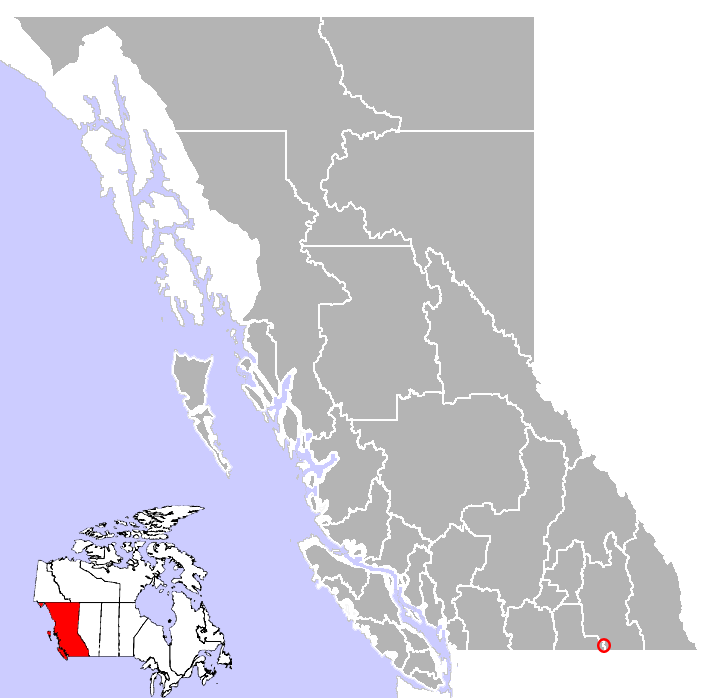
- Location of Fruitvale in British Columbia
- Coordinates: 49°06′56″N 117°32′43″W
- Country: Canada
- Province: British Columbia
- Region: Kootenays
- Regional district: Kootenay Boundary
- Founded: 1907
- Incorporated: 1952

Government
  - Governing body: Fruitvale Village Council
  - Mayor: Catherine Guesford

Area
  - Village: 6.01 km^{2} (2.32 sq mi)
  - Urban: 2.70 km^{2} (1.04 sq mi)
- Elevation: 681 m (2,234 ft)

Population (2021)
  - Village: 1,958
- Time zone: UTC−07:00 (PT)
- Highways: Highway 3B
- Waterways: Beaver Creek
- Website: Village of Fruitvale

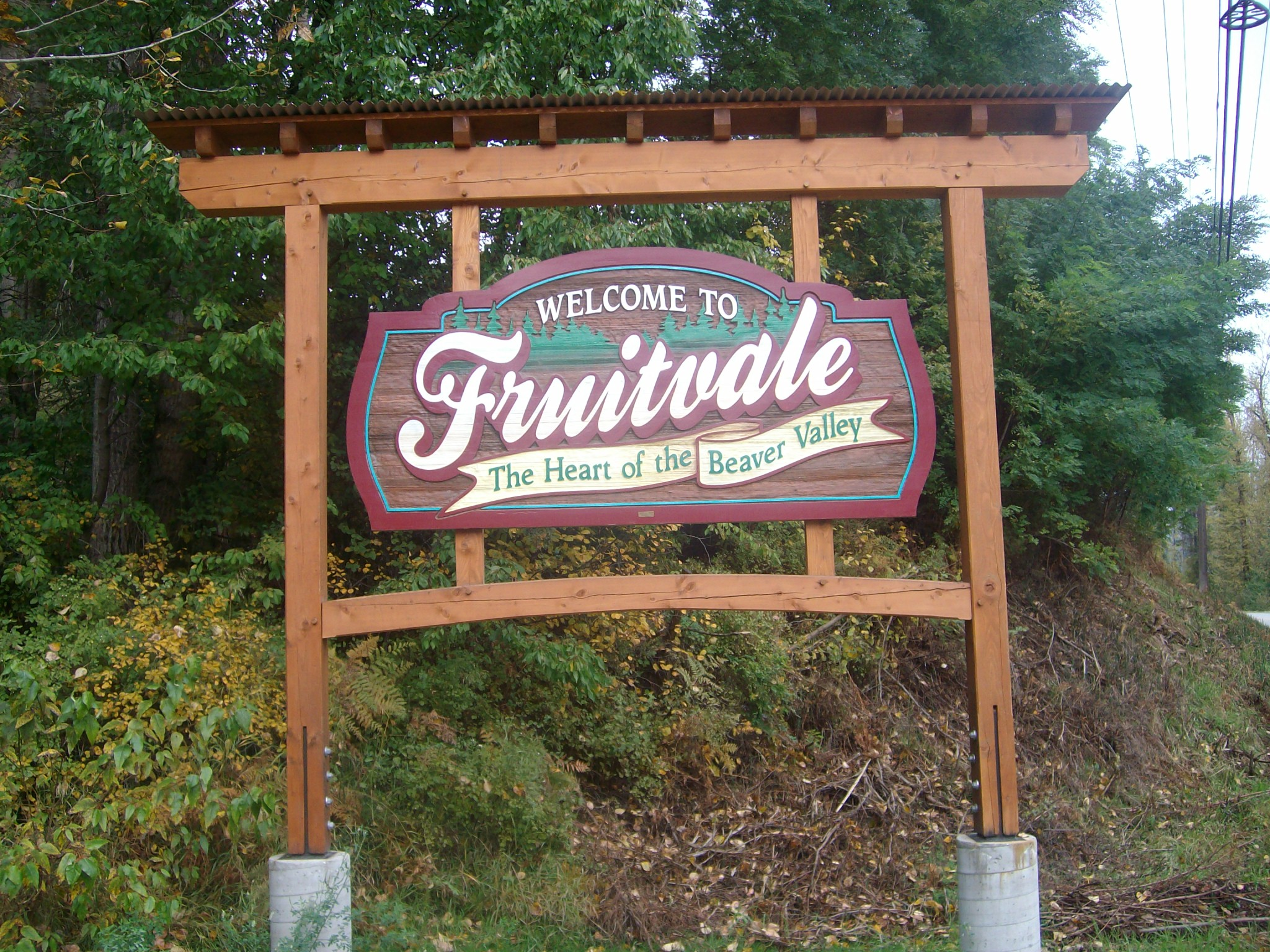
Fruitvale's welcome sign

Fruitvale is a village in the West Kootenay region of southeastern British Columbia. It is 16 km (9.9 mi) east of the city of Trail along Highway 3B.

== Early community ==
One of eight original stations on the Nelson and Fort Sheppard Railway opened in 1893, the location was named Beaver Siding. The name Fruitvale appeared in 1907, promoting a new subdivision. Despite the climate being unsuitable for fruit growing, the settlement prospered and was incorporated as a village in 1952.

== Geography ==
The village of Fruitvale lies in the Beaver Valley, which is made up of Fruitvale, Beaver Falls, and Montrose.

== Demographics ==
In the 2021 Census of Population conducted by Statistics Canada, Fruitvale had a population of 1,958 living in 858 of its 881 total private dwellings, a change of 2% from its 2016 population of 1,920. With a land area of 2.7 km^{2} (1.0 sq mi), it had a population density of 725.2/km^{2} (1,878.2/sq mi) in 2021.

=== Religion ===
According to the 2021 census, religious groups in Fruitvale included:

- Irreligion (1,150 persons or 60.7%)
- Christianity (740 persons or 39.1%)

== Schools ==
Fruitvale Elementary School serves students from kindergarten to grade 7. High school students are bussed to J. Lloyd Crowe Secondary School in nearby Trail. Beaver Valley Middle School (formerly Beaver Valley Junior Secondary ) closed in 2002.

== Sports ==
The KIJHL's Beaver Valley Nitehawks hockey team play in Fruitvale. The village also has facilities for curling, bowling, soccer, golf, and baseball.

Club	League	Sport	Venue	Established	Championships
Beaver Valley Nitehawks	KIJHL	Ice Hockey	Beaver Valley Arena	1981	7

== Notable people ==
- Adam Deadmarsh, former NHL player – Colorado Avalanche and Los Angeles Kings
- Barret Jackman, 2003 NHL Rookie of the Year
- Laci J. Mailey, actress – Falling Skies, Chesapeake Shores
- Ella Matteucci, ice hockey player – Markham Thunder (CWHL) and PWHPA
- Paul Moller, inventor of the Skycar
