= VF2590 =

Radio station in Revelstoke, British Columbia

Coordinates: 50.9976°N 118.1953°W

- Revelstoke, British Columbia; Canada
- Frequency: 92.5 MHz
- Branding: Stoke FM/Big Mountain Radio

Programming
- Format: Community

Ownership
- Owner: Stoke FM Radio Society

History
- First air date: 2011

Technical information
- ERP: 4 watts
- HAAT: -108.3 metres

Links
- Website: stokefm.com

VF2590 is a radio station which broadcasts a community radio format at 92.5 FM in Revelstoke, British Columbia, Canada. The station is branded as Stoke FM/Big Mountain Radio.

== History ==
On October 26, 2011, Stoke FM Radio Society received approval from the Canadian Radio-television and Telecommunications Commission (CRTC) to operate a new low-power developmental community FM radio station at Revelstoke with an effective radiated power with just 4 watts. In 2016, the station received approval to convert its license from the developmental radio class to a regular full-time radio station.
