= Boundary–Waneta Border Crossing =

Border crossing between Canada and the United States

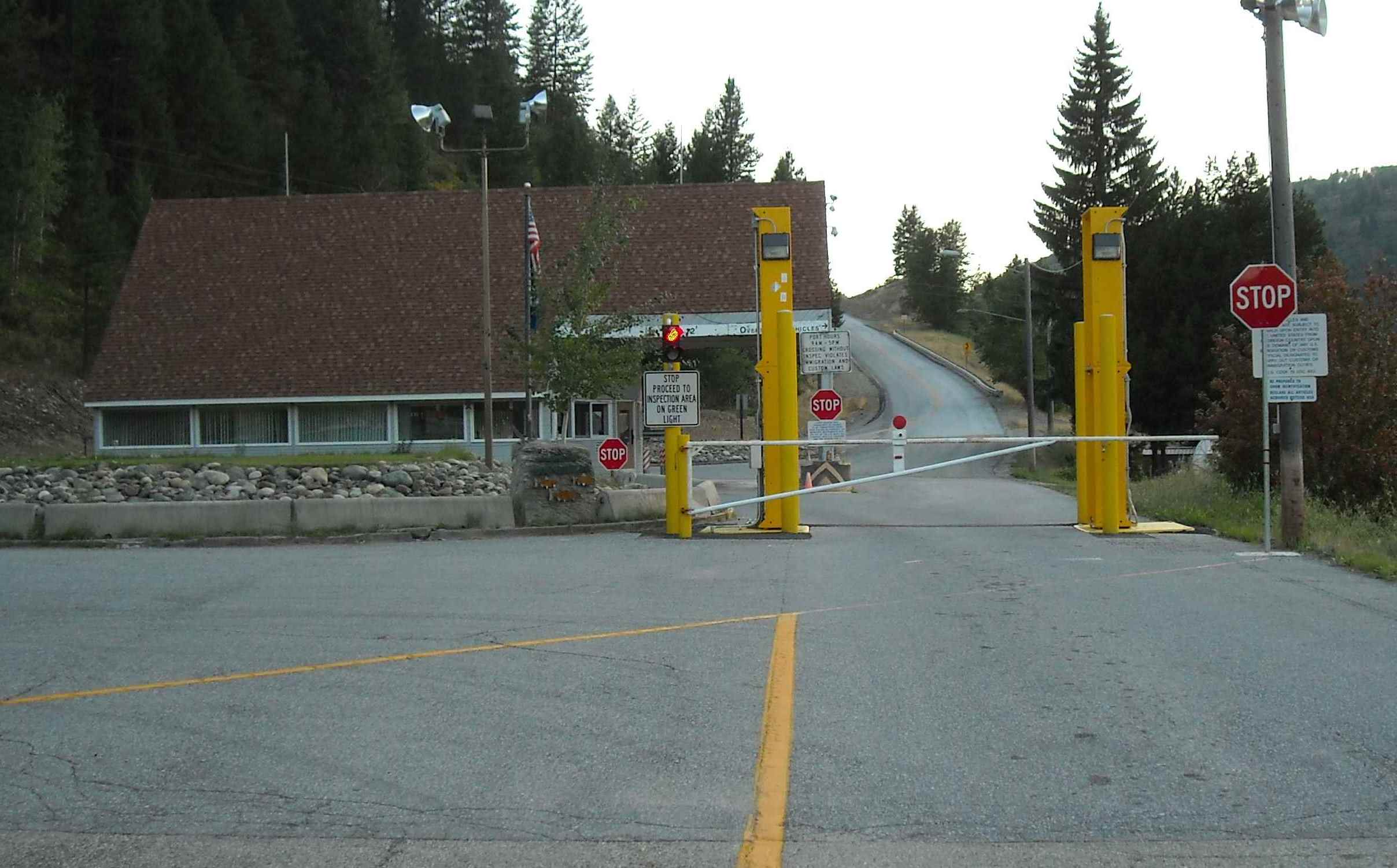
- Former US Border Inspection Station at Boundary, Washington as seen in 2009

Locaiton
- Country: United States; Canada
- Location: Highway 22A / Waneta Road; US Port:5338 Northport Waneta Road, Colville, Washington 99114; Canadian Port:10290 Highway 22A, Salmo, British Columbia V0G 1Z0
- Coordinates: 49.000742°N 117.62505°W

Details
- Opened: 1865

Website
- http://www.cbp.gov/contact/ports/oroville-wa

The Boundary–Waneta Border Crossing connects the town of Northport, Washington with Trail, British Columbia on the Canada–US border. Access is via Waneta Road (formerly Washington State Route 251) on the American side and British Columbia Highway 22A on the Canadian side.

== Boat and train inspection ==
A customs office has operated at or near this crossing since 1865, initially by the Colony of British Columbia to inspect vessels arriving via the Columbia River, and after 1871 by the federal government of British Canada, additionally to inspect trains with the completion of the Nelson and Fort Sheppard Railway (N&FS) in 1893.

== Fort Sheppard ==
The N&FS had misspelled Fort Shepherd (at this BC location, but on the opposite bank of the Columbia). In 1892, a hotel and restaurant were built, and the surveyed townsite advertised as Kootenay City. After correcting survey errors that placed some lots south of the border, the development was relaunched as Fort Sheppard in 1893. The separate towns of Waneta and Fort Sheppard, north and south of the railway bridge across the mouth of the Pend-d'Oreille River, merged into the former after a few years, and Boundary City appeared on the US side. The Fort Sheppard Hotel, having been abandoned three decades, was demolished in the early 1950s.

== Waneta ==
Waneta Landing was also in use. The earliest newspaper mention (May 1892) of Waneta was with respect to the Kootenai Placer Mining Co. and the associated Kootenai Hydraulic Mining Co., which were based in the settlement. The principals were from Rochester, New York, where Waneta Lake was about 75 miles (120 km) south. That Waneta supposedly derived from the daughter of a Seneca chief. A different Wanata was a Yanktonai chief. If a First Nations link was more local, the meanings attributed to the name have included shape-shifter, rushing waters, burned area, and rolling waves. Even a presumed old English meaning of pale-skinned has been proposed. A November 1892 newspaper reference called the place Juanita, a diminutive of Juana, a female Spanish name. Reputedly, Juanita was an influential lady of the night residing in the community. A May 1893 mention used both Waneta and Juanita. The 1897 Year Book of British Columbia stated that Waneta was a corruption of Juaneta.

== Vehicle inspection ==
A border crossing for motor vehicles was created in 1945, when the railway built a new bridge parallel to the existing one, which was repurposed for single lane vehicle traffic. The first border inspection stations for motor vehicles were opened on the Canadian side in 1975, and the US in 1978. In 2013, the US built a new border station a few hundred yards south of the original facility.

== See also ==
- List of Canada–United States border crossings
