= Kootenays =

- Region of British Columbia
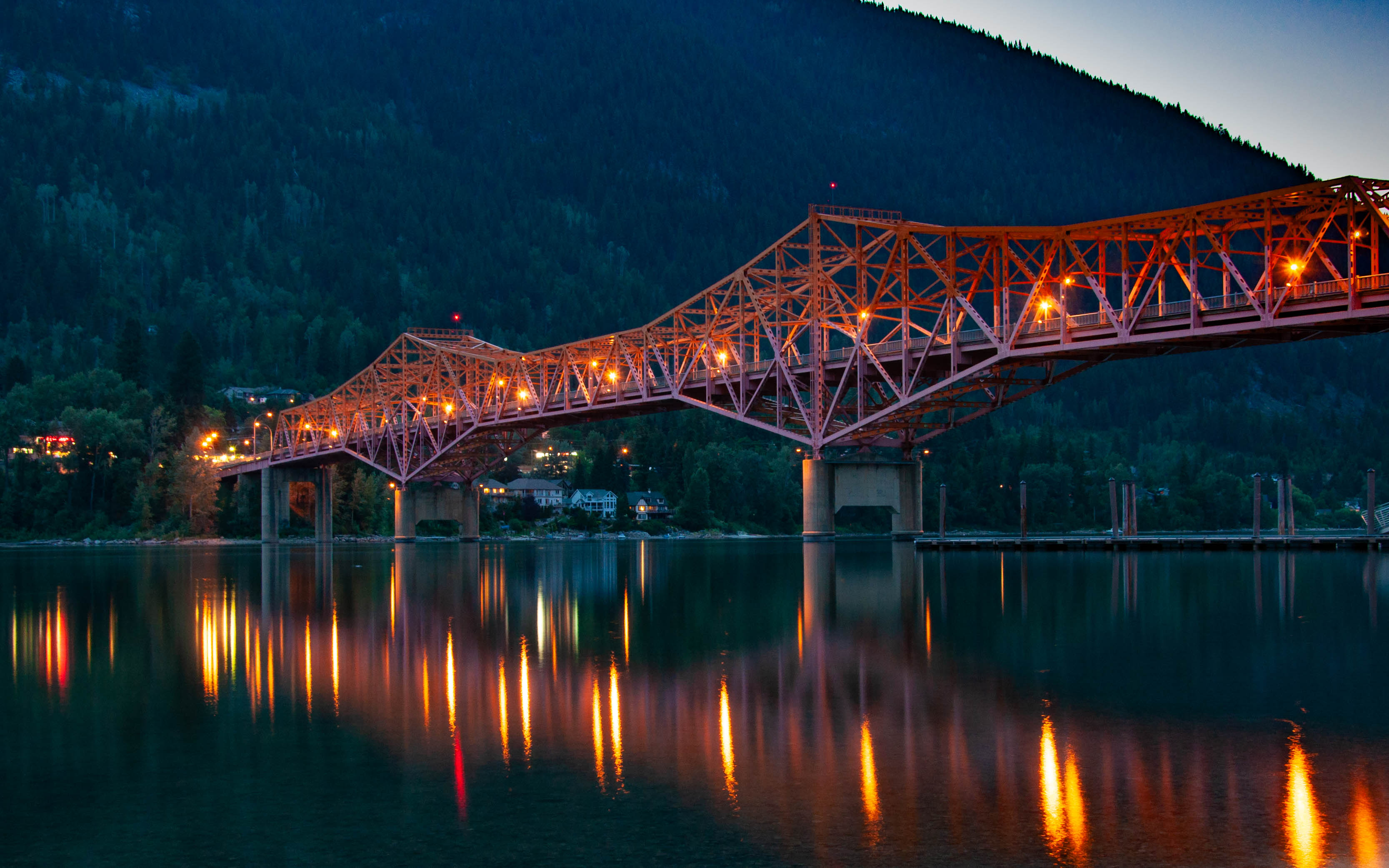
- Nelson Bridge in Central Kootenay

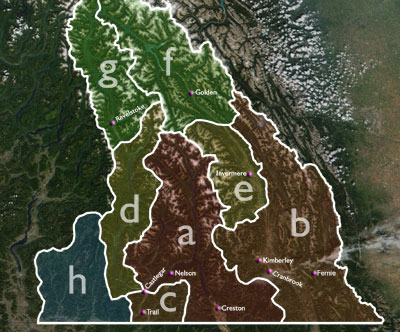
- Various interpretations of the boundaries of the Kootenays

- Location within British Columbia
- Coordinates: 50°30′N 116°30′W
- Country: Canada
- Province: British Columbia
- Principal cities: List: Cranbrook; Salmo; Nelson; Castlegar; Trail; Revelstoke

Area
  - 4 Districts: 86,649 km^{2} (33,455 sq mi)

Population (2016)
  - Total: 202,769
- Time zone: UTC−08:00 (PST Mountain Time Zone (MST))
  - Summer (DST): UTC−07:00 (PDT)
- Postal code prefixes: V

The Kootenays or Kootenay (/ˈkuːtni/ KOOT-nee) is a region of southeastern British Columbia. It takes its name from the Kootenay River, which in turn was named for the Kutenai First Nations people.

== Boundaries ==
The Kootenays are more or less defined by the Kootenay Land District, though some variation exists in terms of what areas are or are not a part. The strictest definition of the region is the drainage basin of the lower Kootenay River from its re-entry into Canada near Creston, through to its confluence with the Columbia at Castlegar (illustrated by a, right). In most interpretations, however, the region also includes:

- an area to the east which encompasses the upper drainage basin of the Kootenay River from its rise in the Rocky Mountains to its passage into the United States at Newgate. This adds a region spanning from the Purcell Mountains to the Alberta border, and includes Rocky Mountain Trench cities such as Cranbrook and Kimberley and the Elk Valley of the southern Canadian Rockies, centred on Fernie. This region also includes part of the Flathead River drainage basin. (illustrated by b)
- an area to the southwest encompassing the Columbia's drainage from the Kootenay confluence south to the U.S. Border plus the Salmo River basin. This adds the communities of Rossland, Castlegar, Fruitvale and Salmo (illustrated by c)

Some or all of the following areas to the north, which drain into the Columbia River, are also commonly included in the Kootenays:

- The Arrow Lakes area, which adds Nakusp. (illustrated by d)
- The Upper Columbia Valley, which parallels the first section of the Kootenay River, including the communities of Invermere and Radium Hot Springs (illustrated by e)
- The Columbia drainage between the Kicking Horse Pass and the Rogers Pass, in and around the town of Golden. (illustrated by f)
- The Columbia drainage between the Rogers Pass and the Eagle Pass, in and around the town of Revelstoke. (illustrated by g)

When the above regions are added, sometimes the region's name is morphed into Columbia-Kootenay or Kootenay-Columbia, although that terminology also includes the Big Bend Country and Kinbasket Lake, to the north of Golden and Revelstoke, which is not generally considered part of the Kootenays, though part of the Kootenay Land District.

Finally, the Boundary Country, a southern east–west corridor between the Okanagan and the Bonanza Pass and drained by the basins of the Kettle and Granby Rivers, is sometimes mentioned as being in the West Kootenay, and in other reckonings as being part of the Okanagan. In actuality, the settlement of the Boundary Country predates development in either of the regions it is now attached to, as is also the case with the Similkameen Country to the west of the Okanagan. In some descriptions, the Boundary Country includes Osoyoos and Oliver in the South Okanagan (rather than the other way around). The Boundary Country is (illustrated by h) In the event of its inclusion, the Kootenays could be described as the complete Canadian portion of the Columbia Basin minus lands drained by the Okanagan River.

== Naming and subdivision ==
Contingent on the above boundaries, the Kootenays are commonly split either into East and West, or East, Central and West. In general use amongst locals of the area, the "East/West" convention is more common as a descriptor of where someone is from or where a town is located (rather than splitting the region into "East/Central/West" subregions). That being said:

- The usual East-West separator is the Purcell Mountains, a range running north–south through the region. Areas to the east of this range are deemed to be in "East Kootenay" or the "East Kootenays" while places west of this division are in "West Kootenay" or the "West Kootenays".
- The usual East-Central-West separators are the Purcell Mountains splitting East from Central and the Selkirk Mountains splitting Central from West.

It remains unclear why both Kootenay and Kootenays are used somewhat interchangeably to describe the area. The plural form is in reference to The Kootenays, both East and West; the singular is in reference to the Kootenay Region. In practice the two terms are used interchangeably, although one indicates a geographical region and the other a legal boundary, the Kootenay Land District, which was identical with the original federal and provincial Kootenay ridings.

== Economy ==
Once settled by miners, loggers, and rail workers, the area experienced a silver rush in the 1890s. The district now contains important tourism, outdoor activity and fruit-growing regions (Creston Valley) and numerous commercial centres, including Grand Forks, Kaslo, Robson, Ymir, Warfield, Montrose, Fruitvale, Salmo, Trail, Nelson, Slocan, Playmor, Winlaw, Cranbrook, Kimberley, Fernie, Castlegar, Rossland, Erickson, and Creston.

The region has a large network of outdoor activity operators, with the biggest facilities including lift, cat and heliskiing. This includes some of the oldest resorts in North America, such as Red Mountain, and largest Revelstoke Mountain. The highway that connects them all has been named the Powder Highway.

With the emergence of fibre internet, digital nomads and technology developers are now a growing part of the economy. Several coworking and innovation centres have sprouted including Kootenay Lake Innovation Centre.

A number of community radio stations exist in the region, most notably CJLY-FM in Nelson, CIDO-FM in Creston and Stoke FM in Revelstoke. These stations usually operate either as cooperatives or as nonprofit organization. Since 2001, The Kootenay Mountain Culture has brought the bioregion together under one magazine. It covers a range of topics including outdoor adventure, environmental issues, arts and culture, local events, and profiles of people living in the region.

== See also ==
- Kootenay National Park
- Kootenay (disambiguation)
- List of provincial parks of the Kootenays
- Waxhaws
