= Rossland, British Columbia =

Rossland
- City
- The Corporation of the City of Rossland
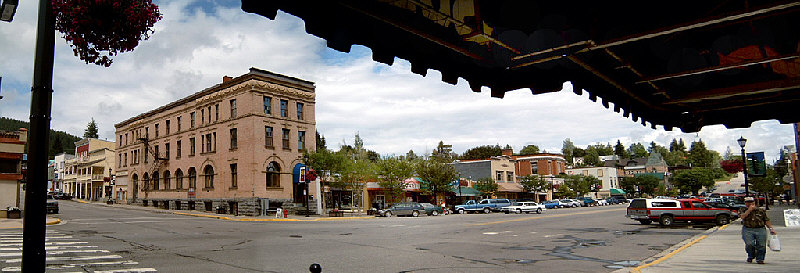
- Rossland's main street
- Nickname: The Golden City
- Location of Rossland in British Columbia
- Coordinates: 49°04′43″N 117°47′57″W
- Country: Canada
- Province: British Columbia
- Region: West Kootenay
- Regional district: Kootenay Boundary
- Incorporated: 1897

Government
  - Type: Elected city council
  - Governing body: Rossland City Council
  - Mayor: Andy Morel

Area
  - Total: 59.79 km^{2} (23.09 sq mi)
- Elevation: 1,023 m (3,356 ft)

Population (2021)
  - Total: 4,140
  - Density: 62.4/km^{2} (162/sq mi)
- Time zone: UTC−07:00 (PT)
- Postal code: V0G 1Y0
- Area codes: 250, 778, 236, 672
- Highways: Highway 3B; Highway 22
- Website: rossland.ca

Rossland is in the West Kootenay region of south central British Columbia. High in the Monashee Mountains, the city lies immediately east of the intersections of BC highways 3B and 22. The facilities provide a winter base for the nearby multi-peak ski hills of the Red Mountain Resort. In the non-winter months Rossland is frequented by mountain bikers, with golf and fishing options nearby as well.

== History ==
=== Name origin ===
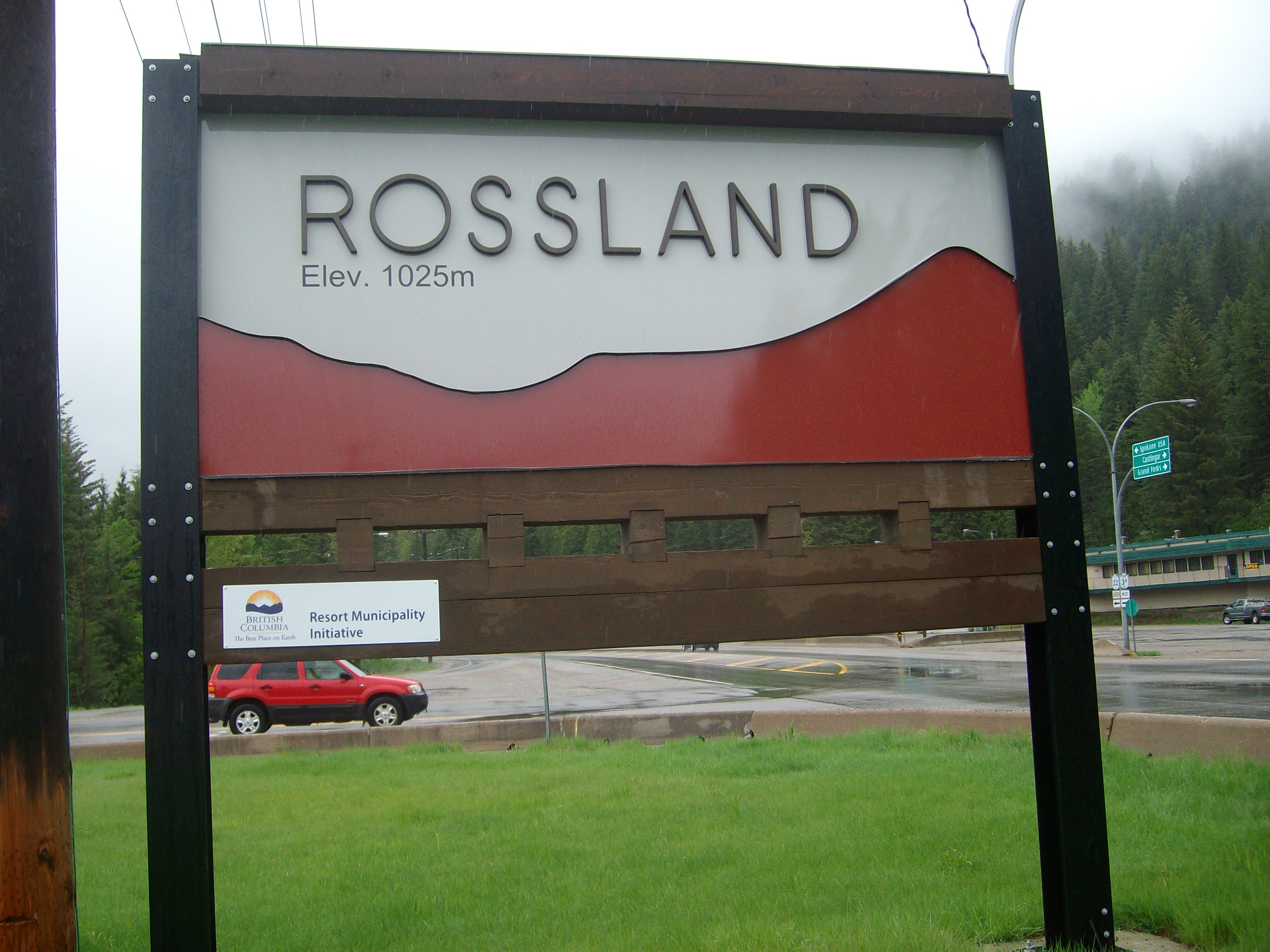
Welcome for Rossland, BC

The Sinixt First Nation called the Rossland area kEluwi'sst or kmarkn. As to the word meanings, suggestions have included an "important temporary camp" or "up in the hills" for the former, and "smooth top" for the latter, referring to Red Mountain. Once mining claims were staked, the area became known as Trail Creek camp, the creek name derived from the Dewdney Trail.

The final naming acknowledged Ross Thompson, who preempted 160 acres in 1892. He subdivided the land into lots in 1894 to become the townsite of Thompson. A few months later, the name changed to Rossland. The postal authorities may have requested the amendment to avoid confusion with similarly named places.

=== First claims ===
In July 1890, partners Joe Bourjouis and Joe Morris staked claims on Red Mountain, but the assays were disappointing. Since an individual could register only two claims, the pair paid the $2.50 per claim to register the Center Star, War Eagle, Idaho and Virginia. For $10, they gave their Le Wise claim to the Deputy Recorder of Mines, "Colonel" Eugene Sayre Topping, to register for himself as Le Roi. Leaving government service, Topping joined a Spokane syndicate that purchased 53 per cent of the property from him for $16,000 that November. The following spring, several tons of ore went by mule down the mountain and along the Dewdney Trail to Trail Creek Landing at the creek mouth. Following boat transport to Little Dalles, Washington, the Spokane Falls and Northern Railway (SF&N), and connecting lines, railed the product to the Colorado Smelting and Mining Company Works at Butte, Montana.

=== Wagon roads & deals ===
During 1891, a patchwork of mines operated on the mountain, Le Roi Mining and Smelting Company was incorporated, and Topping sold his remaining interest for $30,000. Late the next year, a ferry across the river from the SF&N station at Northport, Washington connected with Oliver Durant's new wagon road from Red Mountain. A fleet of 40 wagons to Northport largely replaced the mule trains to Trail. That year, Bourjouis and Morris sold their Center Star and War Eagle mines, which with the Le Roi, produced 96 per cent of the mountain's 1,500,000 tons of ore to 1903. In 1893, an 3-metre (11 ft) wide wagon road was graded along Trail Creek, to win back traffic for Trail. The mountain output of 18,500 tons in 1894 increased ten-fold the next year.

=== Early railways & consolidation ===
In June 1896, the first loaded ore train ran along the initial section of Heinze's Columbia and Western Railway (C&W) from Red Mountain to the Trail smelter arbitration (1938–1942). After a delay over a US right-of-way, Corbin's Red Mountain–Northport railway, comprising the Red Mountain Railway (RMR) (BC section) and Columbia & Red Mountain Railway (C&RM) (WA section), opened in December 1896. The next year, Le Roi's contract to exclusively supply the Trail smelter expired. When Le Roi owners opened the Northport smelter in January 1898, competition further intensified. That March, Canadian Pacific Railway (CP) purchased the C&W and Trail smelter. That July, the Northern Pacific Railway (NP) acquired the RMR, C&RM, and Northport smelter. That August, British America Corporation completed its purchase of Le Roi holdings.

=== Early community ===
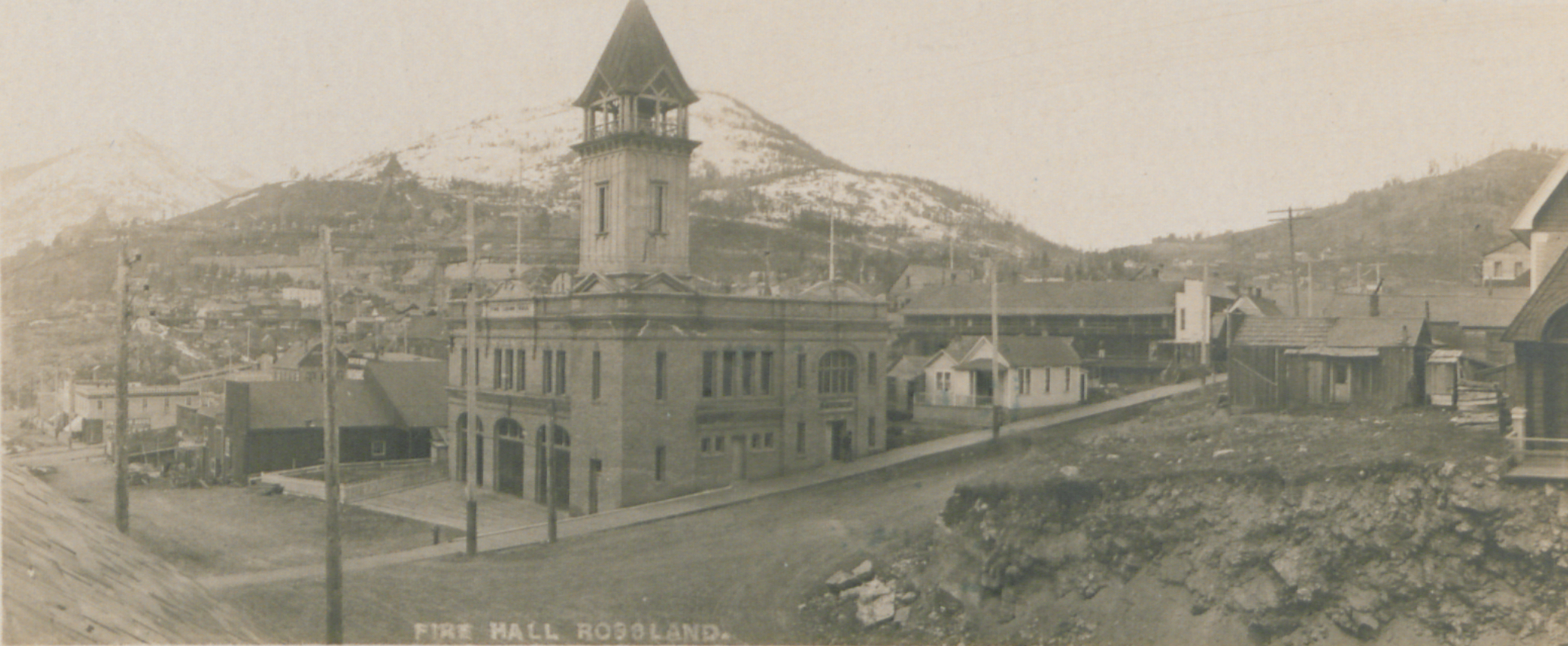
Fire Hall, Rossland, 1909

Since miners did not own the land upon which their tents or shacks stood, many acquired freehold lots in town for permanent residences. In February 1895, the first edition of the Rossland Record listed a blacksmith, a tinsmith, a cobbler, a customs agent, a baker, a land surveyor, a lawyer, two sawyers, two barbers, three doctors, four bartenders, four hoteliers, and a justice of the peace. Months later, strict John (Jack) Kirkup became the constable. A ten-passenger coach ran to Trail Creek Landing. Presbyterian, Methodist and Roman Catholic churches, and a school, were soon established. In January 1896, a small electricity generator came on line, and was later upgraded. In 1898, West Kootenay Power became the supplier from Bonnington Falls dam.

In March 1897, Rossland became a city. The eight doctors, 17 legal firms, and 42 saloons served an estimated 7,000 residents. This peak aligned with the 1901 census count of 6,000. A string of newspapers followed, the Rossland Miner being the most enduring. The fire of August 1902 consumed both sides of upper Spokane Street, leaving only the old International Hotel standing. A December 1905 explosion wrecked roofs and shattered windows. The fires of January 1927, and March 1929, levelled the wooden buildings of Columbia Street. Depleting mines, World War I, and the Great Depression shrank the population.

=== Early Map ===
- "Rossland map". geography.ua.edu. 1909.

=== Mining diminishes ===
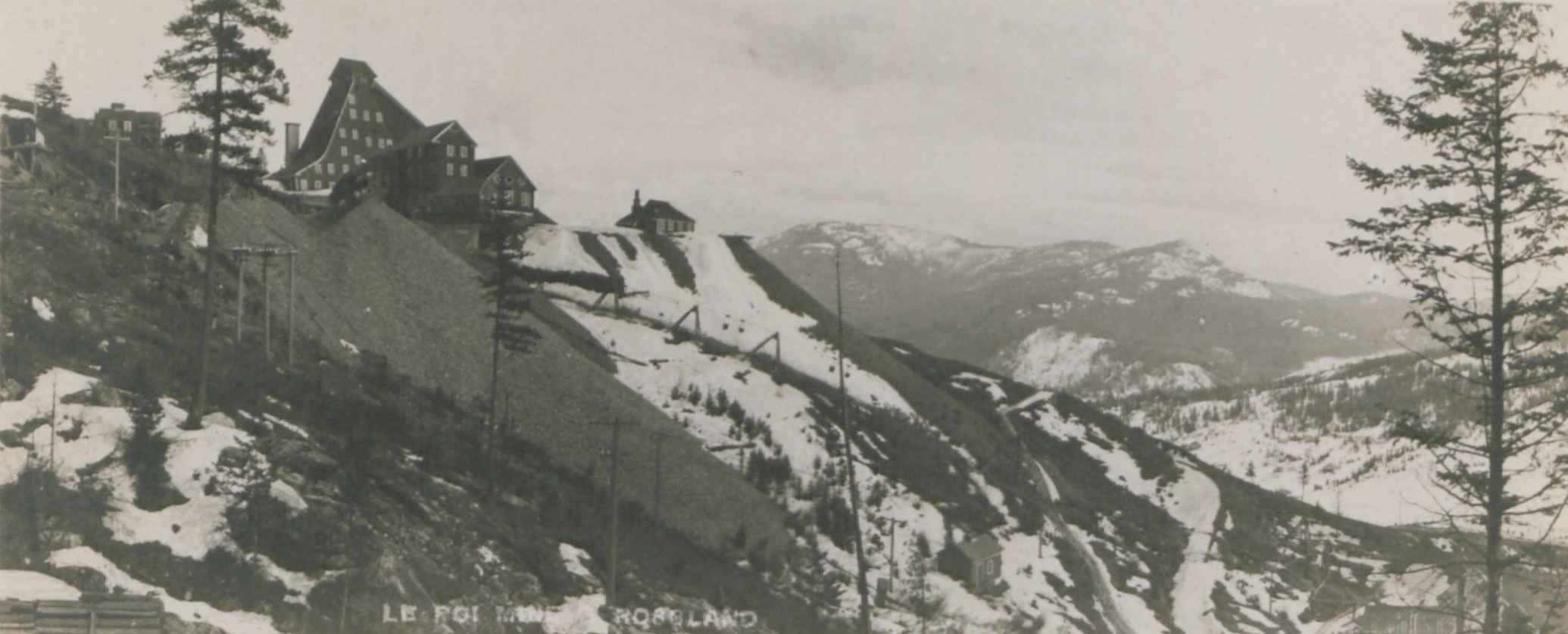
Le Roi Mine, Rossland, 1909

Industrial disputes, strikes and lockouts plagued the mines. Whenever possible, mine owners substituted non-union labour. Militant unions achieved an 8-hour workday in 1899, and protection of unions and their members in subsequent years. Collapsing copper prices, making mine operations unviable, compelled workers to trade job security for wage rollbacks in 1907.

In 1906, the Consolidated Mining and Smelting Company of Canada (CM&S), a consortium comprising the smelter and several Red Mountain mines at Rossland, was formed. CP had a 54 per cent holding. In 1911, CM&S bought Le Roi mine, gaining a virtual monopoly over mountain ore. Under new owners, the Northport smelter worked part-time during World War I, permanently closing in 1921. Service frequency on the railway line to Northport diminished during this period, with the last run in July 1921, and abandonment the next year.

=== Later facilities ===
When Le Roi mine closed in 1929, big ore trains ceased on the CP Rossland–Trail section. About 60 independent properties remained in operation on the mountain. In 1933, 10,000 tons were extracted, reducing to 335 tons in 1937. World War II ended mining on the mountain. By then, Rossland had become a bedroom community for Trail. Highway improvements ended rail passenger service with Trail in 1936. However, the three times a week freight train continued. Frequency progressively reduced until the line was lifted in 1966. In 1951, CP rebuilt the original station, but this replacement was demolished in 1973.

Formerly the only access was Highway 22, with Trail northeastward, and the US border southward. In 1964, Highway 3A opened northward, with paving the following year.

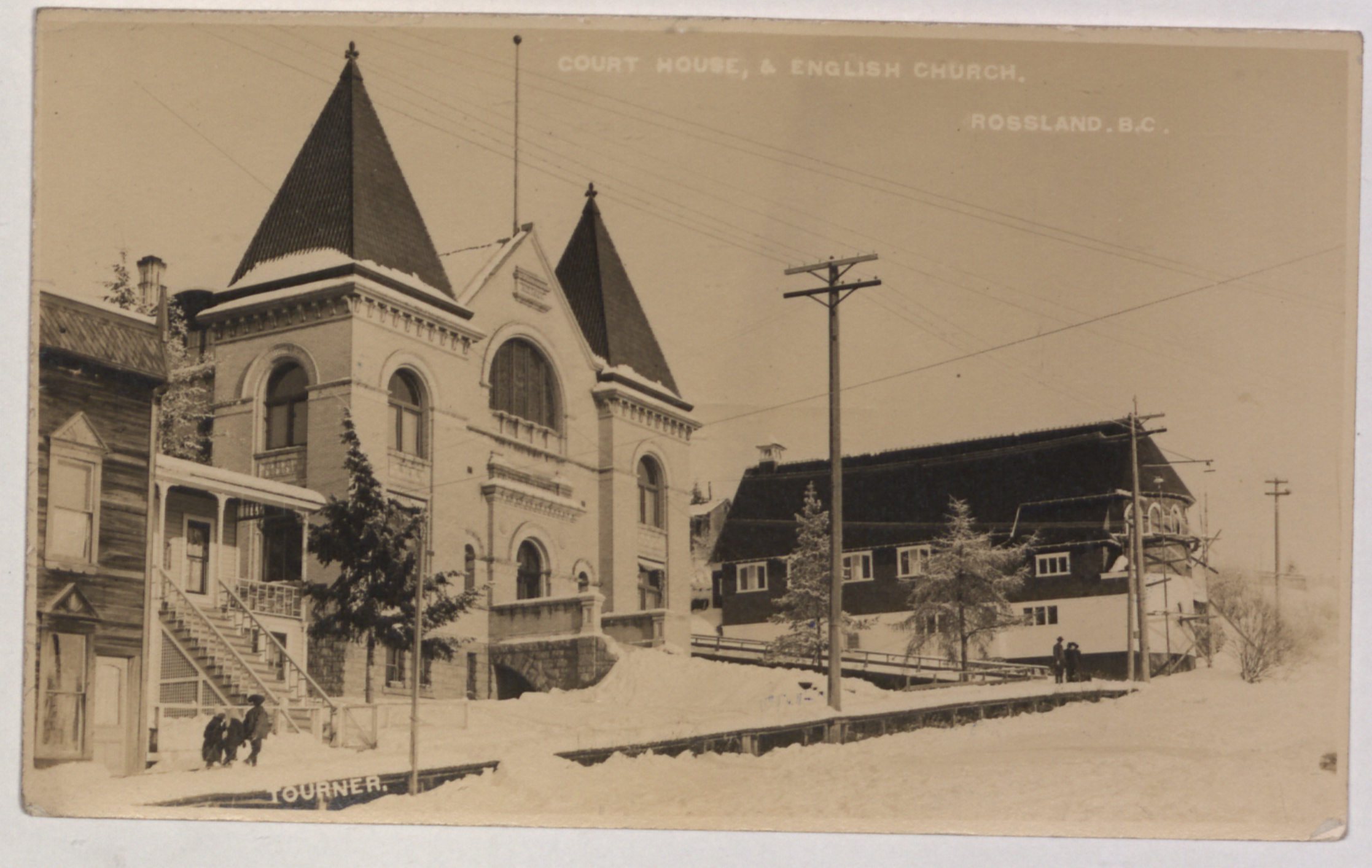
Court House and English Church, Rossland, 1910

== Demographics ==
In the 2021 Census of Population conducted by Statistics Canada, Rossland had a population of 4,140 living in 1,803 of its 2,075 total private dwellings, a change of 11% from its 2016 population of 3,729. With a land area of 59.72 km^{2} (23.06 sq mi), it had a population density of 69.3/km^{2} (179.5/sq mi) in 2021.

=== Ethnicity ===
Panethnic groups in the City of Rossland (2001−2021)
Panethnic group	2021		2016		2011		2006		2001	
Panethnic group	Pop.	%	Pop.	%	Pop.	%	Pop.	%	Pop.	%
European (Note: Statistic includes all persons that did not make up part of a visible minority or an indigenous identity.)	3,835	92.74%	3,420	91.94%	3,415	97.02%	3,080	94.77%	3,420	94.87%
Indigenous	115	2.78%	115	3.09%	35	0.99%	100	3.08%	110	3.05%
East Asian (Note: Statistic includes total responses of "Chinese", "Korean", and "Japanese" under visible minority section on census.)	80	1.93%	85	2.28%	35	0.99%	45	1.38%	25	0.69%
Southeast Asian (Note: Statistic includes total responses of "Filipino" and "Southeast Asian" under visible minority section on census.)	45	1.09%	80	2.15%	25	0.71%	0	0%	10	0.28%
South Asian	40	0.97%	15	0.4%	0	0%	0	0%	20	0.55%
Latin American	15	0.36%	0	0%	0	0%	0	0%	0	0%
African	0	0%	20	0.54%	0	0%	0	0%	0	0%
Middle Eastern (Note: Statistic includes total responses of "West Asian" and "Arab" under visible minority section on census.)	0	0%	0	0%	0	0%	0	0%	10	0.28%
Other/multiracial (Note: Statistic includes total responses of "Visible minority, n.i.e." and "Multiple visible minorities" under visible minority section on census.)	0	0%	0	0%	0	0%	20	0.62%	15	0.42%
Total responses	4,135	99.88%	3,720	99.76%	3,520	98.99%	3,250	99.15%	3,605	98.88%
Total population	4,140	100%	3,729	100%	3,556	100%	3,278	100%	3,646	100%
Note: Totals greater than 100% due to multiple origin responses.

=== Religion ===
According to the 2021 census, religious groups in Rossland included:

- Irreligion (2,930 persons or 70.9%)
- Christianity (1,085 persons or 26.2%)
- Judaism (35 persons or 0.8%)
- Buddhism (10 persons or 0.2%)
- Other (60 persons or 1.5%)

== Economy ==
The attraction of Red Mountain Resort brings thousands of tourists to Rossland.

The town is serviced by the Trail BC airport. It is nearer to Spokane WA than Vancouver BC.

== Attractions ==
Various historic buildings and facilities exist. These include:

- Miners’ Union Hall (1898) is one of the first union halls built in the province.
- Court House (1901) was designated a National Historic Site of Canada.
- Rossland Museum & Discovery Centre, on five acres of the old plant site, displays former workings and mining equipment.
- Bank of Montreal (1898) is the most prominent building in the Downtown core. It is currently an office building with an engineering company (CIMA+ Canada) occupying the main banking hall.

== Notable people ==
- Nicole Coenen, lumberjack, videographer, influencer, and author
- Dallas Drake, retired NHL Hockey player, Stanley Cup champion (Detroit Red Wings)
- Nancy Greene, alpine ski racer, two-time overall World Cup champion (1967, 1968), Olympic Gold medalist and senator
- George Grey, Cross country skier, Olympian
- Kerrin Lee-Gartner, downhill ski racer, Olympic Gold Medalist
- Seth Martin, former hockey player (St. Louis Blues, Trail Smoke Eaters)
- John Stark, stage actor
- Donald Stevens, retired downhill skier
- John Turner, 17th Canadian Prime Minister, grew up in Rossland after moving to Canada from England as an infant with his family
- Joe Zanussi, retired NHL hockey player (St. Louis Blues, Boston Bruins, New York Rangers, Winnipeg Jets)

== Media ==
Rossland was home to CHLI-FM, Rossland Radio Co-op, an internet-based community radio station which was granted, a low-power FM license with the Canadian Radio-television and Telecommunications Commission (CRTC) at 101.1 FM but went off the air in 2013.

Rossland is served by two newspapers. One is The Rossland Telegraph, an online-only paper, founded in August 2008. In July 2010 the "Rossland News" was opened and is both online and currently distributes 1,200 papers throughout the town.

== Education ==
School District 20 Kootenay-Columbia operates public schools in Rossland.

The Conseil scolaire francophone de la Colombie-Britannique operates one Francophone school: école des Sept-sommets primary school.

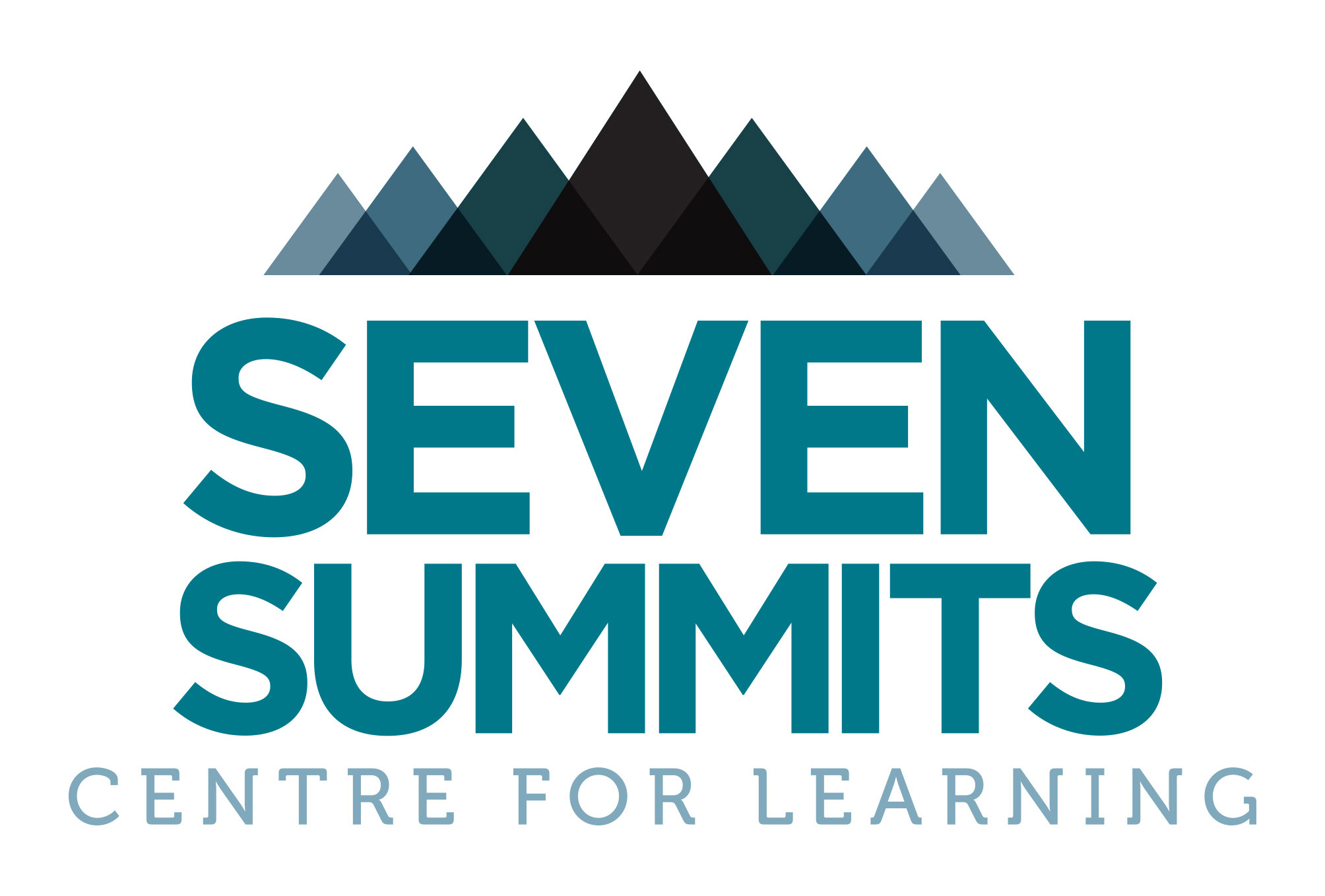
https://sevensummitslearning.com/

Seven Summits Centre for Learning opened in Fall 2013, a high school option for education grades 8–12 in Rossland which is not-for-profit. Seven Summits Centre for Learning blends online and traditional teaching styles to make an individualized high school alternative. The teaching structure is learner focused. This is done by teaching in small groups and allowing for extra alone study time in allocated spaces, or at home. Students are also required to complete volunteer hours and are given the option to partake in additional courses beyond their core structure if they wish to. This includes visiting experts who deliver workshops and talks at the centre. Beyond this, students are also expected to pursue fitness, and personal growth within the surrounding area, and are encouraged to go on all field trips offered.

Seven Summits Centre for Learning blends this with supervised access to a full range of courses delivered in virtual online classrooms provided by Navigate Nides. Seven Summits Centre for Learning's motto is: "Creating Adventures in Learning."

== Climate ==
Rossland features a humid continental climate (Köppen climate classification: Dfb) experiencing all four seasons. Summer days are usually warm with cool nights, while winters are cold.

Climate data for Rossland
Month	Jan	Feb	Mar	Apr	May	Jun	Jul	Aug	Sep	Oct	Nov	Dec	Year
Record high °C (°F)	7.5 (45.5)	13.3 (55.9)	16.0 (60.8)	27.2 (81.0)	30.5 (86.9)	31.0 (87.8)	35.0 (95.0)	35.0 (95.0)	32.8 (91.0)	25.0 (77.0)	15.0 (59.0)	9.0 (48.2)	35 (95)
Mean daily maximum °C (°F)	−3.0 (26.6)	0.0 (32.0)	4.9 (40.8)	10.3 (50.5)	15.4 (59.7)	19.6 (67.3)	23.4 (74.1)	23.4 (74.1)	17.3 (63.1)	10.6 (51.1)	1.0 (33.8)	−2.8 (27.0)	10.0 (50.0)
Daily mean °C (°F)	−5.8 (21.6)	−3.4 (25.9)	0.7 (33.3)	5.2 (41.4)	9.8 (49.6)	13.8 (56.8)	17.0 (62.6)	17.0 (62.6)	11.5 (52.7)	5.7 (42.3)	−1.6 (29.1)	−5.3 (22.5)	5.4 (41.7)
Mean daily minimum °C (°F)	−8.6 (16.5)	−6.7 (19.9)	−3.5 (25.7)	0.0 (32.0)	4.1 (39.4)	8.0 (46.4)	10.5 (50.9)	10.6 (51.1)	5.6 (42.1)	0.9 (33.6)	−4.2 (24.4)	−7.7 (18.1)	0.8 (33.4)
Record low °C (°F)	−25.5 (−13.9)	−25.0 (−13.0)	−17.8 (0.0)	−9.4 (15.1)	−4.5 (23.9)	0.0 (32.0)	2.0 (35.6)	2.2 (36.0)	−3.9 (25.0)	−18.0 (−0.4)	−25.0 (−13.0)	−33.3 (−27.9)	−33.3 (−27.9)
Average precipitation mm (inches)	98.5 (3.88)	95.0 (3.74)	77.0 (3.03)	60.2 (2.37)	74.9 (2.95)	68.0 (2.68)	46.6 (1.83)	48.7 (1.92)	50.7 (2.00)	55.0 (2.17)	119.7 (4.71)	122.9 (4.84)	917.2 (36.11)
Average rainfall mm (inches)	10.6 (0.42)	16.5 (0.65)	35.6 (1.40)	39.5 (1.56)	73.4 (2.89)	68.0 (2.68)	46.6 (1.83)	48.7 (1.92)	50.1 (1.97)	44.4 (1.75)	42.3 (1.67)	25.0 (0.98)	500.7 (19.72)
Average snowfall cm (inches)	88.5 (34.8)	78.6 (30.9)	41.5 (16.3)	20.7 (8.1)	1.5 (0.6)	0.0 (0.0)	0.0 (0.0)	0.0 (0.0)	0.6 (0.2)	10.6 (4.2)	77.4 (30.5)	97.9 (38.5)	417.3 (164.1)
Average precipitation days (≥ 0.2 mm)	14.8	13.8	14.6	11.6	13.8	13.1	9.1	9.0	8.5	10.4	15.7	16.5	150.9
Average rainy days (≥ 0.2 mm)	2.5	3.5	8.6	9.2	13.7	13.1	9.1	9.0	8.5	9.6	7.2	3.7	97.7
Average snowy days (≥ 0.2 cm)	13.0	11.6	9.2	4.6	0.63	0.0	0.0	0.0	0.16	1.8	11.1	14.7	66.79
Source: Environment Canada

== Freedom of the City ==
The following people have received the Freedom of the City of Rossland.

=== Individuals ===
- John A. McLeod: 1955.
- Nancy Greene Raine OC OBC OD: 1967.
- Harry Levefre: 1984.

== See also ==
- List of francophone communities in British Columbia
