= Regional District of Kootenay Boundary =

Regional district in British Columbia, Canada

Kootenay Boundary
- Regional district
- Regional District of Kootenay Boundary
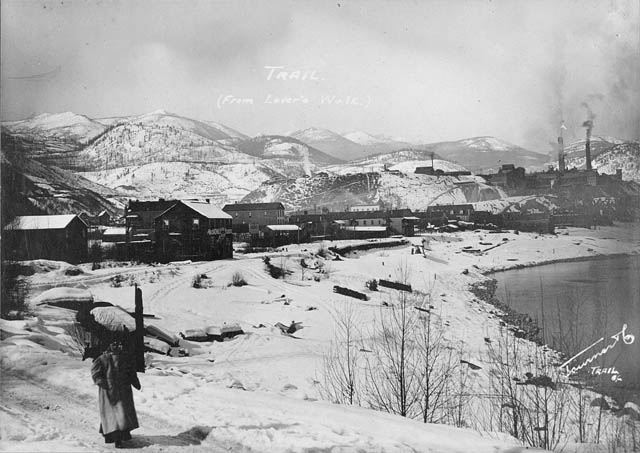
- City of Trail, 1908

- Logo

- Location in British Columbia
- Country: Canada
- Province: British Columbia
- Administrative office location: Trail

Government
  - Type: Regional district
  - Body: Board of directors
  - Chair: Diane Langman (Warfield)
  - Vice chair: Grace McGregor (C)
  - Electoral areas: A; B – Lower Columbia–Old Glory; C – Christina Lake; D – Rural Grand Forks; E – West Boundary

Area
  - Land: 8,084.52 km^{2} (3,121.45 sq mi)

Population (2021)
  - Total: 33,152
  - Density: 7.78/km^{2} (20.2/sq mi)
- Website: rdkb.com

The Regional District of Kootenay Boundary (RDKB) is one of 28 regional districts in the province of British Columbia, Canada. As of the 2016 Canadian census, the population was 31,447. The area is 8,095.62 km^{2} (3,125.74 sq mi). The RDKB was incorporated in 1966 and consists of eight incorporated municipalities and five unincorporated electoral areas. The regional district's offices are in the City of Trail, with secondary offices in the City of Grand Forks. Other major population centres include the cities of Rossland and Greenwood, and the villages of Fruitvale, Warfield, and Montrose. The region also encompasses electoral areas A (east of Fruitvale extending just past Champion Lakes and south to Waneta and the Pend d'Oreille River), B/Lower Columbia-Old Glory, C/Christina Lake, D/Rural Grand Forks and E/West Boundary including Rock Creek, Bridesville, Beaverdell and Big White Ski Resort.

Local government services provided by the RDKB to residents in the region include recreation and culture, planning, building inspection, environmental programs, economic development and public safety services for fire and other emergencies.

== Demographics ==
As a census division in the 2021 Census of Population conducted by Statistics Canada, the Regional District of Kootenay Boundary had a population of 33,152 living in 15,190 of its 18,998 total private dwellings, a change of 5.4% from its 2016 population of 31,447. With a land area of 8,080.76 km^{2} (3,120.00 sq mi), it had a population density of 4.1/km^{2} (10.6/sq mi) in 2021.

Panethnic groups in the Kootenay Boundary Regional District (1996−2021)
Panethnic group	2021		2016		2011		2006		2001		1996	
Panethnic group	Pop.	%	Pop.	%	Pop.	%	Pop.	%	Pop.	%	Pop.	%
European (Note: Statistic includes all persons that did not make up part of a visible minority or an indigenous identity.)	28,960	89.38%	27,615	90.04%	28,190	92.7%	28,040	92.54%	29,480	93.83%	31,170	95.79%
Indigenous	2,100	6.48%	1,995	6.5%	1,525	5.01%	1,380	4.55%	1,105	3.52%	525	1.61%
South Asian	410	1.27%	110	0.36%	115	0.38%	195	0.64%	235	0.75%	220	0.68%
East Asian (Note: Statistic includes total responses of "Chinese", "Korean", and "Japanese" under visible minority section on census.)	350	1.08%	370	1.21%	280	0.92%	420	1.39%	345	1.1%	290	0.89%
Southeast Asian (Note: Statistic includes total responses of "Filipino" and "Southeast Asian" under visible minority section on census.)	265	0.82%	275	0.9%	95	0.31%	80	0.26%	150	0.48%	70	0.22%
Latin American	110	0.34%	55	0.18%	40	0.13%	15	0.05%	55	0.18%	90	0.28%
African	95	0.29%	170	0.55%	110	0.36%	80	0.26%	10	0.03%	100	0.31%
Middle Eastern (Note: Statistic includes total responses of "West Asian" and "Arab" under visible minority section on census.)	20	0.06%	10	0.03%	15	0.05%	30	0.1%	25	0.08%	10	0.03%
Other (Note: Statistic includes total responses of "Visible minority, n.i.e." and "Multiple visible minorities" under visible minority section on census.)	95	0.29%	75	0.24%	25	0.08%	45	0.15%	10	0.03%	70	0.22%
Total responses	32,400	97.73%	30,670	97.53%	30,410	97.66%	30,300	98.56%	31,420	98.67%	32,540	98.89%
Total population	33,152	100%	31,447	100%	31,138	100%	30,742	100%	31,843	100%	32,906	100%

- Note: Totals greater than 100% due to multiple origin responses.

== Municipalities ==
Municipality	Government Type	Population
Trail	city	7,681
Grand Forks	city	3,985
Rossland	city	3,556
Greenwood	city	708
Fruitvale	village	2,016
Warfield	village	1,700
Montrose	village	1,030
Midway	village	674

== See also ==
- Kootenays
- Boundary Country
