= Trail, British Columbia =

Trail Trail Creek
- City
- City of Trail
- Trail in April 2026

- Coat of arms
- Motto: Explore Your Trail
- Location of Trail in British Columbia
- Coordinates: 49°05′40″N 117°42′33″W
- Country: Canada
- Province: British Columbia
- Region: Kootenays
- Regional district: Kootenay Boundary

Government
  - Type: Elected city council
  - Mayor: Nick Cashol
  - Governing body: Trail City Council
  - MP: Rob Morrison (CPC)
  - MLA: Steve Morissette (BC NDP)

Area (2021)
  - Total: 34.90 km^{2} (13.47 sq mi)
  - Census agglomeration: 279.13 km^{2} (107.77 sq mi)
- Elevation at Trail Airport: 435 m (1,427 ft)

Population (2021)
  - Total: 7,920
  - Density: 226.9/km^{2} (588/sq mi)
  - Census agglomeration: 279.13
  - Census agglomeration density: 51.1/km^{2} (132/sq mi)
- Time zone: UTC−07:00 (PST)
  - Summer (DST): UTC−07:00 (PDT)
- Forward sortation area: V1R
- Area codes: 250, 778, 236, and 672
- Highways: 3B; 22
- Waterways: Columbia River
- Website: trail.ca/en/index.aspx

Trail is a city in the western Kootenays region of the Interior of British Columbia, Canada. It was named after the Dewdney Trail, which passed through the area. The town was first called Trail Creek or Trail Creek Landing, and the name was shortened to Trail in 1897.

== Geography ==
Trail has a land area of 34.90 km^{2} (13.47 sq mi) and is located on both banks of the Columbia River, approximately 10 km (6.2 mi) north of the United States border. This section of the Columbia River valley is located between the Monashee Mountains to the west and the Selkirk Mountains to the east. The Columbia flows directly north-south from Castlegar, turns east near downtown Trail, and then meets the Canada–United States border at the Boundary–Waneta Border Crossing and the Pend d'Oreille River.

Summer climate in Trail is generally hot and dry with moderately cool nights. Temperatures often exceed 35 °C (95 °F) during summer afternoons, average 29 °C (84 °F). Thunderstorms are common during the late-spring and summer season, often moving into the valley from the south. The fall months bring dense river fog, especially overnight and in the morning, as a cold air inversion lingers above the relatively warm river surface. Winters are mild to cold with periods of moderate snowfall. Nearby villages such as Warfield, Fruitvale and especially Rossland receive greater amounts of snow due to higher elevation.

The Monashee Mountains are the first major mountain range east of the Coast Mountains to intercept moisture laden westerly flow from the Pacific Ocean. As a result, areas west of Trail, including the Christina Range, Rossland Range, the city of Rossland, and the Bonanza Pass (Blueberry-Paulson) section of the Crowsnest Highway (Highway 3) receive greater amounts of winter precipitation, mostly in the form of heavy snow. Vegetation in the Trail area, although still fairly lush, is noticeably drier than other areas of the West Kootenay, with a more westerly aspect.

== Demographics ==
In the 2021 Canadian census conducted by Statistics Canada, Trail had a population of 7,920 living in 3,736 of its 3,973 total private dwellings, a change of 2.7% from its 2016 population of 7,709. With a land area of 34.9 km^{2} (13.5 sq mi), it had a population density of 226.9/km^{2} (587.8/sq mi) in 2021.

=== Ethnicity ===
The city is noted for its large Italian community. Persons of Italian ancestry numbered 1,856 and formed 16.2 per cent of the total population according to the 1951 census, decreasing in number but increasing in proportion to 1,790 persons and 23.2 per cent as per the 1991 census, decreasing to 1,515 persons or 20.2 per cent in 1996, falling further by 2011 to 1,290 persons or 17.4 per cent of the population, prior to a slight increase to 1,320 persons or 17.8 per cent according to the 2016 census.

Panethnic groups in the City of Trail (1991−2021)
Panethnic group	2021		2016		2011		2006		2001		1996		1991	
Panethnic group	Pop.	%	Pop.	%	Pop.	%	Pop.	%	Pop.	%	Pop.	%	Pop.	%
European (Note: Statistic includes all persons that did not make up part of a visible minority or an indigenous identity.)	6,425	84.54%	6,475	87.26%	6,775	91.49%	6,330	90.82%	6,685	91.26%	7,160	95.85%	7,110	92.34%
Indigenous	675	8.88%	645	8.69%	390	5.27%	450	6.46%	290	3.96%	130	1.74%	235	3.05%
South Asian	255	3.36%	45	0.61%	0	0%	15	0.22%	100	1.37%	65	0.87%	60	0.78%
Southeast Asian (Note: Statistic includes total responses of "Filipino" and "Southeast Asian" under visible minority section on census.)	95	1.25%	65	0.88%	15	0.2%	65	0.93%	70	0.96%	45	0.6%	135	1.75%
East Asian (Note: Statistic includes total responses of "Chinese", "Korean", and "Japanese" under visible minority section on census.)	60	0.79%	95	1.28%	110	1.49%	45	0.65%	135	1.84%	40	0.54%	95	1.23%
African	20	0.26%	40	0.54%	90	1.22%	30	0.43%	0	0%	0	0%	35	0.45%
Latin American	15	0.2%	30	0.4%	0	0%	10	0.14%	30	0.41%	10	0.13%	10	0.13%
Middle Eastern (Note: Statistic includes total responses of "West Asian" and "Arab" under visible minority section on census.)	0	0%	0	0%	15	0.2%	25	0.36%	20	0.27%	0	0%	20	0.26%
Other/multiracial (Note: Statistic includes total responses of "Visible minority, n.i.e." and "Multiple visible minorities" under visible minority section on census.)	55	0.72%	20	0.27%	0	0%	10	0.14%	0	0%	10	0.13%	—N/a	—N/a
Total responses	7,600	95.96%	7,420	96.25%	7,405	96.41%	6,970	96.31%	7,325	96.7%	7,470	97.06%	7,700	97.23%
Total population	7,920	100%	7,709	100%	7,681	100%	7,237	100%	7,575	100%	7,696	100%	7,919	100%
Note: Totals greater than 100% due to multiple origin responses.

=== Religion ===
According to the 2021 census, religious groups in Trail included:

- Irreligion (3,865 persons or 50.9%)
- Christianity (3,455 persons or 45.5%)
- Sikhism (95 persons or 1.3%)
- Hinduism (75 persons or 1.0%)
- Buddhism (15 persons or 0.2%)
- Other (80 persons or 1.1%)

== Education and employment ==
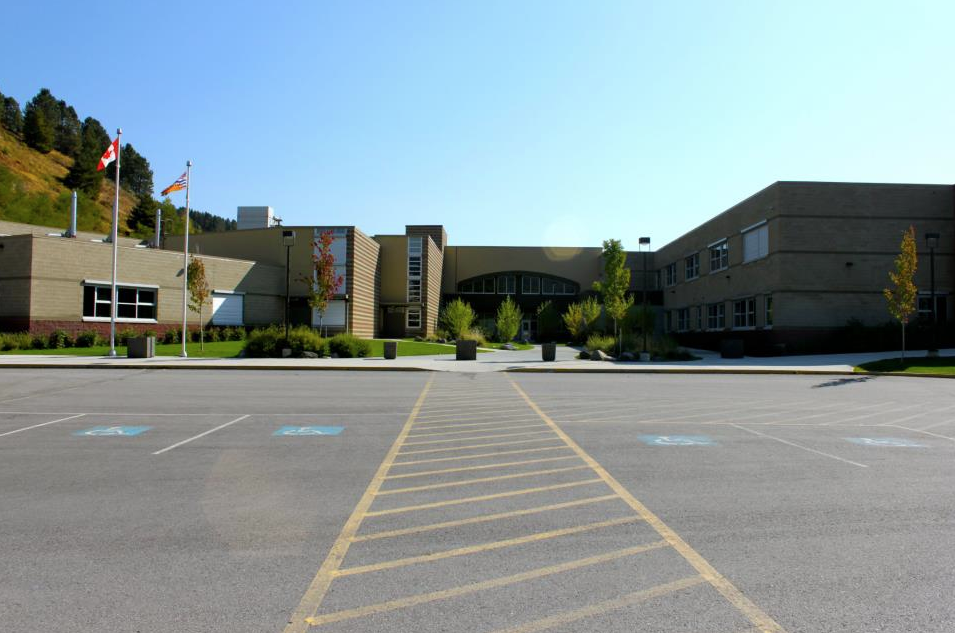
The entrance of J. Lloyd Crowe Secondary School

Trail is the location of the head office of the Regional District of Kootenay Boundary, which is one of the city's employers.

Trail is part of School District 20 Kootenay-Columbia and schools in the town include:

- Glenmerry Elementary School (public elementary school K-7)
- J. Lloyd Crowe Secondary School (public secondary school 8–12)
- James L Webster Elementary School (public elementary school K-7.)
- St. Michael's Catholic School (independent elementary school K-7)
- Kootenay-Columbia Learning Centre (public school 6–12)

=== School district ===
The school district serving the Greater Trail area has implemented a plan on improving the district’s operations and schools. These plans include research, established practices, and other methods of improvement.

In 2007, the J. Lloyd Crowe Secondary School Replacement program started the construction of a new facility in Trail to replace the existing school that was built in the late 1950s. The new facility opened in September 2009.

=== Education ===
Trail’s education statistics differ sharply from that of the province in the percentage of the population aged 45–64 with a trades certificate or diploma: Trail—26 per cent, compared to BC—14 per cent. This is directly attributable to Teck Resources and the diversified mining and metals company's presence in the area. The percentage of this age group with a university level education is also very different: Trail—12% per cent compared to BC—22 per cent. The general picture is a working population heavily geared to the trades and historically very reliant on Teck Resources for employment.

== Economic situation ==
Employing approximately 1,800 people, Teck Resources (formerly Cominco) is the region’s largest employer. The average age of an employee at Teck Resources' Trail operation is 47. It is anticipated that within 15 years Teck Resources' Trail operation will have a completely new and different labour force. A younger and technical labour force will most likely replace those that are retiring. The picture for the area is one of an aging population which brings about ongoing employment opportunities in the area.

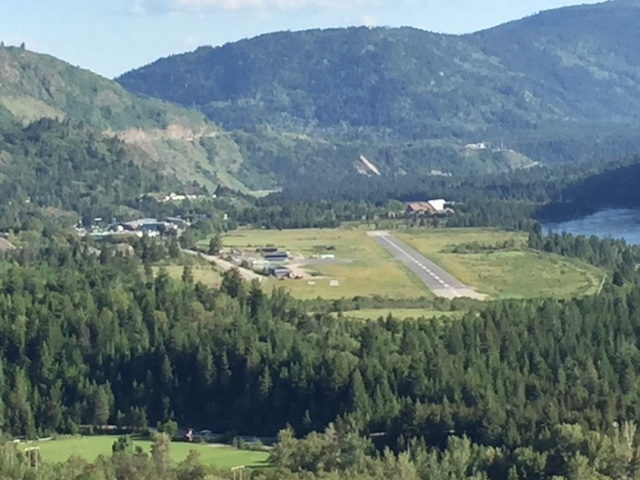
Trail Regional Airport

The City of Trail is also home to the largest hospital in the Kootenays region.

== Teck Cominco lead-zinc smelter ==
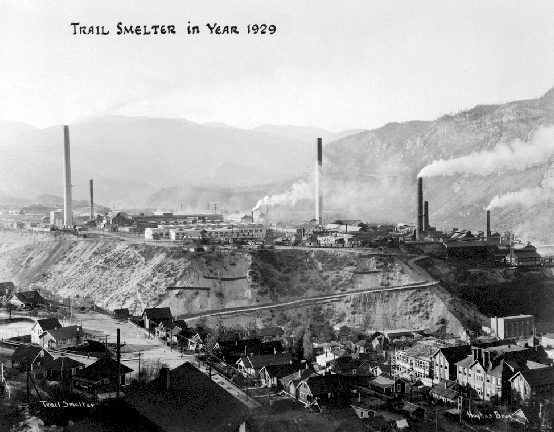
Trail Smelter in 1929

Trail is home to the Teck Cominco smelter, one of the largest lead smelters and zinc smelters in the world, and is the largest employer in Trail, providing 1,400 jobs in the town of 7800. The smelter has been in operation for over a hundred years and has provided many well-paying jobs that do not require more than a high school education. Intergenerational families worked at the smelter and Teck Cominco became Trail's "economic and cultural centre."

The Teck Cominco Interpretive Centre in downtown Trail provides a history of Cominco's Trail smelting operations with displays, a mini-science centre, hands-on exhibits, and videos, as well as a 2.5 hour industrial tour of the Teck Cominco smelter. Presentations include exhibits of sophisticated environmental monitoring systems installed in the Trail area by Teck.

In February 1896, Fritz Augustus Heinze opened his British Columbia Smelting and Refining Company smelter at Trail to process ore brought from Rossland on his Columbia and Western Railway. The concentrate from the smelter was transported to Butte, Montana, for refining. The plant capacity was soon increased from about 150 to 400 tons per day. However, with the supply of Rossland ore largely going south to Northport, the plant was unprofitable. The output was 50 per cent pure copper at best, and the yellow clouds of sulfur dioxide became health hazards for the region.

When the Canadian Pacific Railway (CP) expressed interest in buying the Columbia and Western Railway (C&W), Heinze insisted the package include the Trail smelter. In February 1898, CP bought the C&W for $600,000, and the smelter for $200,000. Heinze retained several other holdings. CP created the Canadian Smelting Works to run the plant. CP's new Crowsnest Pass branch supplied cheap coal, and the new Bonnington Falls dam provided electricity. That August, new blast furnaces increased efficiency and tall chimneys lifted the toxic smoke farther above Trail.

Since lead was the most common ore in the region, the company built two lead furnaces, which were operational by the end of 1901. The next year, the federal government offered a subsidy of five dollars for each ton of lead smelted in Canada. However, the concentrate still required refining at the American Smelting and Refining Company's plant in Tacoma, Washington. To address this problem, by the end of 1902, Trail opened the first commercial electrolytic refining process in the world, producing pure lead, pure copper, fine silver and gold. In 1906, the Consolidated Mining and Smelting Company of Canada (CM&S), a consortium comprising the smelter and certain Red Mountain mines at Rossland, was formed. CP had a 54 per cent holding. After the Northport smelter closed in 1921, Trail remained the sole operator in the region.

By 1925, the 1.0 km^{2} (250 acres) plant employed 2,100 men and comprised a lead plant, an electrolytic zinc plant, a copper smelter, a copper refinery, a silver and gold refinery, plants for making bluestone (Copper(II) sulfate), hydrofluosilicic acid and sulfuric acid, a foundry, a machine shop and round-house, and a copper rod mill. That year, CM&S processed 380,000 tons of ores and concentrates at Trail to recover 21,352 ounces of gold, nearly 4.5 million ounces of silver, 9,500 tons of copper, 117,500 tons of lead and almost 50,000 tons of zinc.

=== Trail smelter arbitration (1938–1942) ===
By the end of World War I, the smoke pollution had devastated the surrounding district. During the following decades, this triggered the Trail Smelter dispute, which resulted in decades of legal action. This case, known commonly as the "Trail smelter arbitration", is a landmark in environmental law, as it helped to establish the "polluter pays" principle for transnational pollution issues.

In 1966, the company name changed to Cominco. Over the following decades, the smelter spent millions on pollution control. In 1975, the soils in some parts of Trail were found to be contaminated with lead and certain other heavy metals (arsenic, cadmium, zinc) to levels above regulatory limits. The monitored lead levels in the blood of local school children fell from high that year to insignificant 30 years later.

In 2007, a free testing program was instituted, with removal of above-limit top soil in residential yards (with a priority focus on families with young children). Teck provides funding for this ongoing operation. Because of improvements in smelting processes and emissions controls over the years, the existing contamination is attributed to smelting activities that pre-date the 1997 adoption of newer technologies.

=== Pakootas v. Teck Cominco Metals ===
The Trail lead and zinc smelter is located 10 miles (16 km) north of the United States-Canadian border. Over the decades it has discharged approximately 10 million to 20 million tons of smelting byproduct containing lead, arsenic and mercury into the Columbia River and Franklin D. Roosevelt Lake in Washington. In 2004, a citizen lawsuit was filed under the 1980 Comprehensive Environmental Response, Compensation, and Liability Act (CERCLA) against Teck Cominco—, now Teck Resources The Supreme Court of the United States (SCOTUS) rejected Teck Metals' Petition for certiorari on June 10, 2019 in Teck Metals Ltd. v. The Confederated Tribes of the Colville Reservation. In 2018, the Supreme Court rejected Teck's appeal and found in favour of the litigants.

== Manhattan Project ==
As its contribution to the Manhattan Project's P-9 Project, Cominco built and operated a 1000 to 1200 pound per month (design capacity) electrolytic heavy water plant at Trail, which operated from 1943 to 1956. Lieutenant colonel Kenneth Nichols noted environmental damage from emissions to the "beautiful valley and mountain slopes" in the first half of 1943.

== Attractions ==
=== Trail Memorial Centre & Sports Hall of Memories ===
The Trail Memorial Centre currently plays host to the Trail & District Public Library, the Trail Smoke Eaters hockey team, the Trail Museum, and the Sports Hall of Memories, in addition to many local sports facilities. This historic landmark, located at 1051 Victoria Street, was home to two world championship Smoke Eaters teams.

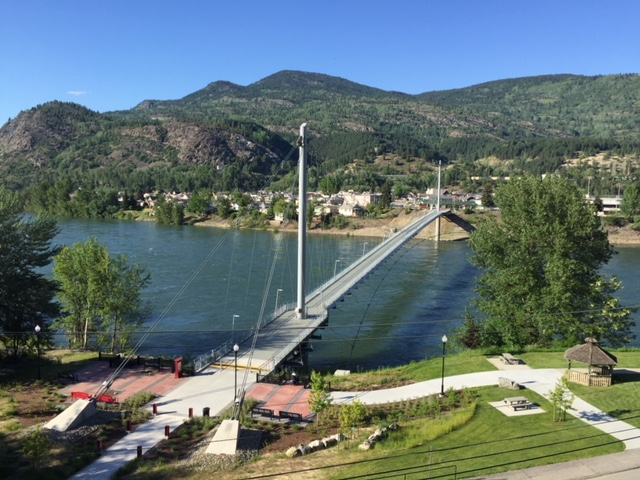
Pedestrian suspension bridge Trail, BC

The Trail Memorial Centre is a hub of civic activity year-round, and has been a focal point of the community since its inception.

=== Cominco Arena ===
The Cominco Arena is a 2,537-seat multi-purpose arena, home to the Trail Smoke Eaters, a junior A ice hockey team who play in the British Columbia Hockey League.

=== River activities and Music in the Park at Gyro Park ===
Located at 1090 Charles Lakes Drive in East Trail on the route to Sunningdale, Gyro Park is the home to Music in the Park during the summer.

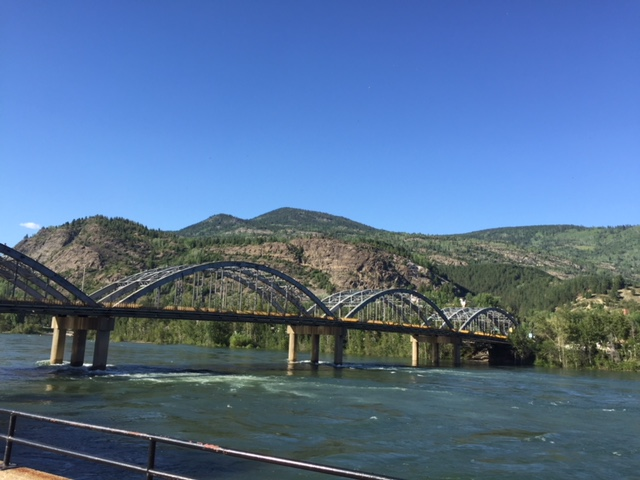
Victoria Street Bridge

"The Onions" and other popular river currents that wind between the rocks on the east banks of the Columbia River, are a popular summer magnet for river activity.

=== The historic Gulch ===
In the early 1900s a large influx of Italian immigrants lent a distinctive character to "The Gulch" which is located at the entrance to Trail accessed by the Schofield Highway which drops down the long grade from the city of Rossland and the village of Warfield and sub-division of Annabel onto Rossland Avenue.

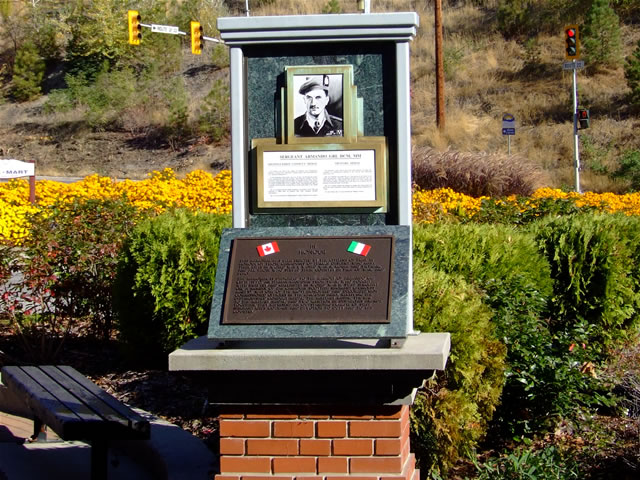
The Historic Gulch in Trail BC

This neighbourhood which runs the length of Rossland Avenue is known as "the Gulch." Originally called the "Dublin Gulch" in the very early days, it eventually became known as "The Gulch" as it filled up with Italians who chose not to live on the original Trail townsite. The Gulch starts as throat of Trail Creek narrows between the high, sandy slope of Smelter Hill on its left bank and the West Trail bank where early pioneer houses were built by immigrants as they purchased properties along the west bank steep terrain.

In the early pioneer days industrious Chinese launderers and cooks spent time gardening in the defile of the Gulch. Few of these immigrants ever acquired rights to own land in the Gulch and their gardens were gradually displaced by Italians and other European working families who terraced their properties into level plots. Despite the steep terrain, these immigrant families planted vegetable gardens reminiscent of the old country sustained by water from Trail Creek and a hot summer sun.

The Gulch is home to shops and the Terra Nova hotel, located at the entrance to Trail's central business district at the foot of Rossland Avenue.

== Home of Champions ==
The Greater Trail Area is known as the Home of Champions, in recognition of those who reside in the area, or are from the area, and have excelled in their chosen field of endeavour.

In 1995, Kootenay Savings Credit Union was seeking a project that would represent their commitment and appreciation to the Greater Trail community. The Credit Union decided to sponsor the construction of a monument which was constructed in the summer of 1996 outside their offices in Trail's downtown that would honour the "Champions" of the Greater Trail area in Sports, Industry and Lifestyle.

A society was formed to establish criteria for selection of the persons to be honoured on the monument. The monument was constructed in the summer of 1996 and forty-three champions were selected to be honoured at the inaugural dedication ceremony which took place on September 28, 1996. To date, eighty-nine individuals and organizations have been honoured with a place on the Home of Champions monument.

The Home of Champions monument project is an ongoing one, managed by the City of Trail. Additional persons will be honoured regularly for their special contribution to the social, cultural, economic and educational fabric of the community.

== Notable people ==
- John Rogers Anderson, chief of the Defence Staff
- Jason Bay, former Major League Baseball (MLB) player
- Lauren Bay-Regula, Canadian National Softball Team and National Pro Fastpitch pitcher
- Ed Cristofoli, former National Hockey League (NHL) player
- Craig Cunningham, former NHL player
- Frenchy D'Amour, 1948 Macdonald Brier champion curler
- Adam Deadmarsh, former NHL player, won Stanley Cup in 1996 with the Colorado Avalanche
- Dallas Drake, former NHL player, won a Stanley Cup in 2008 with the Detroit Red Wings
- Landon Ferraro, former NHL player, most recently with Kölner Haie of the Deutsche Eishockey Liga (DEL)
- Ray Ferraro, former NHL player and commentator on ESPN / ABC
- Derek Haas, retired World Hockey Association (WHA) player
- Jake Lucchini, former NHL player, currently with the Milwaukee Admirals of the American Hockey League (AHL)
- Bruno Freschi, architect for Expo 86
- Ken Georgetti, former president of the Canadian Labour Congress
- Robert Hampton Gray, one of the last Canadians to die in WWII and the last Canadian recipient of the Victoria Cross
- Tom Harrison, former MLB pitcher for the Kansas City A's, now known as the Oakland Athletics
- Shawn Hook, singer
- Shawn Horcoff former NHL player, most notably a former captain of the Edmonton Oilers
- Barret Jackman, former NHL player
- Hal Jones, hockey player who won gold at the 1961 Ice Hockey World Championships
- Mike Kobluk of The Chad Mitchell Trio
- Richard Kromm, former NHL player
- Kerrin Lee-Gartner, Canadian Olympic Women's Ski Team, Downhill Olympic Gold Medal 1992
- Gary Lunn, former Canadian MP and cabinet minister
- Cesare Maniago, former NHL player
- Seth Martin, former NHL player
- Mike Matteucci, former NHL player
- Steve McCarthy, former NHL player
- Tom McVie, former professional hockey player and NHL coach and scout for Boston Bruins
- Ben McPeek, composer, arranger, conductor, and pianist
- Bill McEwan, former president and CEO of Sobeys
- Faron Moller, computer scientist, former president of the British Colloquium for Theoretical Computer Science
- Martin Popoff, heavy metal music journalist
- Garth Rizzuto, former NHL player
- David Sylvester, president of University of St. Michael's College, University of Toronto, Canada.
- Steve Tambellini, former NHL player and general manager of the Edmonton Oilers
- Louis Secco & Gordie Robertson Olympic Champion Hockey Players; members of the Edmonton Mercurys that won the Gold Medal for Canada at the 1952 Winter Olympics.

== See also ==
- Trail Airport
- Trail Times
