= List of members of the Canadian House of Commons with military service (H) =

Name	Elected party	Constituency	Elected date	Military service
Albert Hagar	Liberal	Prescott	September 20, 1867	Militia
John Graham Haggart	Conservative	Lanark South	October 12, 1872	Militia (1861-1862)
David George Hahn	Liberal	Broadview	April 8, 1963	Canadian Army (1943-1945)
Maurice Hallé	Liberal	Brome—Missisquoi	March 26, 1940	Canadian Army
Ernest Halpenny	Progressive Conservative	London	June 10, 1957	Canadian Army (1942-1945)
Francis Alvin George Hamilton	Progressive Conservative	Qu'Appelle	June 10, 1957	Royal Canadian Air Force (1941-1945)
Frank Fletcher Hamilton	Progressive Conservative	Swift Current—Maple Creek	October 30, 1972	Royal Canadian Air Force (1940-1951)
Henry Sidney Hamilton	Liberal	Algoma West	October 14, 1935	Canadian Army (1914-1919)
John Borden Hamilton	Progressive Conservative	York West	November 8, 1954	Canadian Army
Richmond Francis Hanna	Liberal	Edmonton—Strathcona	August 10, 1953	Royal Canadian Air Force (1940-1945)
Hannes Marino Hannesson	Conservative	Selkirk	October 29, 1925	Canadian Army (1917-1918)
Randolph Harding	New Democrat	Kootenay West	June 25, 1968	Canadian Army (1945-)
Jack Hare	Progressive Conservative	St. Boniface	October 16, 1978	Canadian Army
"Bert" Thomas Hargrave	Progressive Conservative	Medicine Hat	October 30, 1972	Canadian Army
Douglas Harkness	Progressive	Calgary East	June 11, 1945	Canadian Army (1940-1949)
Harry Cruickshank Harley	Liberal	Halton	June 18, 1962	Royal Canadian Air Force (1944-1945), Canadian Army (1951-1956)
Walter Edward Harris	Liberal	Grey—Bruce	March 26, 1940	Canadian Army
Jeremy Harrison	Conservative	Churchill River	June 28, 2004	Canadian Forces Land Force Command
Jim Hart	Reform	Okanagan—Similkameen—Merritt	October 25, 1993	Canadian Forces Maritime Command (1973-1978), Canadian Forces (1988-1993)
Laurie Hawn	Conservative	Edmonton Centre	January 23, 2006	Royal Canadian Air Force (1964-1994)
Douglas King Hazen	National Government	St. John—Albert	March 26, 1940	Canadian Army
John Douglas Hazen	Conservative	City and County of St. John	March 5, 1891	Militia (1898-)
Dan Heap	New Democrat	Spadina	August 17, 1981	Canadian Army (1941-1946)
Edmund Heath	Conservative	Pontiac	September 20, 1867	Militia (1862-1869)
George Harris Hees	Progressive Conservative	Broadview	May 15, 1950	Canadian Army
Paul Theodore Hellyer	Liberal	Davenport	June 27, 1949	Canadian Army, Royal Canadian Air Force
William James Henderson	Liberal	Kingston City	June 27, 1949	Canadian Army (1942-1945)
Bernard Rickart Hepburn	Conservative	Prince Edward	September 21, 1911	Canadian Forestry Corps
Mitchell Frederick Hepburn	Liberal	Elgin West	September 14, 1926	Canadian Army, Royal Air Force
Harold Thomas Herbert	Liberal	Vaudreuil	October 30, 1972	Royal Canadian Air Force (1941-1946)
Herbert Wilfred Herridge	Independent Co-operative Commonwealth Federation	Kootenay West	June 11, 1945	Canadian Army
John Herron	Liberal-Conservative	Alberta (Provisional District)	November 3, 1904	Military
Nathaniel Higinbotham	Liberal	Wellington North	October 12, 1872	Militia (1866-1871)
Ramon John Hnatyshyn	Progressive Conservative	Saskatoon—Biggar	July 8, 1974	Royal Canadian Air Force (1951-1958)
Clayton Wesley Hodgson	Progressive Conservative	Victoria	June 11, 1945	Canadian Army
Douglas Aird Hogarth	Liberal	New Westminster	June 25, 1968	Canadian Army
Allan Henry Hollingworth	Liberal	York Centre	August 10, 1953	Royal Canadian Air Force (1942-1945)
John Holmes	Liberal-Conservative	Carleton	September 20, 1867	Militia (1866-1875)
Ambrose Holowach	Social Credit	Edmonton East	August 10, 1953	Canadian Army
Luther Hamilton Halton	Liberal	Châteauguay	September 20, 1867	Militia
Edmund John Glyn Hooper	Liberal-Conservative	Lennox	September 17, 1878	Militia (1837-1881)
Henry Alfred Hosking	Liberal	Wellington South	June 27, 1949	Canadian Army (1939-1945)
Charles Frederick Houghton	Liberal	Yale District	December 19, 1871	British Army (1856-1863), Militia (1873-1896)
Bruce Howard	Liberal	Okanagan Boundary	June 25, 1968	Royal Canadian Air Force (1945-1946)
William Dean Howe	New Democrat	Hamilton South	April 8, 1963	Royal Canadian Air Force (1942-1945)
Charles Hubbard	Liberal	Miramichi	October 25, 1993	Canadian Army (1959-1968), Canadian Forces (1968-1974)
Stanley Hudecki	Liberal	Hamilton West	September 8, 1980	Canadian Army (1942-1946)
Sam Hughes	Liberal-Conservative	Victoria North	February 11, 1892	Militia (1897-1900)
Levi William Humphrey	Progressive	Kootenay West	December 6, 1921	Canadian Army (1915-1919)
John William Gordon Hunter	Liberal	Parkdale	June 27, 1949	Canadian Army
Arthur Ronald Huntington	Progressive Conservative	Capilano	July 8, 1974	Royal Canadian Navy (1942-1945)
Richard Hutchison	Liberal	Northumberland	December 24, 1868	Militia
