= Ed Conroy (politician) =

Canadian politician (1946–2020)

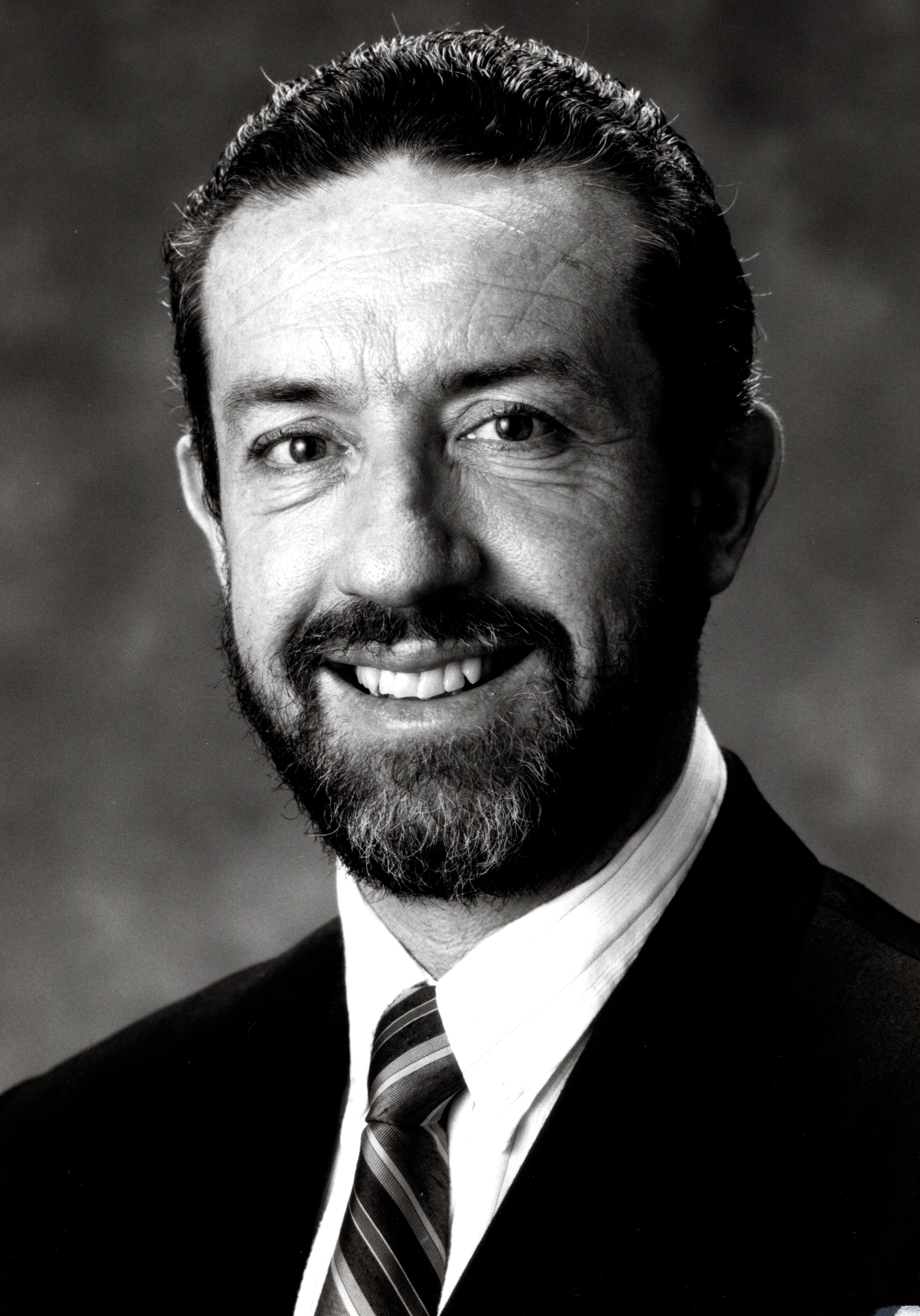

Minister of Agriculture, Food and Fisheries of British Columbia Minister Responsible for Rural Development
- In office November 1, 2000 – June 5, 2001
- Premier: Ujjal Dosanjh
- Preceded by: Corky Evans
- Succeeded by: John van Dongen (as Agriculture, Food & Fisheries)

Member of the British Columbia Legislative Assembly for Rossland-Trail
- In office October 17, 1991 – May 16, 2001
- Preceded by: Christopher D'Arcy
- Succeeded by: Riding Abolished

Personal details
- Born: Roy Edward Conroy; October 21, 1946 Rossland, British Columbia
- Died: June 26, 2020 (aged 73) Vancouver, British Columbia
- Party: New Democrat
- Spouse: Katrine Conroy
- Occupation: rancher

Roy Edward Conroy (October 21, 1946 – June 26, 2020) was a Canadian politician who served as Member of the Legislative Assembly (MLA) for Rossland-Trail in the Canadian province of British Columbia from 1991 to 2001. He was a member of the British Columbia New Democratic Party (BC NDP).

Conroy was born in Rossland, British Columbia and raised in Castlegar, where he attended Stanley Humphries Secondary School and Selkirk College. He studied political science and philosophy at the University of Victoria, then moved back to the Kootenays, briefly working at a pulp mill before getting hired by a saw mill to work on a towboat. He also raised purebred cattle. He was elected trustee for School District 9 in 1986, at one point serving as the board's vice-chair.

He was first elected to the Legislative Assembly of British Columbia in the 1991 provincial election, then won re-election in 1996. Under the ruling NDP, he served as government caucus chair from June 1996 to October 1997, then from March to November 2000. He also acted as parliamentary secretary to the Minister of Agriculture, Food and Fisheries and Minister of Transportation and Highways. Under Premier Ujjal Dosanjh, Conroy served as Minister of Agriculture, Food and Fisheries and Minister Responsible for Rural Development between November 2000 and June 2001.

He contested the newly constituted riding of West Kootenay-Boundary in the 2001 provincial election; with the NDP deeply unpopular within the province, he lost to Liberal candidate Sandy Santori.

He had two children with former partner Gwen Jones, then married Katrine Conroy (née Thor-Larsen) in 1981, with whom he had two more children. Katrine Conroy is the current MLA for the redistributed district of Kootenay West; she has served in the provincial cabinets of Premiers John Horgan and David Eby. He died at the age of 73 on June 26, 2020, from complications from surgery after sustaining a broken hip.

British Columbia provincial government of Ujjal Dosanjh
Cabinet posts (2)
Predecessor	Office	Successor
Corky Evans	Minister of Agriculture, Food and Fisheries; November 1, 2000–June 5, 2001	John van Dongen
Corky Evans	Minister Responsible for Rural Development; November 1, 2000–June 5, 2001	Ministry Abolished
