= British Columbia Southern Interior =

Former federal electoral district in British Columbia, Canada

Coordinates: 49.42°N 118.72°W

British Columbia electoral district
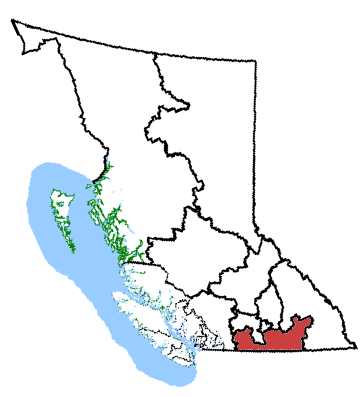
- British Columbia Southern Interior in relation to other British Columbia federal electoral districts

Defunct federal electoral district
- Legislature: House of Commons
- District created: 1996
- District abolished: 2013
- First contested: 1997
- Last contested: 2011
- District webpage: profile, map

Demographics
- Population (2011): 97,952
- Electors (2011): 74,996
- Area (km²): 26,248.34
- Census division(s): Okanagan-Similkameen, Kootenay Boundary, Central Kootenay
- Census subdivision(s): Nelson, Castlegar, Trail, Osoyoos, Oliver, Grand Forks, Okanagan-Similkameen C, Central Kootenay E, Central Kootenay F, Central Kootenay H,

British Columbia Southern Interior (formerly known as Southern Interior, Kootenay—Boundary—Okanagan and West Kootenay—Okanagan) was a federal electoral district in the province of British Columbia, Canada, that had been represented in the House of Commons of Canada from 1997 to 2015.

== Description ==
Regions included in the riding are the Similkameen, the southern half of the South Okanagan region, the Boundary Country, all of the West Kootenay region, the Slocan Valley, Lower (but not Upper) Arrow Lake, and including the east shore of Kootenay Lake from opposite Kaslo northwards.

Municipalities within the riding are Princeton, Keremeos, Oliver, Osoyoos, Greenwood, Grand Forks, Trail, Rossland, Warfield, Montrose, Fruitvale, Castlegar, Nelson, Salmo, Slocan, New Denver, Silverton, and Kaslo.

== History ==
This riding was created in 1996 as "West Kootenay—Okanagan" from parts of Kootenay West—Revelstoke and Okanagan—Similkameen—Merritt ridings.

It consisted of:

- Kootenay Boundary Regional District;
- subdivisions A and B of Central Kootenay Regional District; and
- the eastern part of Subdivision B of Okanagan-Similkameen Regional District.

It was renamed "Kootenay—Boundary—Okanagan" in 1998.

In the 2003 redistribution, the riding was replaced by the new riding of Southern Interior, with a small part being redistributed into Kootenay—Columbia and a small part added from Okanagan—Coquihalla.

In 2004, its name was changed to "British Columbia Southern Interior".

=== Members of Parliament ===
Parliament	Years	Member	Party
West Kootenay—Okanagan; Riding created from Kootenay West—Revelstoke and Okanagan—Similkameen—Merritt
36th	1997–2000	Jim Gouk	Reform
36th	2000–2000	Jim Gouk	Alliance
Kootenay—Boundary—Okanagan
37th	2000–2003	Jim Gouk	Alliance
37th	2003–2004	Jim Gouk	Conservative
Southern Interior
38th	2004–2006	Jim Gouk	Conservative
British Columbia Southern Interior
39th	2006–2008	Alex Atamanenko	New Democratic
40th	2008–2011	Alex Atamanenko	New Democratic
41st	2011–2015	Alex Atamanenko	New Democratic
Riding dissolved into South Okanagan—West Kootenay, Central Okanagan—Similkameen—Nicola and Kootenay—Columbia

== Election results ==
=== British Columbia Southern Interior ===
2011 Canadian federal election
Party	Candidate	Votes	%	±%	Expenditures
New Democratic	Alex Atamanenko	25,206	50.92	+3.40	$69,014.49
Conservative	Stephen Hill	19,273	38.93	+3.08	$73,525.72
Green	Bryan Hunt	3,153	6.37	–3.21	$3,390.88
Liberal	Shan Lavell	1,872	3.78	–3.11	$9,418.75
Total valid votes/expense limit		49,504	99.66	–	$95,753.29
Total rejected ballots		170	0.34	+0.02	
Turnout		49,674	65.58	+1.69	
Eligible voters		75,751			
New Democratic hold		Swing		+3.24	
Source: Elections Canada

2008 Canadian federal election
Party	Candidate	Votes	%	±%	Expenditures
New Democratic	Alex Atamanenko	22,693	47.52	–1.44	$65,793.44
Conservative	Rob Zandee	17,122	35.85	+16.59	$75,954.43
Green	Andy Morel	4,573	9.58	–1.74	$8,548.64
Liberal	Brenda Jagpal	3,292	6.89	–13.31	$28,279.70
Marxist–Leninist	Brian Sproule	80	0.17	–0.10	none listed
Total valid votes/expense limit		47,760	99.68	–	$92,328.06
Total rejected ballots		155	0.32	–0.18	
Turnout		47,915	63.89	–1.38	
Eligible voters		74,996			
New Democratic hold		Swing		–	
Source: Elections Canada

2006 Canadian federal election
Party	Candidate	Votes	%	±%	Expenditures
New Democratic	Alex Atamanenko	22,742	48.96	+13.82	$69,077.42
Liberal	Bill Profili	9,383	20.20	+2.24	$38,364.11
Conservative	Derek Zeisman	8,948	19.26	–17.34	$52,575.58
Green	Scott Leyland	5,258	11.32	+3.40	$13,952.05
Marxist–Leninist	Brian Sproule	123	0.27	+0.18	none listed
Total valid votes/expense limit		46,454	99.49	–	$85,159.61
Total rejected ballots		236	0.51	+0.15	
Turnout		46,690	65.27	–1.55	
Eligible voters		71,531			
New Democratic gain from Conservative		Swing		+15.58	
Source: Elections Canada

=== Southern Interior ===
2004 Canadian federal election
Party	Candidate	Votes	%	±%	Expenditures
Conservative	Jim Gouk	16,940	36.60	–15.26	$55,553.82
New Democratic	Alex Atamanenko	16,260	35.13	+25.28	$21,686.97
Liberal	Doug Stanley	8,310	17.96	–9.39	$72,491.61
Green	Scott Leyland	3,663	7.92	+1.45	$16,398.91
Independent	Robert Schuster	591	1.28	–	$9,669.66
Marijuana	Karine Cyr	391	0.85	–1.29	none listed
Canadian Action	Farlie Paynter	87	0.19	–1.65	$454.38
Marxist–Leninist	Brian Sproule	39	0.08	–	none listed
Total valid votes/expense limit		46,281	99.65	–	$82,368.52
Total rejected ballots		163	0.35	–	
Turnout		46,444	66.82	–	
Eligible voters		69,507			
Conservative hold		Swing		–	
Source: Elections Canada

=== Kootenay—Boundary—Okanagan ===
2000 Canadian federal election: Kootenay—Boundary—Okanagan
Party	Candidate	Votes	%	±%	Expenditures
Alliance	Jim Gouk	19,386	46.70	–0.09	$42,724
Liberal	Bill Barlee	11,357	27.36	+9.88	$32,709
New Democratic	Don Scarlett	4,091	9.85	–12.04	$7,473
Green	Andrew (Andy) Shadrack	2,689	6.48	+0.42	$14,652
Progressive Conservative	Michele Elise Duncan	2,147	5.17	–0.39	$3,532
Marijuana	Dan Loehndorf	889	2.14	–	$978
Canadian Action	Bev Collins	762	1.84	+0.91	$3,220
Natural Law	Annie Holtby	191	0.46	–	$886
Total valid votes		41,512	99.43		
Total rejected ballots		238	0.57	–	
Turnout		41,750	64.86	–	
Eligible voters		64,366			
Alliance hold		Swing		–4.98	
Source: Elections Canada

=== West Kootenay—Okanagan ===
1997 Canadian federal election: West Kootenay—Okanagan
Party	Candidate	Votes	%	Expenditures
Reform	Jim Gouk	18,954	46.78	$45,047
New Democratic	Kirk Duff	8,869	21.89	$40,603
Liberal	John A. Greaves	7,078	17.47	$17,158
Green	Andy Shadrack	2,455	6.06	$6,527
Progressive Conservative	Blair Suffredine	2,255	5.57	$23,236
Canadian Action	Beverly (Bev) Collins	377	0.93	$2,816
Christian Heritage	Brian J. Zacharias	340	0.84	$1,372
Natural Law	Ruth Anne Taves	187	0.46	$498
Total valid votes		40,515	99.55	
Total rejected ballots		185	0.45	
Turnout		40,700	66.68	
Eligible voters		61,038		
This riding was created from parts of Kootenay West—Revelstoke and Okanagan—Similkameen—Merritt, both of which elected a Reform candidate in the previous election. Reform candidate Jim Gouk was the incumbent from Kootenay West—Revelstoke.
Source: Elections Canada

== See also ==
- List of Canadian electoral districts
- Historical federal electoral districts of Canada
- List of electoral districts in the Okanagan
