= Douglas Turnbull =

Douglas Turnbull may refer to:

- Doug Turnbull, (1904 – 1996) American lacrosse player
- Douglass Turnbull, Professor of Neurology at Newcastle University

== See also ==
- Douglas Trumbull, (1942 - 2022) American film director
- Alexander Douglas Turnbull (1903 - 1993) Canadian engineer
