= Boundary-Similkameen =

Provincial electoral district in British Columbia, Canada

British Columbia electoral district
- Interactive map of riding boundaries

Provincial electoral district
- Legislature: Legislative Assembly of British Columbia
MLA
Donegal Wilson
Conservative
- District created: 2008
- First contested: 2009
- Last contested: 2026

Demographics
- Population (2021): 48,109
- Area (km²): 15,619
- Pop. density (per km²): 3.1
- Census division(s): Kootenay Boundary, Okanagan-Similkameen
- Census subdivision(s): Grand Forks, Keremeos, Princeton, Okanagan Falls, Oliver, Osoyoos

Boundary-Similkameen is a provincial electoral district in British Columbia that has been represented in the Legislative Assembly from 1966 to 1991 and since 2009.

The riding was established during the 2008 British Columbia electoral redistribution and was first contested in the 2009 general election. It was created out of parts of Penticton-Okanagan Valley, West Kootenay-Boundary and Yale-Lillooet.

== Demographics ==
Population, 2021	48,109
Area (km^{2})	15,619
Pop. Density (people per km^{2})	3
Source: BC Electoral Boundaries Commission

== Geography ==
The electoral district mainly includes communities along BC-3 (Crowsnest Highway), including Keremeos, Oliver, Osoyoos, Grand Forks, and Big White. Its southern boundary is the Canada–United States border. To the west, its boundary follows that of the Regional District of Okanagan-Similkameen; to the east, the boundary runs along that of the Regional District of Kootenay Boundary Electoral Area C. Its northern boundary largely follows that of the Regional District of Kootenay Boundary and of the Regional District of Okanagan-Similkameen and the southern limit of the city of Princeton.

== History ==
The original riding of Boundary-Similkameen was a provincial electoral district in the Canadian province of British Columbia. It spanned the Boundary Country, around the towns of Grand Forks and Rock Creek west including Oliver and Osoyoos to the Similkameen Valley towns of Keremeos and Princeton. The riding first appeared in the 1966 election as the result of a merger of the former ridings of Grand Forks-Greenwood (1924–1963) and Similkameen. Until the re-creation of Boundary-Similkameen, the former area was part of West Kootenay-Boundary; areas in the Similkameen had been part of Yale-Lillooet (which has been reconstituted as Fraser-Nicola).

== Members of the Legislative Assembly ==
Due to the realignment of electoral boundaries, most incumbents did not represent the entirety of their listed district during the preceding legislative term. Bill Barisoff of the BC Liberals was elected during the 2001 and 2005 elections to the Penticton-Okanagan Valley riding, where the majority of the new riding's population resides. Katrine Conroy of the BC NDP was the MLA for West Kootenay-Boundary, while Harry Lali was the MLA for Yale-Lillooet. The areas of those ridings that were added to Boundary–Similkameen are less populated and were not the main population centres in their respective districts.

=== Single-member district ===
Assembly	Years	Member	Party
Boundary-Similkameen; Riding created from Grand Forks-Greenwood, Similkameen and South Okanagan
28th	1966–1969	Frank Richter Jr.	Social Credit
29th	1969–1972	Frank Richter Jr.	Social Credit
30th	1972–1975	Frank Richter Jr.	Social Credit
31st	1975–1979	Jim Hewitt	Social Credit
32nd	1979–1983	Jim Hewitt	Social Credit
33rd	1983–1986	Jim Hewitt	Social Credit
Riding dissolved into Okanagan-Boundary and Okanagan-Penticton
Riding re-created from Penticton-Okanagan Valley, West Kootenay-Boundary and Yale-Lillooet
39th	2009–2013	John Slater	Liberal
40th	2013–2017	Linda Larson	Liberal
41st	2017–2020	Linda Larson	Liberal
42nd	2020–2024	Roly Russell	New Democratic
43rd	2024–2026	Donegal Wilson	Conservative
43rd	2026–2026	Donegal Wilson	Independent
43rd	2026–2026 (Note: Rejoined the Conservatives after dissolution.)	Donegal Wilson	CentreBC
44th	2026–present	Donegal Wilson	Conservative

Dual-member district (1986–1991)
Parliament	Years	Member	Party	Member	Party
34th	1986–1988	Jim Hewitt	Social Credit	Ivan Messmer	Social Credit
34th	1988–1991	Bill Barlee	New Democratic	Ivan Messmer	Social Credit

== Electoral history ==
2026 British Columbia general election
Party	Candidate	Votes	%	±%	Expenditures
Conservative	Donegal Wilson	11,855	52.31		
New Democratic	Roly Russell	9,205	40.62		
OneBC	Keith Pomeroy	1,534	6.77	—	
Total valid votes		22,594	99.69		
Total rejected ballots		70	0.31		
Turnout		22,664			
Registered voters					
Conservative hold		Swing		+3.01	
Source: Elections BC

2024 British Columbia general election
Party	Candidate	Votes	%	±%	Expenditures
Conservative	Donegal Wilson	11,935	48.39	+37.21	$33,102.59
New Democratic	Roly Russell	10,497	42.56	−7.29	$60,076.63
Green	Kevin Eastwood	1,454	5.89	–	$574.99
Independent	Sean Taylor	779	3.16	–	$1,380.30
Total valid votes/expense limit		24,665	99.85	–	$71,700.08
Total rejected ballots		36	0.15	–	
Turnout		24,701	62.74	+5.90	
Registered voters		39,371			
Conservative gain from New Democratic		Swing		+22.25	
Source: Elections BC

2020 British Columbia general election
Party	Candidate	Votes	%	±%	Expenditures
New Democratic	Roly Russell	10,500	49.85	+17.12	$22,881.87
Liberal	Petra Veintimilla	7,735	36.72	−6.08	$47,872.88
Conservative	Darryl Seres	2,354	11.18	–	$2,932.14
Wexit	Arlyn Greig	474	2.25	–	$4.00
Total valid votes		21,063	99.02	–	
Total rejected ballots		208	0.99	+0.54	
Turnout		21,271	56.84	–7.96	
Registered voters		37,421			
New Democratic gain from Liberal		Swing		+11.60	
Source: Elections BC

2017 British Columbia general election
Party	Candidate	Votes	%	±%	Expenditures
Liberal	Linda Larson	9,513	42.80	−3.79	$68,560.09
New Democratic	Colleen Ross	7,275	32.73	−6.26	$60,024.28
Independent	Peter Entwistle	3,165	14.24	–	$3,653.00
Green	Vonnie Lavers	2,274	10.23	+1.45	$1,170.00
Total valid votes		22,227	100.00		
Total rejected ballots		98	0.44		
Turnout		22,325	64.80		
Registered voters		34,450			
Source: Elections BC

2013 British Columbia general election
Party	Candidate	Votes	%	±%	Expenditures
Liberal	Linda Larson	8,499	46.59	+9.14	$61,031
New Democratic	Sam Hancheroff	7,113	38.99	+6.08	$70,135
Green	John Kwasnica	1,602	8.78	−0.7	$1,334
No Affiliation	Mischa Popoff	655	3.59	–	$3,725
Independent	Doug Pederson	375	2.06	–	$0
Total valid votes		18,244	100.00		
Total rejected ballots		113	0.62		
Turnout		18,357	61.85		
Source: Elections BC

B.C. General Election 2009 Boundary-Similkameen
Party	Candidate	Votes	%	±	Expenditures
Liberal	John Slater	6,681	37.45%	-8.25	$99,832
NDP	Lakhvinder Jhaj	5,870	32.91%	-7.89	$52,629
Conservative	Joe Cardoso	3,596	20.16%		$20,592
Green	Bob Grieve	1,691	9.48%	-0.02	$2,025
Total valid votes		17,838	100%		
Total rejected ballots		122	0.68%		
Turnout		17,960	62.31%		

Boundary-Similkameen Byelection, June 8, 1988 resignation of Jim Hewitt
Party	Candidate	Votes	%	±	Expenditures
New Democratic	Bill Barlee	15,778	52.82%		unknown
Social Credit	Russ Fox	10,515	35.44%	–	unknown
Liberal	Judi Tyabji	3,144	10.53%	–	unknown
Green	Rus Domer	361	1.21%	–	unknown
Total valid votes		29,868	100.00%		
Total rejected ballots		218			
Turnout		%			
^{2} Seat increased to two members from one.

The 1988 byelection, which elected NDP member Bill Barlee, was the last appearance of the Boundary-Similkameen riding until its recreation in 2009. For the 1991 election, the area became represented by Okanagan-Boundary.

34th British Columbia election, 1986 ^{2>}
Party	Candidate	Votes	%	±	Expenditures
Social Credit	Jim Hewitt	18,204	29.99%	–	unknown
Social Credit	Ivan Messmer	16,150	26.61%	–	unknown
New Democratic	Eldon John Harrop	11,656	19.21%		unknown
New Democratic	Wesley G. Nickel	11,427	18.83%		unknown
Liberal	Anna Rita Lusier	1,729	2.85%	–	unknown
Green	John Mercer Hughes	893	1.47%	–	unknown
Green	David G. Cursons	634	1.04%	–	unknown
Total valid votes		60,693	100.00%		
Total rejected ballots		758			
Turnout		%			
^{2} Seat increased to two members from one.

33rd British Columbia election, 1983
Party	Candidate	Votes	%	±	Expenditures
Social Credit	Jim Hewitt	18,869	54.82%	–	unknown
New Democratic	Yvonne Joan Storey	14,468	42.03%		unknown
Liberal	Kenneth Leslie Carig Hasanen	1,086	3.15%	–	unknown
Total valid votes		34,423	100.00%		
Total rejected ballots		312			
Turnout		%			

32nd British Columbia election, 1979
Party	Candidate	Votes	%	±	Expenditures
Social Credit	Jim Hewitt	13,739	47.56%	–	unknown
New Democratic	Bryan Patrick McIver	11,485	39.76%		unknown
Progressive Conservative	John Edwin Swales	3,662	12.68%		unknown
Total valid votes		28,886	100.00%		
Total rejected ballots		324			
Turnout		%			

31st British Columbia election, 1975
Party	Candidate	Votes	%	±	Expenditures
Social Credit	Jim Hewitt	10,784	48.31%	–	unknown
New Democratic	Yvonne Joan Storey	9,183	41.13%		unknown
Progressive Conservative	Barry Donald Montgomery	1,778	7.96%		unknown
Liberal	James Elder	580	2.60%	–	unknown
Total valid votes		22,325	100.00%		
Total rejected ballots		161			
Turnout		%			

30th British Columbia election, 1972
Party	Candidate	Votes	%	±	Expenditures
Social Credit	Frank Richter, Jr.	8,092	44.11%	–	unknown
New Democratic	Bill Barlee	6,850	37.34%		unknown
Liberal	Ruth Schiller	1,855	10.11	–	unknown
Progressive Conservative	Donald James Ewart	1,550	8.45%		unknown
Total valid votes		18,347	100.00%		
Total rejected ballots		122			
Turnout		%			

29th British Columbia election, 1969
Party	Candidate	Votes	%	±	Expenditures
Social Credit	Frank Richter, Jr.	8,944	54.29%	–	unknown
New Democratic	Bill Barlee	4,957	30.09%		unknown
Liberal	Donald Grant MacDonald	2,575	15.63%	–	unknown
Total valid votes		16,476	100.00%		
Total rejected ballots		122			
Turnout		%			

28th British Columbia election, 1966
Party	Candidate	Votes	%	±	Expenditures
Social Credit	Frank Richter, Jr.	6,547	55.44%	–	unknown
New Democratic	Lois Haggen	3,669	31.07%		unknown
Liberal	John Victor Hyde Wilson	1,594	13.50%	–	unknown
Total valid votes		11,810	100.00%		
Total rejected ballots		87			
Turnout		%			

== See also ==
- List of British Columbia provincial electoral districts
- Canadian provincial electoral districts
