= Kootenay-Monashee =

Provincial electoral district in British Columbia, Canada

British Columbia electoral district
- Interactive map of riding boundaries

Provincial electoral district
- Legislature: Legislative Assembly of British Columbia
MLA
Steve Morissette
New Democratic
- District created: 2008
- First contested: 2009
- Last contested: 2026

Demographics
- Population (2021): 41,446
- Area (km²): 11,551
- Pop. density (per km²): 3.6
- Census division(s): Central Kootenay, Kootenay Boundary
- Census subdivision(s): Castlegar, Trail, Rossland, Nakusp

Kootenay-Monashee (formerly Kootenay West) is a provincial electoral district in British Columbia that has been represented in the Legislative Assembly of British Columbia since 2009.

It was established during the 2008 British Columbia electoral redistribution and was first contested in the 2009 general election. The riding adopted its current name and underwent minor boundary changes following the 2024 general election, which implemented the results of the 2021 redistribution.

The riding is considered a safe NDP seat; the party has won 12 of the last 13 elections since 1972.

== Demographics ==
Population, 2021	41,446
Area (km^{2})	11,551
Pop. Density (people per km^{2})	3
Source: BC Electoral Boundaries Commission

== Geography ==
As of the 2024 provincial election, Kootenay-Monashee comprises the western portion of the Regional District of Central Kootenay and the southeastern portion of the Regional District of Kootenay Boundary. It is located in southern British Columbia and is bordered by Washington, United States to the south. Communities in the electoral district consist of Castlegar, Trail, Rossland, Fruitvale, and Nakusp.

== Members of the Legislative Assembly ==
On account of the realignment of electoral boundaries, most incumbents did not represent the entirety of their listed district during the preceding legislative term. The current MLA is Steve Morissette of the British Columbia New Democratic Party, elected in the 2024 election. Prior to 2001, the majority of the electoral district was part of the Rossland-Trail riding.

Assembly	Years	Member	Party
Kootenay West; Riding created from West Kootenay-Boundary and Nelson-Creston
39th	2009–2013	Katrine Conroy	New Democratic
40th	2013–2017	Katrine Conroy	New Democratic
41st	2017–2020	Katrine Conroy	New Democratic
42nd	2020–2024	Katrine Conroy	New Democratic
Kootenay-Monashee
43rd	2024–2026	Steve Morissette	New Democratic
44th	2026–present	Steve Morissette	New Democratic

== Election results ==
=== Kootenay-Monashee ===
2026 British Columbia general election
The 2026 general election will be held on October 24.
Party	Candidate	Votes	%	±%	Expenditures
New Democratic	Steve Morissette				
Conservative	Warren Mirko				
OneBC	Stephen Hill				
Green	Connie Larochelle				
Total valid votes					
Total rejected ballots					
Turnout					
Registered voters					
Source: Elections BC

2024 British Columbia general election
Party	Candidate	Votes	%	±%	Expenditures
New Democratic	Steve Morissette	10,202	52.04	-10.9	$37,605.09
Conservative	Glen Byle	7,616	38.85	+30.4	$5,091.08
Green	Donovan Cavers	1,785	9.11	-8.3	$0.00
Total valid votes/expense limit		19,603	99.78	–	$71,700.08
Total rejected ballots		43	0.22	–	
Turnout		19,646	60.02	–	
Registered voters		32,732			
New Democratic notional hold		Swing		-20.6	
Source: Elections BC

2020 provincial election redistributed results
Party	%
New Democratic	62.9
Green	17.4
Liberal	11.1
Conservative	8.5

=== Kootenay West ===
2020 British Columbia general election: Kootenay West
Party	Candidate	Votes	%	±%	Expenditures
New Democratic	Katrine Conroy	10,822	61.15	+1.51	$28,778.63
Green	Andrew Duncan	3,040	17.18	+1.19	$681.94
Liberal	Corbin Kelley	1,975	11.16	−13.21	$1,167.21
Conservative	Glen Byle	1,447	8.18	–	$1,516.50
Independent	Ed Varney	224	1.27	–	$297.00
Independent	Fletcher Quince	189	1.07	–	$0.00
Total valid votes		17,697	100.00	–	
Total rejected ballots					
Turnout					
Registered voters					
Source: Elections BC

2017 British Columbia general election: Kootenay West
Party	Candidate	Votes	%	±%	Expenditures
New Democratic	Katrine Conroy	11,297	59.64	−3.37	$37,247
Liberal	Jim Postnikoff	4,617	24.37	+3.04	$16,277
Green	Sam Troy	3,029	15.99	–	
Total valid votes		18,943	100.00		
Total rejected ballots		93	0.49		
Turnout		19,036	60.78		
Source: Elections BC

2013 British Columbia general election: Kootenay West
Party	Candidate	Votes	%	±%	Expenditures
New Democratic	Katrine Conroy	11,349	63.01	−3.66	$75,493
Liberal	Jim Postnikoff	3,841	21.33	−1.05	$35,773
Independent	Joseph Peter Hughes	2,391	13.27	–	$7,070
Independent	Glen Curtis Byle	431	2.39	–	$920
Total valid votes		18,012	100.00		
Total rejected ballots		86	0.48		
Turnout		18,098	56.92		
Source: Elections BC

B.C. General Election 2009 Kootenay West
Party	Candidate	Votes	%	±	Expenditures
NDP	Katrine Conroy	12,126	66.65%		$56,860
Liberal	Brenda Binnie	4,072	22.38%		$53,116
Green	Andy Morel	1,791	9.84%	–	$7,170
Communist	Zachary Crispin	204	1.13%		$2,232
Total Valid Votes		18,193	100%		
Total Rejected Ballots		88	0.48%		
Turnout		18,281	59.10%		

== See also ==
- List of electoral districts in the Kootenays
- List of British Columbia provincial electoral districts
- Canadian provincial electoral districts
