= People's Co-operative Commonwealth Federation =

Electoral label used in British Columbia

The People's Co-operative Commonwealth Federation was a label used by candidates in elections in the Canadian province of British Columbia who were not endorsed by the Co-operative Commonwealth Federation, but who were supportive of its policies.

In the 1945 federal election, Herbert Wilfred Herridge, ran as a "People's CCF" candidate in the riding of Kootenay West. Herridge had previously run for the CCF twice and had been a sitting CCF member of the British Columbia Legislative Assembly since 1941. He was expelled from the CCF when he resigned as a member of the provincial legislature to contest the 1945 federal election despite a CCF provincial council decision that he should not quit his legislative seat.

Herridge won the riding with 6,123 votes, while the official CCF candidate won 1,611. Herridge was officially listed as an "Independent CCF" candidate and Member of Parliament. He was re-admitted to the CCF prior to the 1949 and was re-elected in that and subsequent elections as a CCF candidate, or later, as a New Democratic Party candidate when the CCF became the NDP in 1961.

People's CCF candidates also ran in two British Columbia provincial elections:

- In the October 25, 1945 provincial election, Peter Stewart Beatt won 726 votes (13.92% of the total) as the PCCF candidate in Nelson-Creston riding. The official CCF candidate won 1,249 votes (23.95%). William Cunningham won 2,060 votes (32.06%) as a PCCF candidate in Rossland-Trail riding, beating the official CCF candidate, who won 933 votes (14.52%).
- In the June 15, 1949 provincial election, Philip Franklin Tompkins won 470 votes (9.97%) as the PCCF candidate in Peace River riding. The official CCF candidate won 1,901 votes (40.34%).
