= Donald Leslie Brothers =

Canadian lawyer and politician (1923-2017)

Member of the British Columbia Legislative Assembly for Rossland-Trail
- In office December 15, 1958 – August 30, 1972
- Preceded by: Robert Sommers
- Succeeded by: Christopher D'Arcy

Personal details
- Born: November 8, 1923 Grand Forks, British Columbia
- Died: February 9, 2017 (aged 93) Grand Forks, British Columbia
- Party: Social Credit
- Occupation: Lawyer

Donald Leslie Brothers (November 8, 1923 – February 9, 2017) was a lawyer and political figure in British Columbia. He represented Rossland-Trail in the Legislative Assembly of British Columbia from 1958 to 1972 as a Social Credit member.

He was born in Grand Forks, British Columbia, the son of Montezuma Leslie Brothers and Lorna May Cumming, and was educated at the University of British Columbia. Brothers served as a pilot in the Royal Canadian Air Force during World War II. In 1947, he married Dorothy Marie Crowe. Brothers ran unsuccessfully in the federal riding of Kootenay West as a Social Credit candidate in 1957. He was first elected to the provincial assembly in a 1958 by-election held after Robert Sommers was convicted of bribery and conspiracy. Brothers served in the provincial cabinet as Minister of Mines and Petroleum Resources and as Minister of Education. He was defeated by Christopher D'Arcy when he ran for reelection in 1972. He died at the age of 93 in 2017.
