= Ivan Messmer =

Canadian politician

Member of the British Columbia Legislative Assembly for Boundary-Similkameen
- In office October 22, 1986 – October 17, 1991 Serving with Jim Hewitt (1986-1987); Bill Barlee (1988-1991)
- Preceded by: Jim Hewitt
- Succeeded by: Jim Beattie

Mayor of Penticton
- In office 1980–1986

Personal details
- Born: Ivan Charles Messmer; July 23, 1931 Barrhead, Alberta, Canada
- Died: March 8, 2015 (aged 83) Penticton, British Columbia, Canada
- Party: Social Credit
- Occupation: building contractor, mayor

Ivan Charles Messmer (July 23, 1931 – March 8, 2015) was a Canadian politician, who represented the riding of Boundary-Similkameen in the Legislative Assembly of British Columbia from 1986 to 1991 as a member of the Social Credit Party. He held several roles in the Executive Council of British Columbia during his term as an MLA, including Minister of Parks and Solicitor General of British Columbia.

He served alongside Jim Hewitt, and later Bill Barlee, in a multiple-member district. Following riding redistribution for the 1991 general election, Messmer ran in the new district of Okanagan-Penticton, but was defeated by Jim Beattie.

Prior to entering provincial politics, Messmer served six years as mayor of Penticton. He died on March 8, 2015.
