= Katrine Conroy =

Canadian politician (born 1957)

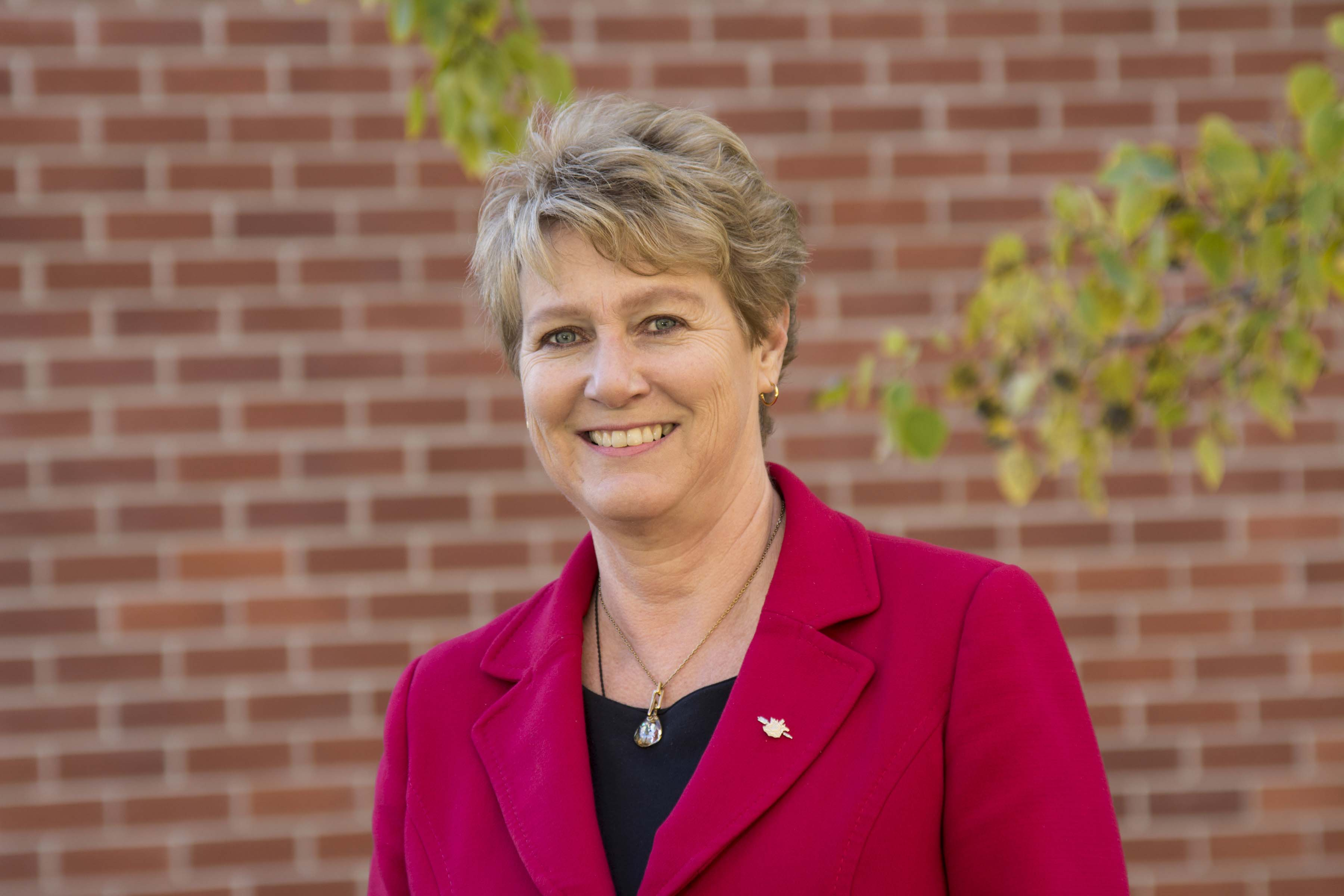

Minister of Finance
- In office December 7, 2022 – November 18, 2024
- Premier: David Eby
- Preceded by: Selina Robinson
- Succeeded by: Brenda Bailey

Minister of Forests
- In office November 26, 2020 – December 7, 2022
- Premier: John Horgan; David Eby
- Preceded by: Doug Donaldson
- Succeeded by: Bruce Ralston

Ministry of Children and Family Development
- In office July 18, 2017 – November 26, 2020
- Premier: John Horgan
- Preceded by: Stephanie Cadieux
- Succeeded by: Mitzi Dean

Member of the British Columbia Legislative Assembly for Kootenay West West Kootenay-Boundary (2005-2009)
- In office May 17, 2005 – September 21, 2024
- Preceded by: Sandy Santori
- Succeeded by: Steve Morissette

Personal details
- Born: Katrine Thor-Larsen; 1957 or 1958 (age 67–68) Powell River, British Columbia, Canada
- Party: New Democrat
- Spouse: Ed Conroy (m. 1981; died 2020)
- Children: 4
- Occupation: Politician, rancher

Katrine Conroy (née Thor-Larsen; born 1957) is a Canadian politician who was elected to the Legislative Assembly of British Columbia in the 2005 provincial election and served until 2024. She represented the electoral district of Kootenay West as a member of the British Columbia New Democratic Party (BC NDP). She served in the cabinet of British Columbia from 2017 until 2024, most recently as Minister of Finance.

== Background ==
Conroy was born to Ben and Ingeborg Thor-Larsen, who were Danish immigrants to Canada. The family settled in the West Kootenay in 1962, with Katrine graduating from Castlegar's Stanley Humphries Secondary School in 1975, before finding work as a power engineer at the local pulp mill. She completed the early childhood education program at Selkirk College, then worked at local daycares before eventually becoming executive director of the Kootenay Columbia Childcare Society. In 1997 she returned to Selkirk College as a part-time instructor.

She was married to Ed Conroy, a former Member of the Legislative Assembly (MLA) for the district of Rossland-Trail, from March 1981 until his death on June 26, 2020, at the age of 73. She has 4 children.

== Political career ==
Conroy ran as the NDP candidate for the riding of West Kootenay-Boundary in the 2005 provincial election, winning the seat by 7,138 votes. She was subsequently named caucus whip for the NDP in June 2005. In the 2009 election she ran in the riding of Kootenay West, winning by a margin of 8,054 votes; she was re-elected in that riding in the 2013, 2017 and 2020 elections. While the NDP was in opposition, Conroy served as critic in several portfolios, including Seniors, Interior Economic Development, and Labour.

Following NDP leader Carole James's dismissal of MLA Bob Simpson from party caucus, Conroy resigned from her position as opposition caucus whip on November 19, 2010.

With the NDP coming to power as a minority government following the 2017 election, Conroy was appointed Minister of Children and Family Development under Premier John Horgan. Following her re-election in 2020, she was appointed Minister of Forests in the Horgan ministry. On December 7, 2022 she was appointed Minister of Finance by Premier David Eby. On May 10, 2024, she announced she would not be seeking reelection to the Legislature.

== Electoral record ==
2020 British Columbia general election: Kootenay West
Party	Candidate	Votes	%	±%	Expenditures
New Democratic	Katrine Conroy	10,822	61.15	+1.51	$28,778.63
Green	Andrew Duncan	3,040	17.18	+1.19	$681.94
Liberal	Corbin Kelley	1,975	11.16	−13.21	$1,167.21
Conservative	Glen Byle	1,447	8.18	–	$1,516.50
Independent	Ed Varney	224	1.27	–	$297.00
Independent	Fletcher Quince	189	1.07	–	$0.00
Total valid votes		17,697	100.00	–	
Total rejected ballots					
Turnout					
Registered voters					
Source: Elections BC

2017 British Columbia general election: Kootenay West
Party	Candidate	Votes	%	±%	Expenditures
New Democratic	Katrine Conroy	11,297	59.64	−3.37	$37,247
Liberal	Jim Postnikoff	4,617	24.37	+3.04	$16,277
Green	Sam Troy	3,029	15.99	–	
Total valid votes		18,943	100.00		
Total rejected ballots		93	0.49		
Turnout		19,036	60.78		
Source: Elections BC

2013 British Columbia general election: Kootenay West
Party	Candidate	Votes	%	±%	Expenditures
New Democratic	Katrine Conroy	11,349	63.01	−3.66	$75,493
Liberal	Jim Postnikoff	3,841	21.33	−1.05	$35,773
Independent	Joseph Peter Hughes	2,391	13.27	–	$7,070
Independent	Glen Curtis Byle	431	2.39	–	$920
Total valid votes		18,012	100.00		
Total rejected ballots		86	0.48		
Turnout		18,098	56.92		
Source: Elections BC

British Columbia provincial government of David Eby
Cabinet post (1)
Predecessor	Office	Successor
Selina Robinson	Minister of Finance; December 7, 2022 –	Incumbent
British Columbia provincial government of John Horgan
Cabinet posts (2)
Predecessor	Office	Successor
Stephanie Cadieux	Minister of Children and Family Development; July 18, 2017 – November 26, 2020	Mitzi Dean
Doug Donaldson	Minister of Forests; November 26, 2020 – December 7, 2022	Bruce Ralston
