= Steve Morissette =

Canadian politician

Steve Morissette MLA
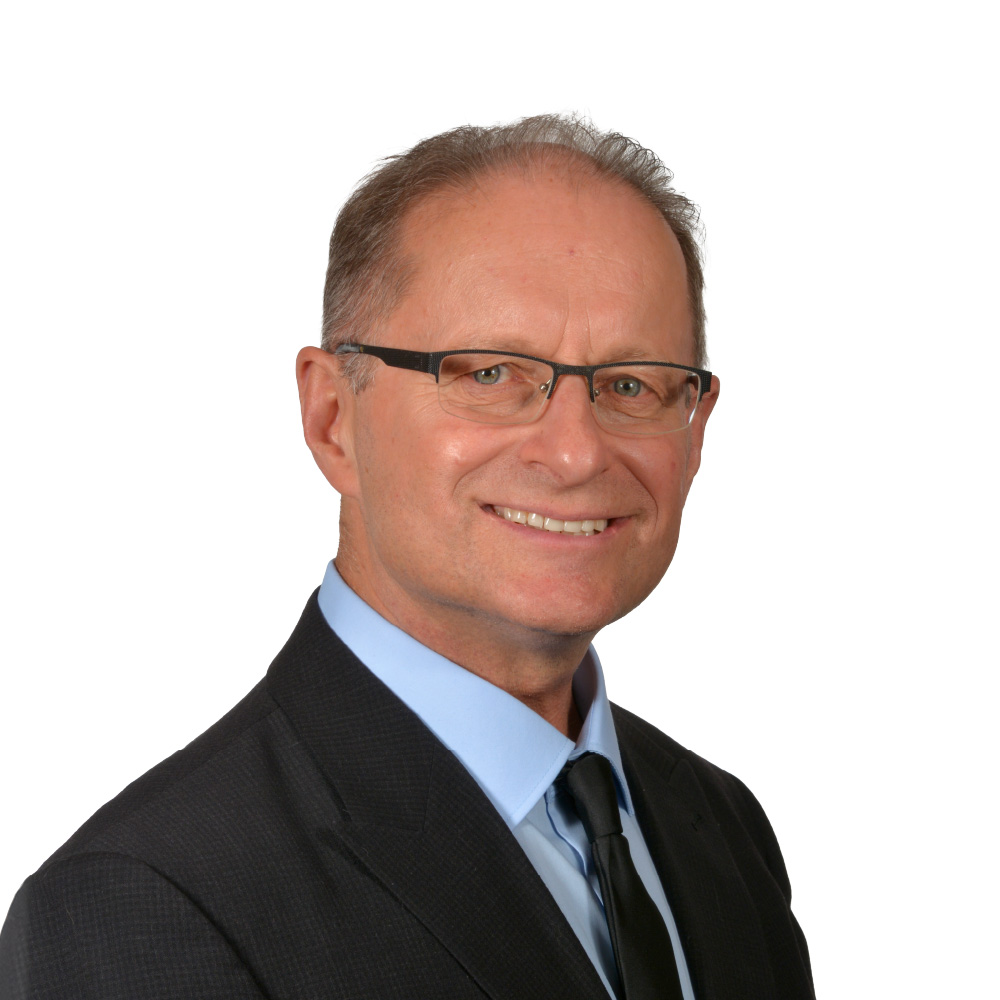
- Morissette in 2024

Parliamentary Secretary for Rural Development of British Columbia
- Incumbent
- Assumed office November 18, 2024
- Premier: David Eby
- Preceded by: Roly Russell

Member of the British Columbia Legislative Assembly for Kootenay-Monashee
- Incumbent
- Assumed office October 19, 2024
- Preceded by: Katrine Conroy

Mayor of Fruitvale
- In office November 5, 2018 – November 5, 2024
- Preceded by: Patricia Cecchini
- Succeeded by: Wes Startup

Personal details
- Party: New Democratic

Steve Morissette MLA is a Canadian politician who has served as a member of the Legislative Assembly of British Columbia (MLA) representing the electoral district of Kootenay-Monashee since 2024. He is a member of the New Democratic Party. Prior to provincial politics, he served as the mayor of Fruitvale from 2018 to 2024.

== Electoral history ==
2026 British Columbia general election: Kootenay-Monashee
Party	Candidate	Votes	%	±%	Expenditures
New Democratic	Steve Morissette	8,526	47.97	-4.07	
Conservative	Warren Mirko	6,632	37.31	-1.54	
Green	Connie Larochelle	1,822	10.25	+1.14	
OneBC	Stephen Hill	771	4.34	-	
Total valid votes		17,751	99.87		
Total rejected ballots		23	0.13		
Turnout					
Registered voters					
New Democratic hold		Swing		-2.81	
Source: Elections BC

2024 British Columbia general election: Kootenay-Monashee
Party	Candidate	Votes	%	±%	Expenditures
New Democratic	Steve Morissette	10,202	52.04	-10.9	$37,605.09
Conservative	Glen Byle	7,616	38.85	+30.4	$5,091.08
Green	Donovan Cavers	1,785	9.11	-8.3	$0.00
Total valid votes/expense limit		19,603	99.78	–	$71,700.08
Total rejected ballots		43	0.22	–	
Turnout		19,646	60.02	–	
Registered voters		32,732			
New Democratic notional hold		Swing		-20.6	
Source: Elections BC

== See also ==
- 43rd Parliament of British Columbia
