= Kootenay West—Revelstoke =

Former federal electoral district in British Columbia, Canada

British Columbia electoral district

Defunct federal electoral district
- Legislature: House of Commons
- District created: 1987
- District abolished: 1996
- First contested: 1988
- Last contested: 1993

Kootenay West—Revelstoke was a federal electoral district in British Columbia, Canada, that was represented in the House of Commons of Canada from 1988 to 1997. This riding was created in 1987 from Kootenay West riding. It was eliminated in 1996 when it was merged into the new riding of West Kootenay—Okanagan.

It consisted of Electoral Area B of the Columbia-Shuswap Regional District, the city of Revelstoke, the northwest part of the Central Kootenay Regional District, and the eastern part of the Kootenay Boundary Regional District.

== Members of Parliament ==
Parliament	Years	Member	Party
Riding created from Kootenay West
34th	1988–1993	Lyle Kristiansen	New Democratic
35th	1993–1997	Jim Gouk	Reform
Riding dissolved into West Kootenay—Okanagan

== Election results ==
1993 Canadian federal election
Party	Candidate	Votes	%	±%
Reform	Jim Gouk	11,348	32.46	–
Liberal	Garry R. Jenkins	10,620	30.38	+14.81
New Democratic	Heather Suggitt	5,483	15.68	–30.85
Progressive Conservative	Blair Suffredine	3,111	8.90	–27.09
National	Bev Collins	2,983	8.53	–
Green	Jack Ross	809	2.31	+0.40
Christian Heritage	Brian Zacharias	336	0.96	–
Natural Law	Michèle Roy	191	0.55	–
Canada Party	Greg Eyolfson	79	0.23	–
Total valid votes		34,960	99.50	
Total rejected ballots		176	0.50	+0.20
Turnout		35,136	70.07	–13.80
Eligible voters		50,146		
Reform gain from New Democratic		Swing		+8.82
Source: Elections Canada

1988 Canadian federal election
Party	Candidate	Votes	%	±%
New Democratic	Lyle Kristiansen	16,381	46.54	–
Progressive Conservative	Robert Brisco	12,667	35.98	–
Liberal	Garry R. Jenkins	5,479	15.56	–
Green	Michael Brown	674	1.91	–
Total valid votes		35,201	99.70	
Total rejected ballots		105	0.30	–
Turnout		35,306	83.87	–
Eligible voters		42,096		
New Democratic notional gain from Progressive Conservative		Swing		–
This riding was created from part of Kootenay West, where Progressive Conservative Robert Brisco was the incumbent.
Source: Elections Canada

== See also ==
- List of Canadian electoral districts
- Historical federal electoral districts of Canada
