= Linda Larson =

Canadian politician

Member of the British Columbia Legislative Assembly for Boundary-Similkameen
- In office May 14, 2013 – November 24, 2020
- Preceded by: John Slater
- Succeeded by: Roly Russell

Personal details
- Born: 1948 or 1949 (age 77–78)
- Party: BC Liberals
- Spouse: Larry Larson
- Children: 3
- Salary: $62,331

Linda Margaret Larson (born 1948 or 1949) is a Canadian politician, who was elected to the Legislative Assembly of British Columbia in the 2013 provincial election. She represented the electoral district of Boundary-Similkameen as a member of the British Columbia Liberal Party until 2020.

In government, she served as the Parliamentary Secretary to the Minister of Health for Seniors and as the Parliamentary Secretary for Rural Education. In opposition, she served as the Official Opposition critic for Childcare as well as the Deputy Whip of the Official Opposition.

Prior to her election to the Legislative Assembly, Larson was a municipal councillor and mayor in Oliver.

== Electoral record ==
2017 British Columbia general election: Boundary-Similkameen
Party	Candidate	Votes	%	±%	Expenditures
Liberal	Linda Larson	9,513	42.80	−3.79	$68,560.09
New Democratic	Colleen Ross	7,275	32.73	−6.26	$60,024.28
Independent	Peter Entwistle	3,165	14.24	–	$3,653.00
Green	Vonnie Lavers	2,274	10.23	+1.45	$1,170.00
Total valid votes		22,227	100.00		
Total rejected ballots		98	0.44		
Turnout		22,325	64.80		
Registered voters		34,450			
Source: Elections BC

2013 British Columbia general election: Boundary-Similkameen
Party	Candidate	Votes	%	±%	Expenditures
Liberal	Linda Larson	8,499	46.59	+9.14	$61,031
New Democratic	Sam Hancheroff	7,113	38.99	+6.08	$70,135
Green	John Kwasnica	1,602	8.78	−0.7	$1,334
No Affiliation	Mischa Popoff	655	3.59	–	$3,725
Independent	Doug Pederson	375	2.06	–	$0
Total valid votes		18,244	100.00		
Total rejected ballots		113	0.62		
Turnout		18,357	61.85		
Source: Elections BC
