= William Esling =

Canadian politician (1868–1946)

Member of the Legislative Assembly of British Columbia for Rossland
- In office 1920–1924

Member of Parliament for Kootenay West
- In office October 1925 – April 1945
- Preceded by: Levi William Humphrey
- Succeeded by: Herbert Wilfred Herridge

Personal details
- Born: William Kemble Esling; 19 February 1868 Philadelphia, Pennsylvania, United States
- Died: 3 December 1946 (aged 78) Rossland, British Columbia, Canada
- Party: Conservative; National Government
- Profession: agent, newspaper publisher

William Kemble Esling (19 February 1868 – 3 December 1946) was a Conservative and National Government party member of the House of Commons of Canada. He was born in Philadelphia, Pennsylvania, United States and became an agent and newspaper publisher by career.

He attended Girard College in Philadelphia, and then emigrated to Canada in 1896. For two decades, he maintained British Columbia newspaper enterprises in Rossland and Trail.

Esling was a Conservative member of the Legislative Assembly of British Columbia from 1920 until his retirement at the 1924 provincial election, for the Rossland electoral district.

He was first elected to Parliament at the Kootenay West riding in the 1925 general election then re-elected for successive terms in 1926, 1930 and 1935. He was also re-elected in 1940 under the National Government party banner. Esling did not seek re-election to Parliament in 1945 and left the House of Commons after completing his term in the 19th Canadian Parliament. He also held the distinction of being the only blind Member of Parliament during his tenure in the House.
