= Sandy Santori =

Canadian politician

Member of the British Columbia Legislative Assembly for West Kootenay-Boundary
- In office May 16, 2001 – May 17, 2005
- Preceded by: Ed Conroy
- Succeeded by: Katrine Conroy

Minister of Management Services of British Columbia
- In office June 5, 2001 – January 26, 2004
- Premier: Gordon Campbell

Minister of State for Resort Development of British Columbia
- In office January 26, 2004 – January 11, 2005
- Premier: Gordon Campbell
- Succeeded by: Patty Sahota

Personal details
- Born: 1954 or 1955 (age 71–72) Trail, British Columbia, Canada
- Party: BC Liberal
- Occupation: Insurance Sales Management

Sandy Santori (born 1954 or 1955) is a former Canadian politician. Santori served as a BC Liberal Member of the Legislative Assembly of British Columbia from 2001 to 2005. He had previously served as the mayor of Trail, British Columbia and in his youth was the goalie of the Trail Smoke Eaters Junior Hockey and then the Saint Michaels Buzzers of the OKHL. From there Santori went on to play for the Ivy League Cornell Red on a full hockey scholarship. He represented the riding of West Kootenay-Boundary. He was appointed Minister of Management Services in 2001 and Minister of State for Resource Development in 2004. In January 2005 resigned from the legislature, giving health reasons and a new job as general manager of Rossland-Trail Country Club.
