= Alex Atamanenko =

Canadian politician (born 1945)

Alex T. Atamanenko
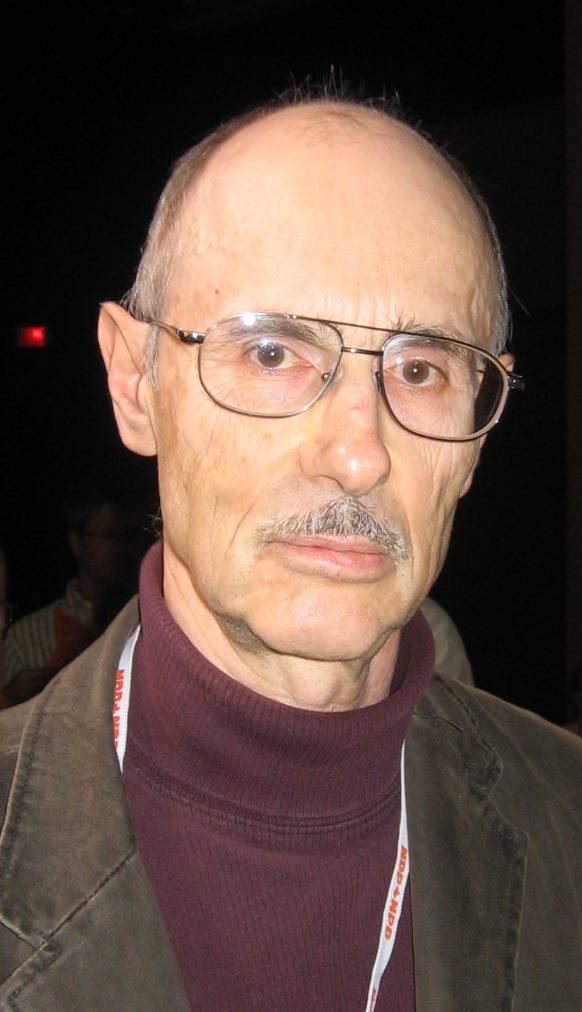

Member of Parliament for British Columbia Southern Interior
- In office January 23, 2006 – August 4, 2015
- Preceded by: Jim Gouk
- Succeeded by: Riding Abolished

Personal details
- Born: January 24, 1945 (age 81) New Westminster, British Columbia, Canada
- Party: New Democratic Party
- Spouse: Ann Atamanenko
- Education: University of British Columbia; University of Toronto
- Profession: Teacher

Alex T. Atamanenko (born January 24, 1945) is a Canadian politician who served as the member of Parliament (MP) for British Columbia Southern Interior from 2006 to 2015. A member of the New Democratic Party (NDP), Atamanenko was first elected in the 2006 federal election and retired in 2015. He worked as a teacher before entering politics.

== Biography ==
Atamanenko was born in New Westminster, and was educated at the University of British Columbia and the University of Toronto. Atamanenko has a bachelor's degree in physical education, a teaching diploma, and a Master of Arts degree in Russian. Atamanenko is a member of the British Columbia Retired Teachers Association. He taught Russian, French and English at a number of schools across Canada and the United States. He also has experience in recreation and physical education with a number of organizations, including the Boys' Clubs of Vancouver, the Canadian Forces Base in Portage la Prairie, Manitoba, and for the Coquitlam and New Westminster recreation departments, where he was part-time leader and co-ordinator, as well as for the government of the Yukon as a co-ordinator for the Canada Games (1976–1977) and a recreation consultant (1977–1979). He was also a freelance translator, and is a karate instructor with the Castlegar Karate Club. Other community activities include involvement with the Canadian Youth Hostelling Association in Whitehorse and serving on the Coaching Council of Canada during the 1970s.

== Politics ==
Atamanenko contested the riding of Southern Interior, as it was called then, in the federal election of 2004; he lost narrowly to the incumbent Conservative MP, Jim Gouk.

Atamanenko contested the riding again in the 2006 federal election, which became open when Gouk left federal politics. His candidacy received a significant boost after the Conservative candidate, Derek Zeisman, was disowned by the party after being caught trying to smuggle alcohol across the U.S.–Canada border. Atamanenko won by over 13,000 votes. He was re-elected in the 2008 and 2011 elections, in the latter case gaining 50.9% of valid ballots cast in his riding.

Atamanenko paid homage to NDP leader Jack Layton after his bout with cancer, saying "Jack was the epitome of a trustworthy, honourable politician who inspired many Canadians, regardless of their political allegiance. He cared deeply about our country, and he really gave his life to it. Jack appealed to the best in people. He gave so many young people, who are rightly critical of many aspects of our electoral system, something to believe in, something to hope for in what he was trying to achieve and the vision he shared with so many in our party."

In 2026, Atamanenko endorsed Avi Lewis in that year's federal NDP leadership race.

== Electoral record ==
2011 Canadian federal election: British Columbia Southern Interior
Party	Candidate	Votes	%	±%	Expenditures
New Democratic	Alex Atamanenko	25,176	50.9	+3.4	
Conservative	Stephen Hill	19,276	38.9	+3.1	
Green	Bryan Hunt	3,173	6.4	-3.2	
Liberal	Shannon (Shan) Lavell	1,872	3.8	-3.1	
Total valid votes/Expense limit		49,674	100.0		

2008 Canadian federal election: British Columbia Southern Interior
Party	Candidate	Votes	%	±%	Expenditures
New Democratic	Alex Atamanenko	22,693	47.5	-1.5	$66,606
Conservative	Rob Zandee	17,122	35.9	+16.6	$76,704
Green	Andy Morel	4,573	9.6	-1.7	$8,439
Liberal	Brenda Jagpal	3,292	6.9	-13.3	$28,430
Marxist–Leninist	Brian Sproule	80	0.2	-0.1	--
Total valid votes/Expense limit		47,915	100.0	$92,328	
Total rejected ballots		155	0.3	-0.2	
Turnout		47,915	63.89		

2006 Canadian federal election: British Columbia Southern Interior
Party	Candidate	Votes	%	±%	Expenditures
New Democratic	Alex Atamanenko	22,742	49.0	+13.9	$72,595
Liberal	Bill Profili	9,383	20.2	+2.2	$40,534
Conservative	Derek Zeisman	8,948	19.3	-17.3	$53,470
Green	Scott Leyland	5,258	11.3	+3.4	$14,334
Marxist–Leninist	Brian Sproule	123	0.3	+0.2	$0
Total valid votes		46454	100.0		
Total rejected ballots		236	0.5		
Turnout		46,690	66.4		
NDP gain from Conservative		Swing	+15.6		

2004 Canadian federal election: Southern Interior
Party	Candidate	Votes	%	±%	Expenditures
Conservative	Jim Gouk	16,940	36.6	*	$55,553
New Democratic	Alex Atamanenko	16,260	35.1	+25.3	$22,019
Liberal	Doug Stanley	8,310	18.0	-9.4	$74,051
Green	Scott Leyland	3,663	7.9	+1.4	$16,098
Independent	Robert Schuster	591	1.3	*	$9,264
Marijuana	Karine Cyr	391	0.8	*	
Canadian Action	Farlie Paynter	87	0.2	*	$454
Marxist–Leninist	Brian Sproule	39	0.1	*	
Total valid votes		46,281	100.0		
Total rejected ballots		163	0.4		
Turnout		46,444	60.0		
