= James Lockhart Webster =

Canadian politician

Member of the Legislative Assembly of British Columbia
- In office 1946 – August 8, 1948
- Preceded by: Herbert Wilfred Herridge
- Succeeded by: James O'Donnell Quinn
- Constituency: Rossland-Trail

Personal details
- Born: December 31, 1885 Walthamstow, England
- Died: August 8, 1948 (aged 62) Trail, British Columbia
- Party: Coalition
- Spouse: Agnes Thomson
- Occupation: Accountant

James Lockhart Webster (December 31, 1885 – August 8, 1948) was a Canadian politician. He served in the Legislative Assembly of British Columbia from 1946 to 1948 from the electoral district of Rossland-Trail, a member of the Coalition government. He died in office in 1948 from lung cancer.
