= John Slater (Canadian politician) =

Canadian politician

MLA for Boundary-Similkameen
- In office 2009–2013
- Preceded by: first member
- Succeeded by: Linda Larson

Personal details
- Born: January 25, 1952 Kelowna, British Columbia
- Died: May 10, 2015 (aged 63) British Columbia, Canada
- Party: BC Liberals

John Kelvin Slater (January 25, 1952 – May 10, 2015) was a Canadian politician, who was elected as a BC Liberal Member of the Legislative Assembly of British Columbia in the 2009 provincial election, representing the riding of Boundary-Similkameen.

On January 14, 2013, Slater quit the BC Liberals after losing the nomination as the party's candidate in the 2013 election. Although he did plan to run as an independent, he withdrew his candidacy shortly afterward.

Prior to his election to the legislature, he was mayor of Osoyoos. Slater died on May 10, 2015, at the age of 63.
