= Robert Sommers =

Canadian politician

MLA for Rossland-Trail
- In office 1952–1958
- Preceded by: Alexander Douglas Turnbull
- Succeeded by: Donald Leslie Brothers

Personal details
- Born: January 3, 1911 Leduc, Alberta, Canada
- Died: October 28, 2000 (aged 89) Nanaimo, British Columbia, Canada
- Party: Social Credit
- Occupation: Teacher, Politician, Piano tuner

Robert Edward Sommers (January 3, 1911 – October 28, 2000) was a Canadian elementary school principal and a politician. Sommers served as a Social Credit Member of the Legislative Assembly of British Columbia from 1952 to 1958, representing the riding of Rossland-Trail in the province of British Columbia. He served as Minister of Lands and Forests and as Minister of Mines until his resignation February 27, 1956. He was tried and in 1958 was convicted of bribery and conspiracy making him the first cabinet minister in the British Commonwealth to serve a term of imprisonment for accepting bribes in connection with his office.

== Early life ==
Born in Leduc, Alberta in 1911, Sommers was the son of J. L. Sommers and Elsie Armonies, both natives of Germany who came to Canada in 1889.

Before entering politics, Sommers was an elementary school principal in Castlegar, BC. He was a trumpet player, a local band leader, a part-time insurance broker, a Kiwanis club president and a volunteer firefighter.

He was married twice: first to Marion Henry in 1930 and then to Nona Samson in 1940.

== Political career ==
He was first elected as an MLA under the banner of the British Columbia Social Credit League as the member for Rossland-Trail in 1952. He was re-elected in 1953, and 1956. In each election, against several opponents, his popular vote exceeded 50% of the votes cast including his last after he lost his cabinet position.

Sommers resigned his seat automatically upon his conviction on November 7, 1958, for bribery and conspiracy.

== Scandal and trial ==
Sommers downfall began when the Liberal opposition, particularly MLA Gordon Gibson accused Sommers of impropriety in the granting of a forest management licence to E. P. Taylor's British Columbia Forest Products (BCFP).

These licences were a new form of tenure in the forests of British Columbia introduced in 1948 based on the 1944 recommendations of the Sloan Commission. Large companies were given cutting rights over Crown land in perpetuity and in exchange were responsible for forest management, construction of access roads and fire fighting. The goal was to provide a sustained yield to supply mills over the long term by giving the licence holder a long-term interest in the productivity of the land. Forest management licences were extremely valuable. There were accusations that companies made huge profits selling shares issued after a licence was granted before a single tree had been cut. E. P. Taylor's Argus Corporation, which incorporated British Columbia Forest Products to run its BC forest operations in 1946, had been turned down for a forest management licence in 1948. After he became the cabinet minister in charge of granting forest management licences, Sommers, who was then in awkward financial circumstances personally, had meetings with Taylor and the management of Argus at which BCFP sought a licence. Taylor, BC premier W. A. C. Bennett and Sommers met at the Empress Hotel in January 1955. Afterwards, Bennett directed Sommers to make the deal. The result was that BCFP was granted FML #22 which covered 250,000 acres (1,000 km^{2}) between Port Renfrew and Estevan Point along the west coast of Vancouver Island.

A commission led by Justice Arthur Lord found no basis for the charges and Sommers responded to the accusations by suing Vancouver lawyer David Sturdy for libel. The Bennett government stonewalled in the legislature on the basis that the matter was before the courts until Sommers was dropped from cabinet in 1956. In November 1957 he was arrested and charged with bribery. The next year, he and Wick Gray were convicted. BCFP was acquitted. Sommers was sentenced to 5 years in prison but was released after 28 months. While imprisoned, he learned the piano tuning trade. He established a piano business on Vancouver Island after his release in 1961. Sommers was convicted on five of seven charges of receiving bribes. He was found to have received $607 worth of rugs, $3,000 in bonds, $1,000 in cash and $2,500 sent by telegraph making him the first person in the Commonwealth found guilty of conspiring to accept bribes while serving as a Minister.

== Aftermath ==
During his time in prison, Sommers learned the trade of piano tuning and restoration from a fellow inmate. He took up residence on Vancouver Island after his release and established a business in that field. Sommers died at the age of 89 at a hospital in Nanaimo, British Columbia on October 28, 2000.

Preceded by Alexander Douglas Turnbull	MLA for Rossland-Trail; 1952–1958	Succeeded by Donald Leslie Brothers

Preceded by	Minister of Lands, Forests and Mines; 1952–1956	Succeeded by Ray Gillis Williston
