= Richard Ronald Burns =

Canadian politician (1874–1950)

Member of the Legislative Assembly of British Columbia
- In office 1933–1941
- Preceded by: James Hargrave Schofield
- Succeeded by: Herbert Wilfred Herridge
- Constituency: Rossland-Trail

Personal details
- Born: January 29, 1874 Rochester, Kent, England
- Died: June 14, 1950 (aged 76) Victoria, British Columbia
- Party: British Columbia Liberal Party
- Spouse: Eveline Moore
- Children: 3
- Occupation: Druggist

Richard Ronald Burns (January 29, 1874 – June 14, 1950) was a Canadian politician. He served in the Legislative Assembly of British Columbia from 1933 to 1941 from the electoral district of Rossland-Trail, a member of the Liberal party. Following his defeat in the 1941 provincial election, he never did seek reelection again to a third term in the Legislature.
