= Roly Russell =

Canadian politician

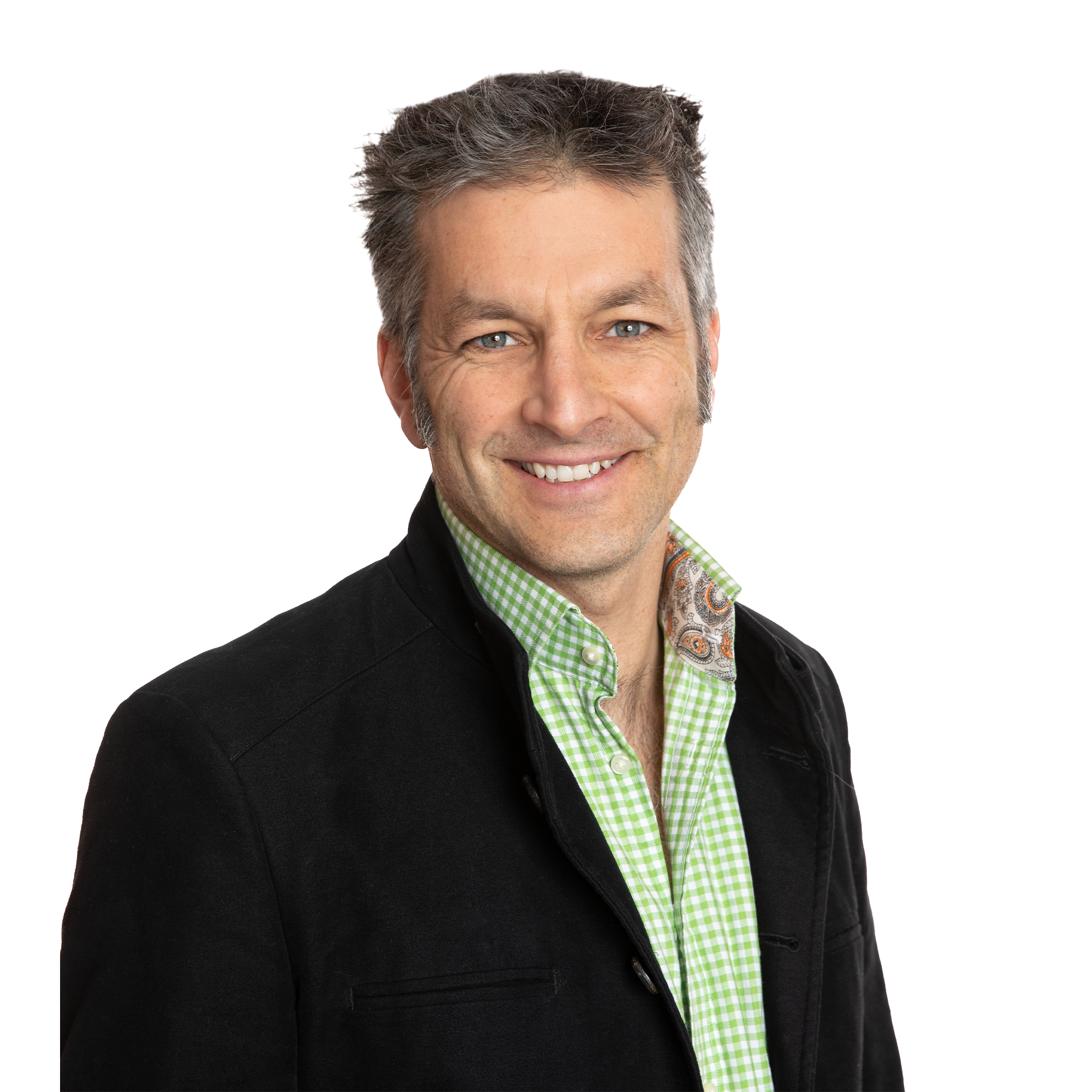

Parliamentary Secretary for Rural Development of British Columbia
- In office November 26, 2020 – September 21, 2024
- Premier: John Horgan; David Eby
- Preceded by: Position created
- Succeeded by: Steve Morissette

Member of the Legislative Assembly of British Columbia for Boundary-Similkameen
- In office October 24, 2020 – September 21, 2024
- Preceded by: Linda Larson
- Succeeded by: Donegal Wilson

Director of the Regional District of Kootenay Boundary for Electoral Area 'D'/Rural Grand Forks
- In office January, 2013 – November, 2020
- Preceded by: Irene Perepolkin
- Succeeded by: Danna O’Donnell

Personal details
- Born: October 9, 1976 (age 50)
- Party: New Democratic
- Occupation: Farmer

Roly Russell is a Canadian politician, who was elected to the Legislative Assembly of British Columbia in the 2020 British Columbia general election. He represented the electoral district of Boundary-Similkameen as a member of the British Columbia New Democratic Party.

In the 2024 British Columbia general election, he was unseated by Donegal Wilson from the BC Conservative Party.

== Early life and career ==
Russell was born and raised in rural Grand Forks. He obtained a PhD in marine ecology from Oregon State University. Throughout the 2010s, Russell has worked as a farmer and within local politics. He was the chair of his local credit union as well as the president of the Association of Kootenay Local Governments. He founded and works for the independent research organization Sandhill Institute for Complexity and Sustainability.

In 2013, Roly Russell was elected as a director for the rural Grand Forks area in the Regional District of Kootenay Boundary. As chair of the board of directors of the regional district in 2018, he assisted in obtaining federal and provincial help for emergency operations following flooding in Grand Forks.

== Provincial political career ==
In September 2020, Russell was announced as the BC NDP candidate for the riding of Boundary-Similkameen in the 2020 provincial election. He defeated the BC Liberal Party candidate Petra Veintimilla, who's party held the seat. Russell was appointed as the Parliamentary Secretary for Rural Development by John Horgan in November. Due to the on-going COVID-19 pandemic Russell was sworn in virtually.

Russell ran for re-election for the 2024 provincial election under the NDP but lost to BC Conservative candidate Donegal Wilson. He is ran and lost re-election in 2026.

== Electoral record ==
2026 British Columbia general election: Boundary-Similkameen
Party	Candidate	Votes	%	±%	Expenditures
Conservative	Donegal Wilson	11,465	52.38	+3.99	
New Democratic	Roly Russell	8,870	40.52	-2.04	
OneBC	Keith Pomeroy	1,495	6.83	-	
Total valid votes		21,830	99.74		
Total rejected ballots		58	0.26		
Turnout					
Registered voters					
Conservative hold		Swing		+3.01	
Source: Elections BC

2024 British Columbia general election: Boundary-Similkameen
Party	Candidate	Votes	%	±%	Expenditures
Conservative	Donegal Wilson	11,935	48.39	+37.21	$33,102.59
New Democratic	Roly Russell	10,497	42.56	−7.29	$60,076.63
Green	Kevin Eastwood	1,454	5.89	–	$574.99
Independent	Sean Taylor	779	3.16	–	$1,380.30
Total valid votes/expense limit		24,665	99.85	–	$71,700.08
Total rejected ballots		36	0.15	–	
Turnout		24,701	62.74	+5.90	
Registered voters		39,371			
Conservative gain from New Democratic		Swing		+22.25	
Source: Elections BC

2020 British Columbia general election: Boundary-Similkameen
Party	Candidate	Votes	%	±%	Expenditures
New Democratic	Roly Russell	10,500	49.85	+17.12	$22,881.87
Liberal	Petra Veintimilla	7,735	36.72	−6.08	$47,872.88
Conservative	Darryl Seres	2,354	11.18	–	$2,932.14
Wexit	Arlyn Greig	474	2.25	–	$4.00
Total valid votes		21,063	99.02	–	
Total rejected ballots		208	0.99	+0.54	
Turnout		21,271	56.84	–7.96	
Registered voters		37,421			
New Democratic gain from Liberal		Swing		+11.60	
Source: Elections BC
