= James O'Donnell Quinn =

Canadian politician

Member of the Legislative Assembly of British Columbia
- In office 1948–1949
- Preceded by: James Lockhart Webster
- Succeeded by: Alexander Douglas Turnbull
- Constituency: Rossland-Trail

Personal details
- Born: 1906 Scotland
- Party: Co-operative Commonwealth Federation
- Spouse: Olive Hoggart
- Occupation: Miner

James O'Donnell Quinn (1906 – ??) was a Scottish-born miner and political figure in British Columbia. He represented Rossland-Trail in the Legislative Assembly of British Columbia from 1948 to 1949 as a Co-operative Commonwealth Federation (CCF) member.

He came to Canada, settling in Trail, British Columbia. Quinn was elected to the provincial assembly in a 1948 by-election held following the death of James Lockhart Webster. He was defeated by Alexander Douglas Turnbull when he ran for reelection in 1949. He never sought election to the Legislature again.
