= Lyle Kristiansen =

Canadian politician (1939–2015)

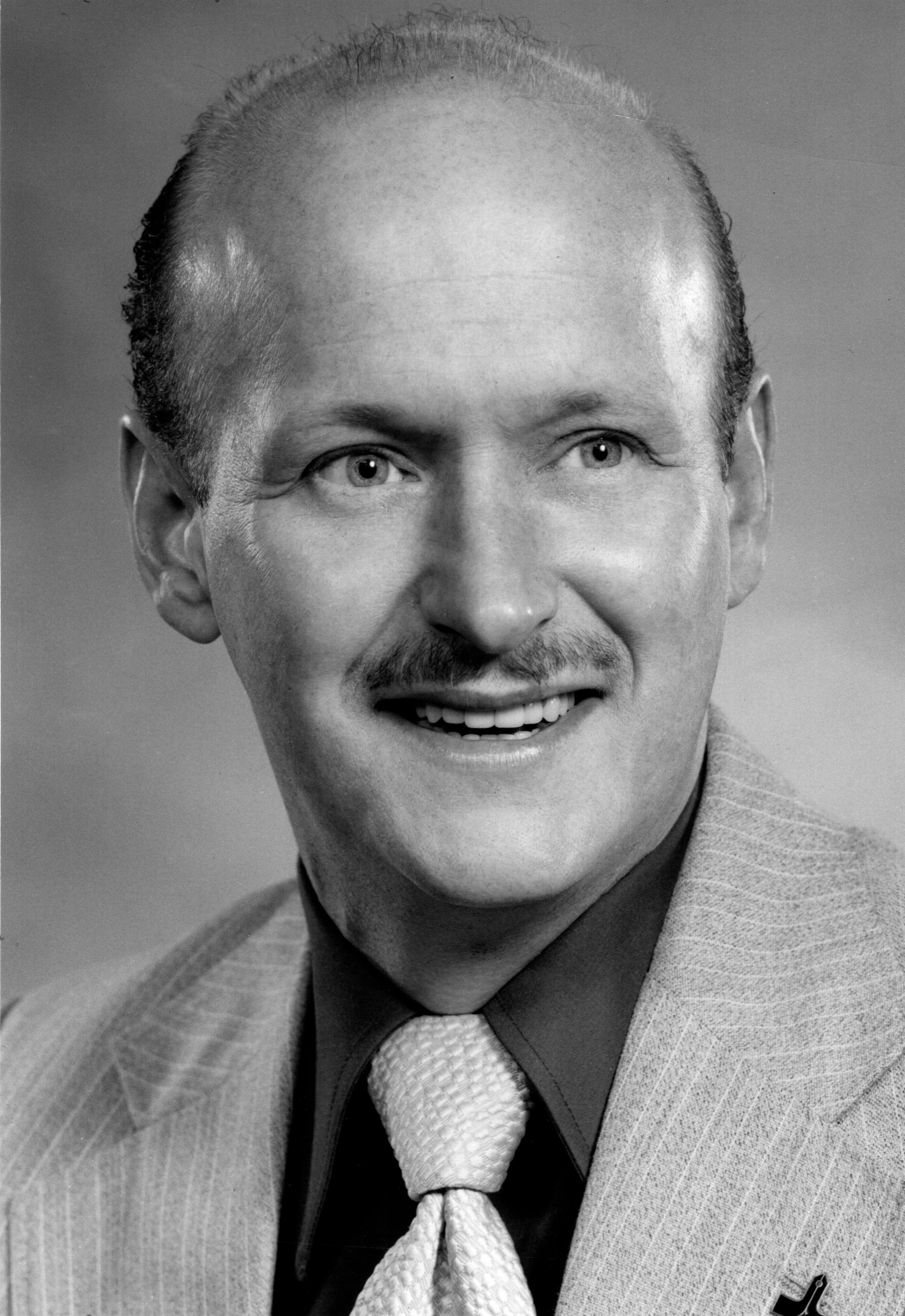

Member of Parliament for Kootenay West—Revelstoke
- In office November 21, 1988 – September 8, 1993
- Preceded by: Robert Brisco
- Succeeded by: Jim Gouk

Member of Parliament for Kootenay West
- In office February 18, 1980 – July 9, 1984
- Preceded by: Robert Brisco
- Succeeded by: Robert Brisco

Personal details
- Born: May 9, 1939 Vancouver, British Columbia, Canada
- Died: June 18, 2015 (aged 76)
- Party: New Democratic Party

Lyle Stuart Kristiansen (May 9, 1939 – June 18, 2015) was a Canadian New Democratic Party member of the House of Commons. He was an executive secretary, financial secretary and woodworker by career.

His first two attempts at a House of Commons seat from British Columbia were unsuccessful. He first campaigned federally in the 1965 federal election at Vancouver Centre electoral district. He would not run again until the 1979 federal election at Kootenay West.

Kirstiansen was successful in his third federal attempt in 1980 election at Kootenay West. He lost this seat in the 1984 general election, but returned to Ottawa after the 1988 federal election at the Kootenay West--Revelstoke riding. Kristiansen did not contest another federal election and left federal politics in 1993. He served in the 32nd and 34th Canadian Parliaments.

In his later years, Lyle became the BCFORUM Representative on the Sunshine Coast Labour Council, where he was considered both an asset, and a friend by all who served on the council with him.

Kristiansen died on June 18, 2015, at the age of 76.

== Electoral record ==
1988 Canadian federal election: Kootenay West—Revelstoke
Party	Candidate	Votes	%
New Democratic	Lyle Kristiansen	16,381	46.54
Progressive Conservative	Bob Brisco	12,667	35.98
Liberal	Garry R. Jenkins	5,479	15.56
Green	Michael Brown	674	1.91
Total valid votes		35,201	100.00
This riding was created from part of Kootenay West, where Progressive Conservative Robert Brisco was the incumbent.

1984 Canadian federal election: Kootenay West
Party	Candidate	Votes	%	±%
Progressive Conservative	Robert Brisco	15,804	47.43	+7.27
New Democratic	Lyle Kristiansen	15,060	45.19	+2.15
Liberal	Jean Turnbull	2,460	7.38	-9.40
Total valid votes		33,324	100.0	
Progressive Conservative gain from New Democratic		Swing		+2.56

1980 Canadian federal election: Kootenay West
Party	Candidate	Votes	%	±%
New Democratic	Lyle Kristiansen	12,232	43.04	+3.21
Progressive Conservative	Bob Brisco	11,417	40.16	-7.08
Liberal	Peter M. Kendall	4,769	16.78	+4.26
Total valid votes		28,418	100.0	
New Democratic gain from Progressive Conservative		Swing		+5.14

1979 Canadian federal election: Kootenay West
Party	Candidate	Votes	%	±%
Progressive Conservative	Robert Brisco	13,645	47.24	+5.67
New Democratic	Lyle S. Kristiansen	11,503	39.83	+1.47
Liberal	Peter M. Kendall	3,616	12.52	-7.56
Libertarian	Valerie Phare-Smith	119	0.41	–
Total valid votes		28,883	100.0	
Progressive Conservative hold		Swing		+2.10

1965 Canadian federal election: Vancouver Centre
Party	Candidate	Votes	%	±%
Liberal	Jack R. Nicholson	9,008	40.08	+0.75
Progressive Conservative	Douglas Jung	6,248	27.80	−2.73
New Democratic	Lyle Kristiansen	5,184	23.07	−1.13
Social Credit	William John McIntyre	1,806	8.04	+2.10
Independent Social Credit	James B. Wisbey	228	1.01	–
Total valid votes		22,474	100.0	
Liberal hold		Swing		+1.74
