= Bill Barlee =

Canadian politician (1932–2012)

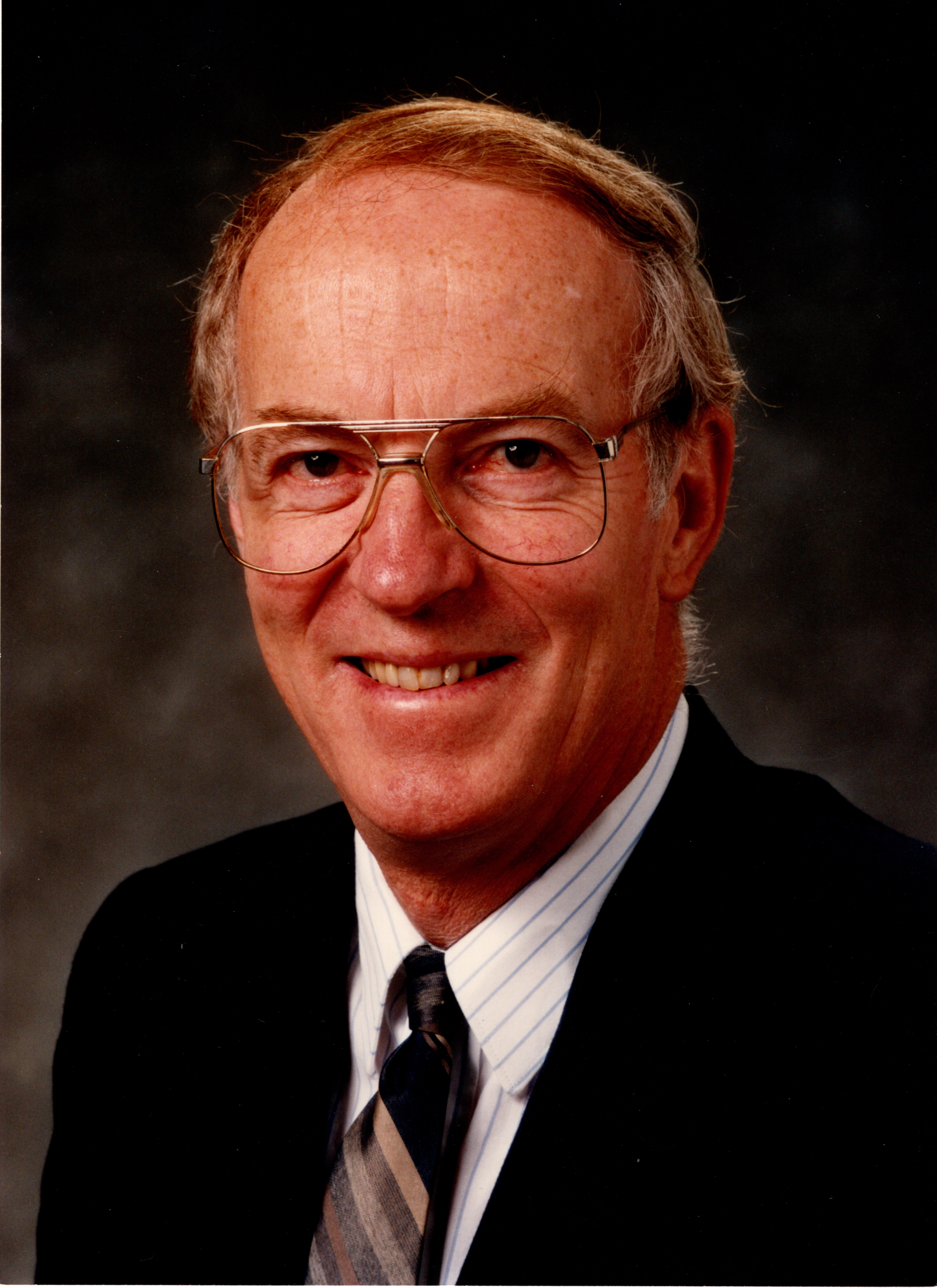

Member of the British Columbia Legislative Assembly for Okanagan-Boundary Boundary-Similkameen (1988-1991)
- In office June 8, 1988 – May 28, 1996 Serving with Ivan Messmer (1986-1991)
- Preceded by: Jim Hewitt
- Succeeded by: Bill Barisoff

Minister of Agriculture, Fisheries and Food of British Columbia
- In office November 5, 1991 – September 15, 1993
- Premier: Michael Harcourt
- Preceded by: Larry Chalmers
- Succeeded by: David Zirnhelt

Minister of Small Business, Tourism and Culture of British Columbia
- In office September 15, 1993 – June 17, 1996
- Premier: Michael Harcourt; Glen Clark
- Preceded by: David Zirnhelt
- Succeeded by: Penny Priddy

Personal details
- Born: Neville Langrell Barlee; October 6, 1932 Grand Forks, British Columbia, Canada
- Died: June 14, 2012 (aged 79) Victoria, British Columbia, Canada
- Party: British Columbia New Democratic Party; Liberal Party of Canada

Neville Langrell "Bill" Barlee (October 6, 1932 – June 14, 2012) was a Canadian politician who was first elected to the Legislative Assembly of British Columbia as a New Democrat in 1988. He served as Minister of Agriculture, Fisheries and Food from 1991 until 1993 and then as Minister of Small Business, Tourism and Culture from 1993 until his defeat in the 1996 provincial election.

== Biography ==
Barlee had a varied career as a high school teacher, writer, publisher, and placer miner. He left teaching to write, publish and become a small businessman. His history magazine Canada West had faithful subscribers and his books included two best-sellers: Gold Creeks and Ghost Towns and the Guide to Goldpanning. Over his life, he and his wife amassed a collection of Old West artifacts. Parts of the Barlee collection were placed on display in the Canadian Museum of Civilization in Ottawa as well as museums in British Columbia.Barlee was also well known for his popular TV show on the history of Canada West which he co-hosted with Mike Roberts. This award-winning television series Gold Trails and Ghost Towns, ran from 1986 to 1996 on five different networks nationwide. The show is still seen in reruns.

In 1988 (after unsuccessfully running in the 1969 and 1972 provincial elections), Barlee was elected as an NDP MLA. When the NDP became government, he was appointed Minister of Agriculture, Fisheries and Food. During his time as Agriculture Minister, Barlee conceived of, and implemented the successful "Buy BC" program, to support British Columbia farmers. The Buy BC logo can now be found on virtually all food products made or grown in British Columbia. He also served as Minister of Small Business, Tourism and Culture. Vancouver Sun columnist Denny Boyd credited Barlee as being one of the best Tourism Ministers British Columbia has ever had.

== Awards and honours ==
Barlee received a number of honours during his career including the "Golden Door" award from the BC and Yukon Hotel Association; the "Stellar Award" by the BC Restaurants and Food Services Association; and the "Visionary Award" from the BC Council of Tourism Associations. Barlee was also awarded the Queen's Golden Jubilee Medal in 2002.

== Election results ==
2000 Canadian federal election
Party	Candidate	Votes	%	±%	Expenditures
Alliance	Jim Gouk	19,386	46.69	-0.09	$42,724
Liberal	Bill Barlee	11,357	27.35	+9.88	$32,709
New Democratic	Don Scarlett	4,091	9.85	-12.04	$7,473
Green	Andrew Shadrack	2,689	6.47	+0.42	$14,652
Progressive Conservative	Michele Elise Duncan	2,147	5.17	-0.39	$3,532
Marijuana	Dan Loehndorf	889	2.14	–	$978
Canadian Action	Bev Collins	762	1.84	+0.91	$3,220
Natural Law	Annie Holtby	191	0.46	±0	$886
Total valid votes		41,512	100.0		
Total rejected ballots		238	0.57		
Turnout		41,750	64.86		
Alliance hold		Swing		-4.98	
Change for the Canadian Alliance is based on the Reform Party.

1988 By-Election: Boundary-Similkameen
Party	Candidate	Votes	%	±%
New Democratic	Bill Barlee	15,778	52.82	
Social Credit	Russ Fox	10,585	35.44	
Liberal	Judi Tyabji	3,144	10.53	
Green	Rus Domer	361	1.21	
Total Valid Votes		29,868	100.00	
Total rejected ballots		87		

== Works ==
- Barlee N.L. 1976 Historic Treasures and Lost Mines of British Columbia. Canada West Publications.
- Barlee, N.L. The Pictograph Country: Similkameen. S.l., 1966. Re-released as Similkameen: The Pictograph Country, self-published chapbook, 1978. Re-released as Similkameen: The Pictograph Country (Surrey: Hancock, 1989).
- Barlee, N.L. The Prospectors' and Collectors' Guide: Covering the Okanagan, Shuswap, Similkameen Boundary, South Thompson Areas. (n.d.)
- Barlee, N.L. South Okanagan: The Sagebrush Country (Canada West, n.d.).
- Barlee, N.L. Gold Creeks and Ghost Towns: East Kootenay, Boundary, West Kootenay, Okanagan and Similkameen (Canada West Magazine, 1970?; Canada West Publications, 1980; Hancock House, 1984).
- Barlee, N.L. The Guide to Gold Panning in British Columbia Gold Regions, Methods of Mining, etc (Summerland: N.L. Barlee, 1972, 1974; Summerland: Canada West, 1977; Victoria: Canada West Publications 1979, 1980; Blaine, WA: Big Country, 1984; Hancock House, 1993).
- Barlee, N.L. (editor). The Best of Canada West (Langley: Stagecoach Publishing, 1978).
- Barlee, N.L. West Kootenay: Ghost Town Country (Canada West Publications, 1984).
- Barlee, N.L. Gold Creeks and Ghost Towns of Northeastern Washington (Barlee, 1988; Hancock House, 1999).
- Barlee, N.L. Lost Mines and Historic Treasures (Hancock House, 1993).
