= Robert Brisco =

Canadian politician

Robert Brisco D.C.

Member of the Canadian Parliament for Kootenay West (1974-1980 and 1984-1988)
- In office 1974–1980
- Preceded by: Randolph Harding
- Succeeded by: Lyle Kristiansen
- In office 1984–1988
- Preceded by: Lyle Kristansen
- Succeeded by: Riding abolished in 1987 when it was merged into Kootenay West—Revelstoke

Personal details
- Born: Robert Hylton Brisco; 29 December 1928 Victoria, British Columbia, Canada
- Died: 4 January 2004 (aged 75)
- Party: Progressive Conservative Party
- Occupation: chiropractor
- Website: Robert Brisco – Parliament of Canada biography

Robert Hylton Brisco, D.C. (29 December 1928 – 4 January 2004) was a Progressive Conservative party member of the House of Commons of Canada. Brisco was born in Victoria, British Columbia and became a chiropractor.

He first attempted to enter national politics at the Kootenay West electoral district in the 1972 federal election, but was defeated. His next attempt was successful, winning the riding in the 1974 federal election, then winning re-election in the 1979. In 1976, he was the Critic for Economic and Regional Development. He lost the seat in the 1980 federal election to Lyle Kristiansen of the New Democratic Party, but regained the seat in the 1984 elections.

He was a member of numerous standing committees including Chairman of the Canadian House of Commons Standing Committee on Environment and Forestry and Chairman of the Legislative Committee on Bill-90. He was Vice-Chairman of the Canadian House of Commons Standing Committee on Regional Industrial Expansion, the Standing Joint Committee on the Printing of Parliament and a member of other committees.

Brisco's seat became Kootenay West—Revelstoke before the 1988 federal election in which he lost again to Kristiansen. Brisco served in the 30th, 31st and 33rd Canadian Parliaments. He did not contest another national election after his 1988 defeat.
