= Donegal Wilson =

Canadian politician

The Honourable Donegal Wilson MLA

Minister of Water, Land, and Natural Resource Operations of British Columbia
- Incumbent
- Assumed office November 20, 2026
- Premier: Lorne Doerkson
- Preceded by: Randene Neill

Member of the British Columbia Legislative Assembly for Boundary-Similkameen
- Incumbent
- Assumed office October 19, 2024
- Preceded by: Roly Russell

Personal details
- Party: BC Conservatives (before 2026, 2026–present)
- Other political affiliations: Independent (2026); CentreBC (2026)

Donegal Wilson MLA is a Canadian politician who has served as a member of the Legislative Assembly of British Columbia (MLA) representing the electoral district of Boundary-Similkameen since 2024. She is a member of the Conservative Party.

== Early life and career ==
Wilson was born in Summerland, British Columbia, and raised on a cattle ranch in the Otter Valley near Tulameen. She attended Princeton Secondary School before attending community college in Northwest BC, beginning a career in administration shortly after.

Her career in administration began with small businesses and non-profit organizations. Before founding Direct Performance with her husband, she worked for Central Mountain Air. In 2012, Wilson became the executive director of the B.C. Snowmobile Federation, leading efforts to strengthen organized snowmobiling by collaborating with government, industry, and community organizations. During her time with the federation she sat on ministerial committees, helped develop the Off-Road Vehicle Act, and worked with government as a stakeholder for 12 years. Her community service experience includes being a long-time advocate for outdoor recreation. She lived in Smithers for 15 years before moving back to the Similkameen Valley. Wilson currently lives with her husband in Keremeos. Together, they operate a small engine business.

== Political career ==
In August 2024, Wilson was announced as the BC Conservatives candidate for the riding of Boundary-Similkameen in the 2024 provincial election. When the election was held, Wilson defeated BC NDP incumbent Roly Russell, who had been the MLA for the riding since 2020, as well as Green candidate Kevin Eastwood and Independent Sean Taylor. She has served in the official opposition's shadow cabinet as the Critic for Water, Land and Resource Stewardship.

In September 2026, she resigned from the BC Conservatives caucus to sit as an independent, the eighth such defection since mid-August 2026. On September 18, Wilson and seven other MLAs joined CentreBC.

== Electoral history ==
2024 British Columbia general election: Boundary-Similkameen
Party	Candidate	Votes	%	±%	Expenditures
Conservative	Donegal Wilson	11,935	48.39	+37.21	$33,102.59
New Democratic	Roly Russell	10,497	42.56	−7.29	$60,076.63
Green	Kevin Eastwood	1,454	5.89	–	$574.99
Independent	Sean Taylor	779	3.16	–	$1,380.30
Total valid votes/expense limit		24,665	99.85	–	$71,700.08
Total rejected ballots		36	0.15	–	
Turnout		24,701	62.74	+5.90	
Registered voters		39,371			
Conservative gain from New Democratic		Swing		+22.25	
Source: Elections BC

== See also ==
- 43rd Parliament of British Columbia
