= Jim Beattie (politician) =

Canadian politician (born 1948)

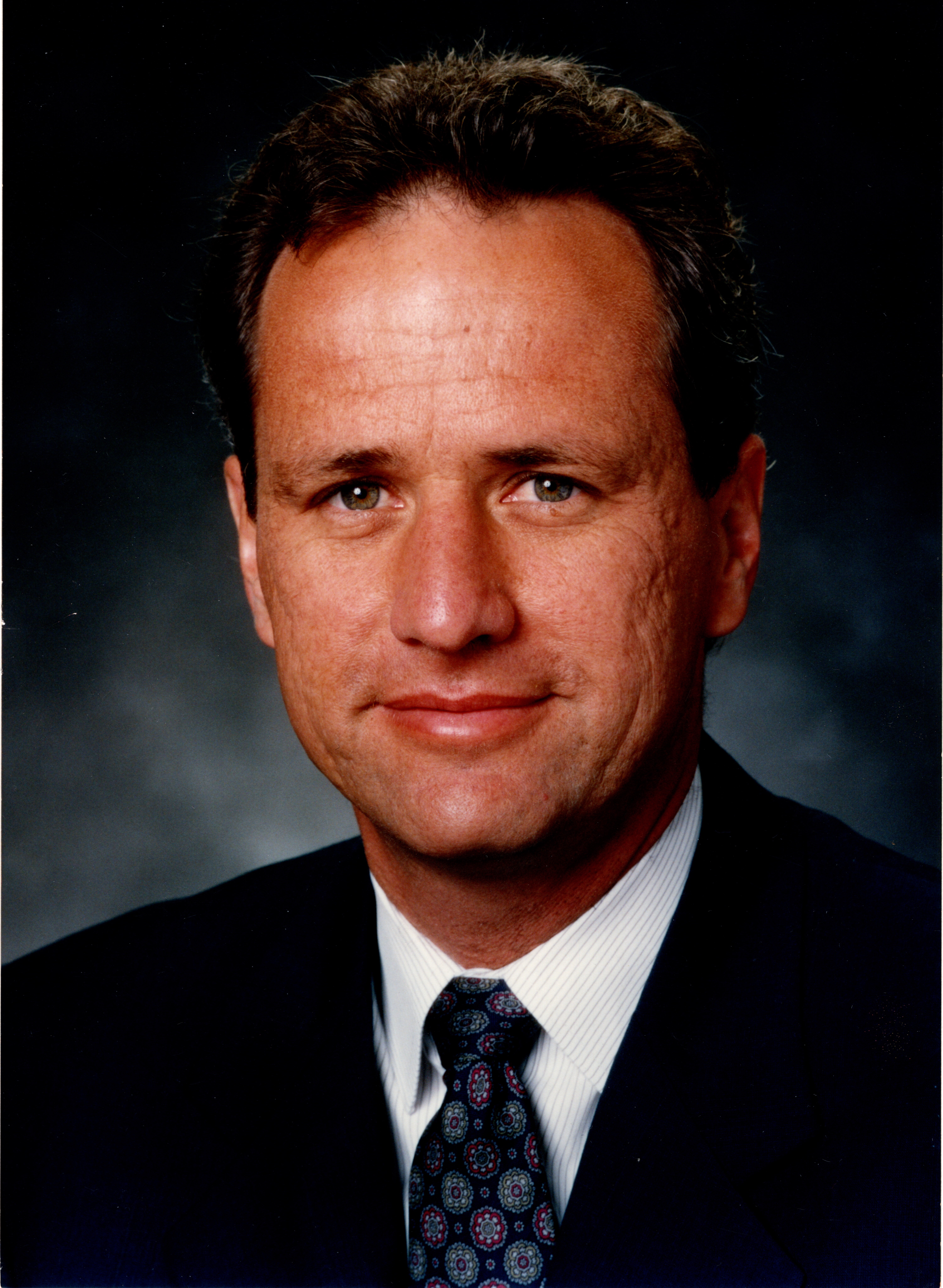

MLA for Okanagan-Penticton
- In office 1991–1996

Personal details
- Born: October 26, 1948 (age 77) Hamilton, Ontario
- Party: British Columbia New Democratic Party

James Leslie Sean Beattie (born October 26, 1948) was a Canadian politician. He served in the Legislative Assembly of British Columbia from 1991 to 1996, as a NDP member for the constituency of Okanagan-Penticton. He was defeated in the 1996 provincial election and has never sought reelection provincially since.
