= Herbert Wilfred Herridge =

Canadian politician (1895–1973)

Member of Parliament for Kootenay West
- In office 1945–1968
- Preceded by: William Esling
- Succeeded by: Randolph Harding

Member of the Legislative Assembly of British Columbia
- In office 1941–1945
- Preceded by: Richard Ronald Burns
- Succeeded by: James Lockhart Webster
- Constituency: Rossland-Trail

Personal details
- Born: February 28, 1895 London, England
- Died: October 19, 1973 (aged 78)
- Party: Independent Co-operative Commonwealth/CCF / NDP
- Occupation: forest farmer

Herbert Wilfred (Bert) Herridge (February 28, 1895 – October 19, 1973) was a Canadian politician and Member of Parliament.

Born in London, England, Herridge immigrated to Canada with his family in 1906; after stopping in Winnipeg, they settled in Nakusp, British Columbia. He attended the Ontario Agricultural College from 1909 to 1914 when he enlisted in 54th (Kootenay) Battalion of the Canadian Army during World War I.

He was wounded at the Battle of the Somme in 1916. While recuperating at a military hospital in Devon, he met his future wife. Herridge returned to Canada where he took over the family's tree farm and helped found the Great War Veterans' Association. Herridge became active in the British Columbia Liberal Party becoming vice-president in 1932 and then president the next year. He then quit the Liberals to join the newly formed Co-operative Commonwealth Federation in 1934. Herridge ran for the CCF in Kootenay West in the 1935 federal election and again in the 1940 federal election placing second each time and losing by less than 400 votes in his later attempt.

In the 1941 provincial election he won a seat in the British Columbia Legislative Assembly becoming the CCF Member of the Legislative Assembly for Rossland-Trail. He had previously been an unsuccessful candidate in the 1937 provincial election in the Kaslo-Slocan electoral district.

Herridge resigned his seat in order to run federally once again as CCF candidate in Kootenay West in the 1945 federal election but did so in violation of an order of the British Columbia Council of the CCF. As a result, he was expelled from the party and ran instead as an independent "People's CCF" candidate. He was elected while the official CCF candidate placed fourth. In 1948, Herridge was readmitted into the CCF and he was re-elected in the 1949 federal election as the official CCF standard-bearer. Herridge served for almost 23 years in the House of Commons of Canada winning eight successive elections, the last three as a New Democrat.

Herridge served on the Standing Committee on Veterans Affairs for 23 years and also served at various times on the Standing Committee on External Affairs and the Standing Committee on Agriculture, Forestry and Rural Development. He was the only NDP MP to vote against changing the Canadian flag from the Canadian Red Ensign to the Maple Leaf.

Herridge was also president of the Nakusp-Galena Bay Telephone Company. Besides operating a tree farm, he also at various times raised cattle, grew fruit and operated a sawmill.

He was a long-time opponent of the Columbia River Treaty with the United States.

== Archives ==
There is a Herbert Herridge fonds at Library and Archives Canada. Archival reference number is R4859. There is also a Herbert Herridge fonds at the Selkirk College Archives.
