= West Kootenay-Boundary =

Defunct provincial electoral district in British Columbia, Canada

West Kootenay-Boundary was a provincial electoral district for the Legislative Assembly of British Columbia, Canada, from 2001 to 2009.

The seat combined the Rossland/Trail/Castlegar area (the putative West Kootenay component) that had previously been in Rossland-Trail with the Boundary Country, which had been in the Okanagan-Boundary riding (1991–1996) and prior to that the Boundary-Similkameen riding.

== Demographics ==
Population, 2001	44,794
Population Change, 1996–2001	-2.6%
Area (km^{2})	9,926
Pop. Density (people per km^{2})	4.5

== Members of the Legislative Assembly ==
Its Member of the Legislative Assembly (|MLA) was Katrine Conroy, who was first elected in 2005 and represented the New Democratic Party of British Columbia.

== Election results ==
B.C. General Election 2005 West Kootenay-Boundary
Party	Candidate	Votes	%	±	Expenditures
NDP	Katrine Conroy	13,318	60.26%		$51,387
Liberal	Pam Lewin	6,180	27.96%		$97,658
Green	Donald Pharand	1,561	7.06%	–	$1,879
Conservative	Barry Edward Chilton	802	3.63%		$1,170
No Affiliation	Glen David Millar	180	0.81%		$100
Bloc	A.J. van Leur	59	0.27%		$100
Total valid votes		22,100			
Total rejected ballots		123	0.56%		
Turnout		22,223	68.6%		

B.C. General Election 2001: West Kootenay-Boundary
Party	Candidate	Votes	%	±	Expenditures
Liberal	Sandy Santori	10,784	49.74%		$48,035
NDP	Ed Conroy	6,915	31.89%		$26,686
Green	Patricia Pépé	2,004	9.24%	–	$961
Unity	Mark McLaren	1,139	5.25%		$3,582
Marijuana	Brian Taylor	840	3.88%		$100
Total valid votes		21,682	100.00%		
Total rejected ballots		71	0.33%		
Turnout		21,753	74.42%		

== See also ==
- List of British Columbia provincial electoral districts
- Canadian provincial electoral districts
- List of electoral districts in the Kootenays
