= Levi William Humphrey =

Canadian politician

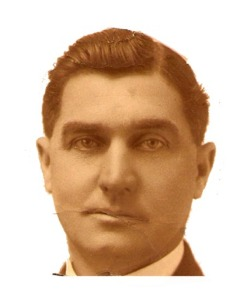

Member of Parliament for Kootenay West
- In office December 1921 – September 1925
- Preceded by: Robert Francis Green
- Succeeded by: William Esling

Personal details
- Born: 29 April 1881 Monson, Maine, United States
- Died: 19 September 1947 (aged 66) Nelson, British Columbia
- Party: Progressive
- Spouse: Anne Ogwen Hughes
- Children: William John Humphrey
- Profession: locomotive engineer

Levi William Humphrey (29 April 1881 – 19 September 1947) was a Progressive party member of the House of Commons of Canada. He was born in Monson, Maine, United States and became a locomotive engineer for Canadian Pacific Railways.

Humphrey, the son of David Humphrey, came to Canada in 1898, initially settling in Rossland, British Columbia Rossland which was the terminus for Canadian Pacific Railways. He later moved to Nelson, British Columbia where he resided until his death in 1947. He served overseas with the Canadian Expeditionary Force from 1915 to 1919. In 1918, he married Anne Ogwen Hughes. He was elected to Parliament at the Kootenay West riding in the 1921 general election. After serving his only federal term, the 14th Canadian Parliament, Humphrey was defeated by William Esling of the Conservatives in the 1925 federal election.
