= Jim Gouk =

Canadian politician (1946–2025)

James William Gouk (April 15, 1946 – May 27, 2025) was a Canadian politician. He served as a Member of Parliament (MP) from 1993 to 2006.

== Life and career ==
Born in Toronto, Gouk moved west as a young man and began his political career as an alderman in Castlegar, British Columbia. Gouk would enter federal politics in 1993 when he was elected into the House of Commons of Canada. In the 1993 Canadian federal election he was elected in Kootenay West—Revelstoke for the Reform Party of Canada. In the 1997 Canadian federal election he was elected for the West Kootenay—Okanagan riding. In the 2000 Canadian federal election, Gouk was elected after joining the Canadian Alliance, the successor party to Reform, from the Kootenay—Boundary—Okanagan riding. He was elected a fourth time in the 2004 Canadian federal election in the riding of British Columbia Southern Interior, this time for the Conservative Party of Canada. An air traffic controller, businessman and realtor, he had been an opposition critic of Transport, Public Works and Government Services, Labour, and Via Rail before retiring from politics at the dissolution of parliament prior to the 2006 Canadian federal election.

Gouk died on May 27, 2025, after a three-year battle with cancer. He was 79 years old.

Parliament of Canada
Preceded by Lyle Kristiansen	Member of Parliament for Kootenay West—Revelstoke; 1993–1997	Succeeded by District Abolished
Preceded by New District	Member of Parliament for Kootenay—Boundary—Okanagan; 1997–2004	Succeeded by District Abolished
Preceded by New District	Member of Parliament for British Columbia Southern Interior; 2004–2006	Succeeded by Alex Atamanenko
