= Kootenay West =

Former federal electoral district in British Columbia, Canada

British Columbia electoral district

Defunct federal electoral district
- Legislature: House of Commons
- District created: 1914
- District abolished: 1987
- First contested: 1917
- Last contested: 1984

Kootenay West was a federal electoral district in British Columbia, Canada, that was represented in the House of Commons of Canada from 1917 to 1988.

This riding was created in 1914 from parts of Kootenay riding. It was abolished in 1987 when it was merged into Kootenay West—Revelstoke riding.

== Members of Parliament ==
Parliament	Years	Member	Party
Riding created from Kootenay
13th	1917–1921	Robert Francis Green	Government (Unionist)
14th	1921–1925	Levi William Humphrey	Progressive
15th	1925–1926	William Esling	Conservative
16th	1926–1930	William Esling	Conservative
17th	1930–1935	William Esling	Conservative
18th	1935–1940	William Esling	Conservative
19th	1940–1945	William Esling	National Government
20th	1945–1949	Herbert Wilfred Herridge	Independent Co-operative Commonwealth
21st	1949–1953	Herbert Wilfred Herridge	Co-operative Commonwealth
22nd	1953–1957	Herbert Wilfred Herridge	Co-operative Commonwealth
23rd	1957–1958	Herbert Wilfred Herridge	Co-operative Commonwealth
24th	1958–1961	Herbert Wilfred Herridge	Co-operative Commonwealth
24th	1961–1962	Herbert Wilfred Herridge	New Democratic
25th	1962–1963	Herbert Wilfred Herridge	New Democratic
26th	1963–1965	Herbert Wilfred Herridge	New Democratic
27th	1965–1968	Herbert Wilfred Herridge	New Democratic
28th	1968–1972	Randolph Harding	New Democratic
29th	1972–1974	Randolph Harding	New Democratic
30th	1974–1979	Robert Brisco	Progressive Conservative
31st	1979–1980	Robert Brisco	Progressive Conservative
32nd	1980–1984	Lyle Kristiansen	New Democratic
33rd	1984–1988	Robert Brisco	Progressive Conservative
Riding dissolved into Kootenay West—Revelstoke

== Election results ==
1984 Canadian federal election
Party	Candidate	Votes	%	±%
Progressive Conservative	Robert Brisco	15,804	47.43	+7.25
New Democratic	Lyle Kristiansen	15,060	45.19	+2.15
Liberal	Jean Turnbull	2,460	7.38	–9.40
Total valid votes		33,324	99.69	
Total rejected ballots		102	0.31	–0.05
Turnout		33,426	82.54	+11.64
Eligible voters		40,495		
Progressive Conservative gain from New Democratic		Swing		+2.56
Source: Elections Canada

1980 Canadian federal election
Party	Candidate	Votes	%	±%
New Democratic	Lyle Kristiansen	12,232	43.04	+3.22
Progressive Conservative	Robert Brisco	11,417	40.18	–7.07
Liberal	Peter M. Kendall	4,769	16.78	+4.26
Total valid votes		28,418	99.65	
Total rejected ballots		100	0.35	+0.06
Turnout		28,518	70.90	–4.15
Eligible voters		40,223		
New Democratic gain from Progressive Conservative		Swing		+5.15
Source: Elections Canada

1979 Canadian federal election
Party	Candidate	Votes	%	±%
Progressive Conservative	Robert Brisco	13,645	47.24	+5.67
New Democratic	Lyle Kristiansen	11,503	39.83	+1.47
Liberal	Peter M. Kendall	3,616	12.52	–7.56
Libertarian	Valerie Phare-Smith	119	0.41	–
Total valid votes		28,883	99.71	
Total rejected ballots		85	0.29	–0.11
Turnout		28,968	75.04	+3.15
Eligible voters		38,601		
Progressive Conservative hold		Swing		+2.10
Source: Elections Canada

1974 Canadian federal election
Party	Candidate	Votes	%	±%
Progressive Conservative	Robert Brisco	12,575	41.57	+10.01
New Democratic	Randolph Harding	11,603	38.36	–15.21
Liberal	Louis D. Maglio	6,073	20.08	+5.20
Total valid votes		30,251	99.60	
Total rejected ballots		122	0.40	–0.85
Turnout		30,373	71.90	–3.05
Eligible voters		42,245		
Progressive Conservative gain from New Democratic		Swing		+12.61
Source: Library of Parliament

1972 Canadian federal election
Party	Candidate	Votes	%	±%
New Democratic	Randolph Harding	15,633	53.57	+8.62
Progressive Conservative	Robert Brisco	9,210	31.56	+15.11
Liberal	Paul G. Moroso	4,341	14.87	–13.79
Total valid votes		29,184	98.75	
Total rejected ballots		370	1.25	+0.56
Turnout		29,554	74.95	–0.41
Eligible voters		39,431		
New Democratic hold		Swing		–3.24
Source: Library of Parliament

1968 Canadian federal election
Party	Candidate	Votes	%	±%
New Democratic	Randolph Harding	12,181	44.95	+5.86
Liberal	Donald F. Griffiths	7,768	28.67	+3.34
Progressive Conservative	Bruce Arnesen	4,457	16.45	+5.36
Social Credit	Edward L. Brothers	2,693	9.94	–14.55
Total valid votes		27,099	99.31	
Total rejected ballots		188	0.69	–0.12
Turnout		27,287	75.36	+6.31
Eligible voters		36,210		
New Democratic hold		Swing		+1.26
Source: Library of Parliament

1965 Canadian federal election
Party	Candidate	Votes	%	±%
New Democratic	Herbert Wilfred Herridge	8,481	39.09	+1.60
Liberal	George B. Cady	5,495	25.33	+4.60
Social Credit	John Hobson	5,313	24.49	+5.06
Progressive Conservative	T. Stan Horswill	2,405	11.09	–11.26
Total valid votes		21,694	99.20	
Total rejected ballots		176	0.80	+0.28
Turnout		21,870	69.05	–7.93
Eligible voters		31,675		
New Democratic hold		Swing		–1.50
Source: Library of Parliament

1963 Canadian federal election
Party	Candidate	Votes	%	±%
New Democratic	Herbert Wilfred Herridge	8,595	37.49	+0.67
Progressive Conservative	Peter Dewdney	5,122	22.34	–5.13
Liberal	George B. Cady	4,752	20.73	+8.66
Social Credit	Edith A. Van Maarion	4,455	19.43	–4.19
Total valid votes		22,924	99.47	
Total rejected ballots		122	0.53	–0.23
Turnout		23,046	76.98	+0.56
Eligible voters		29,939		
New Democratic hold		Swing		+2.90
Source: Library of Parliament

1962 Canadian federal election
Party	Candidate	Votes	%	±%
New Democratic	Herbert Wilfred Herridge	8,303	36.83	–6.63
Progressive Conservative	Peter Dewdney	6,194	27.47	–10.42
Social Credit	Leslie A. Read	5,327	23.63	+15.57
Liberal	Nicholas T. Oglow	2,722	12.07	+1.48
Total valid votes		22,546	99.24	
Total rejected ballots		173	0.76	+0.17
Turnout		22,719	76.42	–1.72
Eligible voters		29,731		
New Democratic hold		Swing		+1.90
Source: Library of Parliament

1958 Canadian federal election
Party	Candidate	Votes	%	±%
Co-operative Commonwealth	Herbert Wilfred Herridge	9,460	43.46	–0.33
Progressive Conservative	Peter Dewdney	8,248	37.89	+20.98
Liberal	William J. McLoughlin	2,306	10.59	–2.57
Social Credit	J.H. (Harry) Almack	1,753	8.05	–18.07
Total valid votes		21,767	99.41	
Total rejected ballots		130	0.59	+0.08
Turnout		21,897	78.14	+2.79
Eligible voters		28,024		
Co-operative Commonwealth hold		Swing		–10.65
Source: Library of Parliament

1957 Canadian federal election
Party	Candidate	Votes	%	±%
Co-operative Commonwealth	Herbert Wilfred Herridge	8,996	43.79	–5.49
Social Credit	Donald Leslie Brothers	5,366	26.12	+4.90
Progressive Conservative	Charles H. Wright	3,475	16.92	+11.22
Liberal	William J. McLoughlin	2,705	13.17	–8.73
Total valid votes		20,542	99.48	
Total rejected ballots		107	0.52	–0.80
Turnout		20,649	75.34	+6.78
Eligible voters		27,406		
Co-operative Commonwealth hold		Swing		–5.20
Source: Library of Parliament

1953 Canadian federal election
Party	Candidate	Votes	%	±%
Co-operative Commonwealth	Herbert Wilfred Herridge	8,990	49.28	–4.79
Liberal	Ian Somerville	3,994	21.89	–
Social Credit	John Orville Bates	3,871	21.22	–
Progressive Conservative	Thomas Alexander McRae	1,040	5.70	–40.23
Labor–Progressive	Matilda Hall Belanger	347	1.90	–
Total valid votes		18,242	98.69	
Total rejected ballots		243	1.31	+0.57
Turnout		18,485	68.56	–6.19
Eligible voters		26,960		
Co-operative Commonwealth hold		Swing		–13.34
Source: Library of Parliament

1949 Canadian federal election
Party	Candidate	Votes	%	±%
Co-operative Commonwealth	Herbert Wilfred Herridge	9,794	54.07	+7.12
Progressive Conservative	John Robertson Corner	8,319	45.93	+15.95
Total valid votes		18,113	99.25	
Total rejected ballots		136	0.75	–0.18
Turnout		18,249	74.75	–10.26
Eligible voters		24,412		
Co-operative Commonwealth hold		Swing		–4.42
Source: Library of Parliament

1945 Canadian federal election
Party	Candidate	Votes	%	±%
Independent Co-operative Commonwealth Federation	Herbert Wilfred Herridge	6,123	37.17	+0.23
Progressive Conservative	Stuart Stanley McDiarmid	4,938	29.97	–9.17
Liberal	James Draper	3,802	23.08	–0.84
Co-operative Commonwealth	Frank F. Tracy	1,611	9.78	–27.16
Total valid votes		16,474	99.07	
Total rejected ballots		154	0.93	+0.20
Turnout		16,628	85.02	+3.07
Eligible voters		19,558		
Independent Co-operative Commonwealth gain from National Government		Swing		–
Source: Library of Parliament

1940 Canadian federal election
Party	Candidate	Votes	%	±%
National Government	William Esling	6,771	39.15	–3.07
Co-operative Commonwealth	Herbert Wilfred Herridge	6,389	36.94	+5.76
Liberal	Donald MacDonald	4,137	23.92	–2.69
Total valid votes		17,297	99.28	
Total rejected ballots		126	0.72	–0.03
Turnout		17,423	81.95	+5.06
Eligible voters		21,261		
National Government hold		Swing		–4.42
Source: Library of Parliament

1935 Canadian federal election
Party	Candidate	Votes	%	±%
Conservative	William Esling	4,995	42.21	–12.52
Co-operative Commonwealth	Herbert Wilfred Herridge	3,689	31.18	–
Liberal	Duncan Daniel McLean	3,149	26.61	–15.60
Total valid votes		11,833	99.25	
Total rejected ballots		90	0.75	+0.75
Turnout		11,923	76.89	–1.64
Eligible voters		15,507		
Conservative hold		Swing		–21.85
Source: Library of Parliament

1930 Canadian federal election
Party	Candidate	Votes	%	±%
Conservative	William Esling	7,699	54.73	+0.43
Liberal	Duncan Daniel McLean	5,938	42.22	–3.48
Frac Lib	Alfred Edward Watts	429	3.05	–
Total valid votes		14,066	100.00	
Total rejected ballots		–		
Turnout		14,066	78.53	+2.21
Eligible voters		17,911		
Conservative hold		Swing		+1.96
Source: Library of Parliament

1926 Canadian federal election
Party	Candidate	Votes	%	±%
Conservative	William Esling	6,247	54.30	–0.18
Liberal	Robert Henry Otley Gale	5,257	45.70	–
Total valid votes		11,504	100.00	
Total rejected ballots		–		
Turnout		11,504	76.33	–1.44
Eligible voters		15,072		
Conservative hold		Swing		–
Source: Library of Parliament

1925 Canadian federal election
Party	Candidate	Votes	%	±%
Conservative	William Esling	5,720	54.48	+14.78
Progressive	Levi William Humphrey	4,779	45.52	–3.37
Total valid votes		10,499	100.00	
Total rejected ballots		–		
Turnout		10,499	77.76	+1.67
Eligible voters		13,501		
Conservative gain from Progressive		Swing		–
Source: Library of Parliament

1921 Canadian federal election
Party	Candidate	Votes	%	±%
Progressive	Levi William Humphrey	4,790	48.89	–
Conservative	William Oliver Rose	3,890	39.71	–
Liberal	Roy Baird Staples	1,117	11.40	–
Total valid votes		9,797	100.00	
Total rejected ballots		–		
Turnout		9,797	76.10	–24.02
Eligible voters		12,874		
Progressive gain from Government (Unionist)		Swing		–
Source: Library of Parliament

1917 Canadian federal election
Party	Candidate	Votes	%	±%
Government (Unionist)	Robert Francis Green	5,377	63.18	–
Opposition (Laurier Liberals)	Winfield Maxwell	1,735	20.39	–
Labour	Irwin Amory Austin	1,399	16.44	–
Total valid votes		8,511	100.00	
Total rejected ballots		–		
Turnout		8,511	100.12	–
Eligible voters		8,501		
This riding was created from parts of Kootenay, where Conservative Robert Francis Green was the incumbent.
Source: Library of Parliament

== See also ==
- List of Canadian electoral districts
- Historical federal electoral districts of Canada
