= Alexander Douglas Turnbull =

Canadian politician

Alexander Turnbull

Member of the Legislative Assembly of British Columbia
- In office 1949–1952
- Preceded by: James O'Donnell Quinn
- Succeeded by: Robert Sommers
- Constituency: Rossland-Trail

Personal details
- Born: August 26, 1903 St. Marys, Ontario
- Died: June 23, 1993 (aged 89) Victoria, British Columbia
- Party: Liberal
- Spouse: Elsie G. Willard
- Occupation: Engineer

Alexander Douglas Turnbull (August 26, 1903 – June 23, 1993) was an engineer and political figure in British Columbia. After running unsuccessfully in a 1948 provincial byelection, he represented Rossland-Trail from 1949 until his defeat in the 1952 provincial election as a Liberal.

Born in St. Marys, Ontario in 1903, he was the son of J.W. Turnbull and Elizabeth Moore. Turnbull was educated at the University of Toronto as a metallurgical engineer. In 1928, he married Elsie G. Willard. Turnbull served as reeve of Tadanac from 1944 to 1945. He was a member of a Liberal-Conservative coalition in the assembly. Turnbull was defeated by Robert Edward Sommers when he ran for reelection in 1952. He served in the provincial cabinet as Minister of Health and Welfare, as Minister of Trade and Industry and as Minister of Municipal Affairs. He died in 1993.
