= Christopher D'Arcy =

Canadian politician (born 1940)

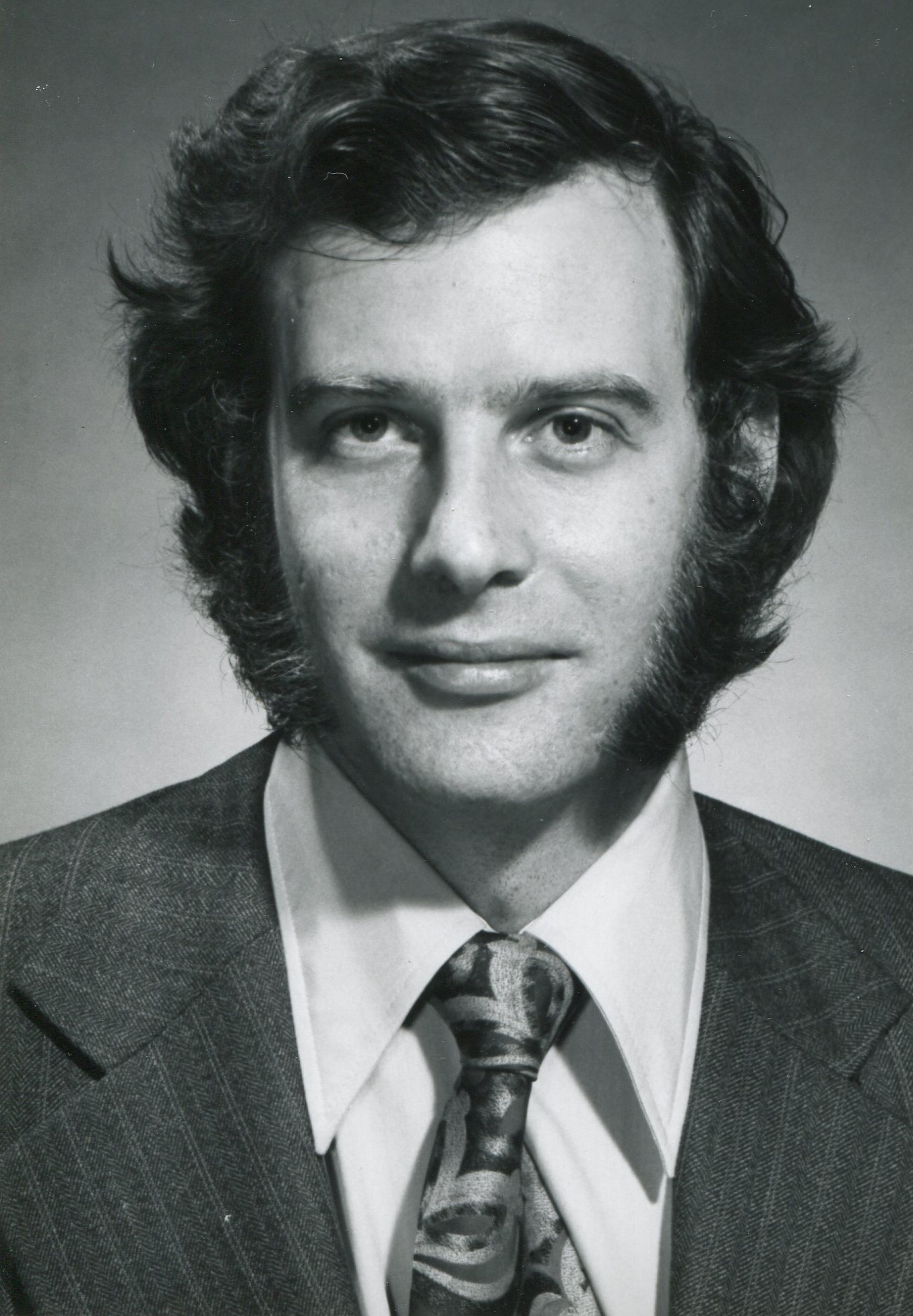

Christopher Anthony Conyers "Chris" D'Arcy (born December 22, 1940) was a publisher and political figure in British Columbia. He represented Rossland-Trail in the Legislative Assembly of British Columbia from 1972 to 1991 as a New Democratic Party (NDP) member.

He was born in Victoria, British Columbia, the son of Geoffrey Conyers D'Arcy and Grace Agnes Ryall, and was educated in Castlegar. D'Arcy was defeated when he ran for reelection to the provincial assembly as an independent in 1991.
