= Rossland-Trail =

Defunct provincial electoral district in British Columbia, Canada

Rossland-Trail was the name of a provincial electoral district in the Canadian province of British Columbia centred on the towns of Rossland and Trail, in the West Kootenay. The riding first appeared in the 1924 election as the result of a redistribution of the former ridings of Rossland and Trail, and lasted until redistribution in 1996. The same area is now part of West Kootenay-Boundary.

== Electoral history ==
Note: Winners in each election are in bold.

16th British Columbia election, 1924
Party	Candidate	Votes	%	±	Expenditures
Provincial	George Alexander Dingwall	436	22.72%	–	unknown
Liberal	John Hugh MacDonald	545	28.40%		unknown
Conservative	**James Hargrave Schofield**	**938**	**48.88%**		unknown
Total valid votes		1,919	100.00%		
Total rejected ballots					
Turnout		%			

17th British Columbia election, 1928
Party	Candidate	Votes	%	±	Expenditures
Conservative	**James Hargrave Schofield**	**1,686**	**58.12%**		unknown
Liberal	Donald MacDonald	1,215	41.88%		unknown
Total valid votes		2,901	100.00%		
Total rejected ballots		27			
Turnout		%			

18th British Columbia election, 1933 ^{15}
Party	Candidate	Votes	%	±	Expenditures
**Liberal**	**Richard Ronald Burns**	**1,729**	**43.84%**		unknown
Non-Partisan Independent Group	Arthur Garfield Cameron	1,314	33.32%	–	unknown
Co-operative Commonwealth Fed.t	George William Weaver	901	22.84%		unknown
Total valid votes		3,944	100.00%		
Total rejected ballots		38			
Turnout		%			

19th British Columbia election, 1937
Party	Candidate	Votes	%	±	Expenditures
**Liberal**	**Richard Ronald Burns**	**1,877**	**46.70%**		unknown
Conservative	Clarence Elliott Crowed	1,251	31.13%		unknown
Co-operative Commonwealth Fed.	Leo Thomas Nimsick	891	22.17%		unknown
Total valid votes		4,019	100.00%		
Total rejected ballots		72			
Turnout		%			

20th British Columbia election, 1941
Party	Candidate	Votes	%	±	Expenditures
Liberal	Richard Ronald Burns	1,789	24.41%		unknown
Conservative	Charles Frederick Daly	1,883	25.69 %		unknown
**Co-operative Commonwealth Fed.**	**Herbert Wilfred Herridge**	**3,621**	**49.40%**		unknown
Labour (Party)	Antonio Joseph (Pete) Vetere	37	0.50%		unknown
Total valid votes		7,330	100.00%		
Total rejected ballots		54			
Turnout		%			

31st British Columbia election, 1945
Party	Candidate	Votes	%	±	Expenditures
People's Co-operative Commonwealth Fed.	William Cunningham	2,060	32.06%		unknown
Co-operative Commonwealth Fed.	Rupert William Haggen	933	14.52%		unknown
Social Credit Alliance	Horton George Layton	261	4.06%		unknown
Coalition	**James Lockhart Webster**	**3,171**	**49.35%**	–	unknown
Total valid votes		6,425	100.00%		
Total rejected ballots		24			
Turnout		%			

22nd British Columbia election, 1949
Party	Candidate	Votes	%	±	Expenditures
Co-operative Commonwealth Fed.	James O'Donnell Quinn	4,588	43.70%		unknown
Coalition	**Alexander Douglas Turnbull**	**5,910**	**56.30%**	–	unknown
Total valid votes		10,498	100.00%		
Total rejected ballots		79			
Turnout		%			

23rd British Columbia election, 1952 ^{2}
Party	Candidate	Votes 1st count	%	Votes final count	%	±%	
Co-operative Commonwealth Fed.	Erling Olaf Johnson	2,541	22.02%	-	-.- %		unknown
**B.C. Social Credit League**	**Robert Edward Sommers**	**3,979**	**34.48%**	**5,917**	**55.20%**		unknown
Liberal	Alexander Douglas Turnbull	3,331	28.86%	4,803	44.80%		unknown
Conservative	Charles Alfred Holstead White	1,690	14.64%	-	-.- %		unknown
Total valid votes		11,541	100.00%	10,720	%		
Total rejected ballots		277					
Turnout		%					
^{2} Preferential ballot. First and final counts of three shown only.

24th British Columbia election, 1953 ^{3}
Party	Candidate	Votes 1st count	%	Votes final count	%	±%	
Conservative	Emil George Fletcher	621	5.56%	-	-.- %		unknown
Co-operative Commonwealth Fed.	Samuel Clayton Muirhead	3,470	31.06%	4,549	44.05%		unknown
Social Credit	**Robert Edward Sommers**	**4,182**	**37.43%**	**5,778**	**55.95%**		
Liberal	Douglas T. Wetmore	2,899	25.95%	-	-.- %		unknown
Total valid votes		11,172	100.00%	10,327	%		
Total rejected ballots		614					
Turnout		%					
^{3} Preferential ballot. First and final counts of three shown only.

25th British Columbia election, 1956
Party	Candidate	Votes	%	±	Expenditures
Conservative	Thomas Alexander McRae	252	2.48%		unknown
Co-operative Commonwealth Fed.	Samuel Clayton Muirhead	2,839	27.98%		unknown
Social Credit	**Robert Edward Sommers**	**5,097**	**50.23%**	–	unknown
Liberal	William Thompson Waldie	1,960	19.31%		unknown
Total valid votes		10,148	100.00%		
Total rejected ballots		70			
Turnout		%			

26th British Columbia election, 1960
Party	Candidate	Votes	%	±	Expenditures
Social Credit	**Donald Leslie Brothers**	5,562	51.12%	–	unknown
Co-operative Commonwealth Fed.	Kenneth William Gaylor	2,536	23.31%		unknown
Liberal	Michael Eugene Krause	2,034	18.69%		unknown
Progressive Conservative	John Wilberforce Loader	608	5.59%		unknown
Communist	Albert James Warrington	141	1.30%		unknown
Total valid votes		10,881	100.00%		
Total rejected ballots		81			
Turnout		%			

27th British Columbia election, 1963
Party	Candidate	Votes	%	±	Expenditures
Social Credit	**Donald Leslie Brothers**	**5,474**	**51.02%**	–	unknown
New Democratic	Robert Charles Maddocks	2,646	24.66%		unknown
Progressive Conservative	Alan J.G. McCulloch	1,470	13.70%		unknown
Liberal	John Basil Varcoe	1,139	10.62%		unknown
Total valid votes		10,729	100.00%		
Total rejected ballots		53			
Turnout		%			

28th British Columbia election, 1966
Party	Candidate	Votes	%	±	Expenditures
Social Credit	**Donald Leslie Brothers**	**5,600**	**55.93%**	–	unknown
New Democratic	Edward B. Campbell	2,453	24.50%		unknown
Liberal	Charles Samuel Fowler	1,960	19.57%		unknown
Total valid votes		10,013	100.00%		
Total rejected ballots		49			
Turnout		%			

29th British Columbia election, 1969
Party	Candidate	Votes	%	±	Expenditures
Social Credit	**Donald Leslie Brothers**	**6,230**	**48.54%**	–	unknown
New Democratic	Thomas Greer MacKenzie	4,948	38.55%		unknown
Liberal	Joseph Remesz	1,359	10.59%		unknown
Independent	Dell Campbell Valair	298	2.32%		unknown
Total valid votes		12,835	100.00%		
Total rejected ballots		127			
Turnout		%			

30th British Columbia election, 1972
Party	Candidate	Votes	%	±	Expenditures
Social Credit	Donald Leslie Brothers	4,936	35.21%	–	unknown
New Democratic	**Christopher D'Arcy**	**7,542**	**53.80%**		unknown
Liberal	Colin Thomas Maddocks	1,541	10.99%		unknown
Total valid votes		14,019	100.00%		
Total rejected ballots		92			
Turnout		%			

31st British Columbia election, 1975
Party	Candidate	Votes	%	±	Expenditures
Social Credit	Burton Peter Campbell	6,055	41.89%	–	unknown
New Democratic	**Christopher D'Arcy**	**7,881**	**54.52%**		unknown
Liberal	Thomas George Milne	519	3.59%		unknown
Total valid votes		14,455	100.00%		
Total rejected ballots		109			
Turnout		%			

32nd British Columbia election, 1979
Party	Candidate	Votes	%	±	Expenditures
Social Credit	Joseph Phillips Brooks	5,728	36.18%	–	unknown
New Democratic	**Christopher D'Arcy**	**9,252**	**58.44%**		unknown
Progressive Conservative	Dale Murray Brown	852	5.38%		unknown
Total valid votes		15,832	100.00%		
Total rejected ballots		186			
Turnout		%			

33rd British Columbia election, 1983
Party	Candidate	Votes	%	±	Expenditures
Liberal	Sergio C. Cocchia	394	2.34%		unknown
New Democratic	**Christopher D'Arcy**	**9,661**	**57.47%**		unknown
Independent	Frederick William James Peitasche	176	1.05%		unknown
Social Credit	Walter A. Siemens	6,581	39.14%	–	unknown
Total valid votes		16,812	100.00%		
Total rejected ballots		243			
Turnout		%			

34th British Columbia election, 1986
Party	Candidate	Votes	%	±	Expenditures
New Democratic	**Christopher D'Arcy**	**8,195**	**50.84%**		unknown
Liberal	Thomas C. Esakin	476	2.95%		unknown
Social Credit	Audrey L. Moore	7,448	46.21%	–	unknown
Total valid votes		16,119	100.00%		
Total rejected ballots		179			
Turnout		%			

35th British Columbia election, 1991
Party	Candidate	Votes	%	±	Expenditures
Social Credit	Walter A. Siemens	3,267	20.27%	–	unknown
New Democratic	**Ed Conroy**	**8,340**	**51.73%**		unknown
Green	Angela M.E. Price	713	4.42%	–	unknown
Independent	Christopher D'Arcy	3,802	23.58%		unknown
Total valid votes		16,122	100.00%		
Total rejected ballots		337			
Turnout		75.18%			

36th British Columbia election, 1996
Party	Candidate	Votes	%	±	Expenditures
New Democratic	**Ed Conroy**	**8,635**	**50.74%**		unknown
Liberal	Jim Greene	5,923	34.80%		unknown
Green	Clare Greidanus	434	2.55%	–	unknown
Reform	Phillip Morris	1,366	8.03%		unknown
Progressive Democratic Alliance	Kathy Plummer	660	3.88%		unknown
Total valid votes		17,018	100.00%		
Total rejected ballots		67			
Turnout		74.70%			

The Rossland-Trail area was redistributed following the 1996 election. The new riding representing the area at the 2001 election was West Kootenay-Boundary.

== See also ==
- List of British Columbia provincial electoral districts
- Canadian provincial electoral districts
- List of electoral districts in the Kootenays
