= GreenPAC =

- Founded: 2014
- Founder: Aaron Freeman
- Type: Non-profit
- Purpose: Environmentalism; Canadian politics
- Location: Toronto, Canada
- Region served: Canada
- Key people: Sabrina Bowman (Executive Director)
- Website: greenpac.ca

GreenPAC is a Canadian non-profit environmental organization, founded in 2014. Its goal is to help recruit, elect, and support environmental leadership in Canadian politics, across the political spectrum.

GreenPAC has run endorsement campaigns in the Canadian federal elections of 2015, 2019, and 2021, and provincial elections including those of Manitoba in 2016, British Columbia in 2017, and Ontario in 2018 and 2022.

== 2015 federal election campaign ==
GreenPAC's first campaign was during the 2015 Canadian federal election, in which they endorsed eighteen candidates for the House of Commons of Canada from four national parties who were deemed to have strong environmental track records by a panel of Canadian environmental experts. Only candidates considered to be in winnable situations were endorsed. GreenPAC encouraged Canadians to support these endorsed candidates' campaigns through donations or by volunteering.

The following 18 candidates were endorsed by GreenPAC in the 2015 federal election:

- William Amos, Liberal, Pontiac, QC: elected
- Richard Cannings, NDP, South Okanagan—West Kootenay, BC: elected
- Jim Carr, Liberal, Winnipeg South Centre, MB: elected
- Michael Chong, Conservative, Wellington—Halton Hills, ON: incumbent, re-elected
- François Choquette, NDP, Drummond, QC: incumbent, re-elected
- Nathan Cullen, NDP, Skeena—Bulkley Valley, BC: incumbent, re-elected
- Karine Desjardins, Liberal, Beloeil—Chambly, QC: not elected
- Fin Donnelly, NDP, Port Moody—Coquitlam, BC: incumbent (previously MP for New Westminster—Coquitlam), re-elected
- Kirsty Duncan, Liberal, Etobicoke North, ON: incumbent, re-elected
- Linda Duncan, NDP, Edmonton Strathcona, AB: incumbent, re-elected
- Terry Duguid, Liberal, Winnipeg South, MB: elected
- Bruce Hyer, Green, Thunder Bay—Superior North, ON: incumbent (previously NDP and independent), unseated
- Megan Leslie, NDP, Halifax, NS: incumbent, unseated
- Elizabeth May, Green, Saanich—Gulf Islands, BC: incumbent, re-elected
- Gord Miller, Green, Guelph, ON: not elected
- Joyce Murray, Liberal, Vancouver Quadra, BC: incumbent, re-elected
- Romeo Saganash, NDP, Abitibi—Baie-James—Nunavik—Eeyou, QC: incumbent, re-elected
- Dianne Watts, Conservative, South Surrey—White Rock, BC: elected

== 2016 Manitoba election campaign ==
Exactly six months after the 2015 federal election, the 2016 Manitoba provincial general election happened. Five candidates for the Legislative Assembly of Manitoba, representing four registered parties in the province, received endorsements from GreenPAC:

- James Allum, NDP, Fort Garry-Riverview: incumbent, re-elected
- Jon Gerrard, Liberal, River Heights: incumbent, re-elected
- Janine Gibson, Green, La Verendrye: not elected
- Eric Robinson, NDP, Keewatinook: incumbent, unseated
- Ian Wishart, PC, Portage la Prairie: incumbent, re-elected

== 2017 British Columbia election campaign ==
In the 2017 British Columbia provincial general election, GreenPAC endorsed six candidates for the Legislative Assembly of British Columbia, who represented three registered parties in the province:

- George Heyman, NDP, Vancouver-Fairview: incumbent, re-elected
- Jennifer Rice, NDP, North Coast: incumbent, re-elected
- Colleen Ross, NDP, Boundary-Similkameen: not elected
- Dallas Smith, Liberal, North Island: not elected
- Jordan Sturdy, Liberal, West Vancouver-Sea to Sky: incumbent, re-elected
- Andrew Weaver, Green, Oak Bay-Gordon Head: incumbent, re-elected

== 2018 Ontario election campaign ==
For the 2018 Ontario provincial general election, GreenPAC endorsed eight candidates for the Legislative Assembly of Ontario, who represented four registered parties in the province:

- Jessica Bell, NDP, University—Rosedale: elected
- Jim Bradley, Liberal, St. Catharines: incumbent, unseated
- Shelley Carroll, Liberal, Don Valley North: not elected
- Nathalie Des Rosiers, Liberal, Ottawa—Vanier: incumbent, re-elected
- Sylvia Jones, PC, Dufferin—Caledon: incumbent, re-elected
- Arthur Potts, Liberal, Beaches—East York: incumbent, unseated
- Mike Schreiner, Green, Guelph: elected
- Peter Tabuns, NDP, Toronto—Danforth: incumbent, re-elected

== 2019 federal election campaign ==
During the 2019 Canadian federal election, GreenPAC endorsed twenty-four House of Commons candidates from four national parties and one independent candidate who were deemed to have strong environmental track records by a panel of Canadian environmental experts. GreenPAC encouraged Canadians to support these endorsed candidates' campaigns through donations or by volunteering.

The following 25 candidates were endorsed by GreenPAC in the 2019 federal election:

- William Amos, Liberal, Pontiac, QC: incumbent, re-elected
- Taylor Bachrach, NDP, Skeena—Bulkley Valley, BC: elected
- Richard Cannings, NDP, South Okanagan—West Kootenay, BC: incumbent, re-elected
- Michael Chong, Conservative, Wellington—Halton Hills, ON: incumbent, re-elected
- François Choquette, NDP, Drummond, QC: incumbent, unseated
- Terry Duguid, Liberal, Winnipeg South, MB: incumbent, re-elected
- Kirsty Duncan, Liberal, Etobicoke North, ON: incumbent, re-elected
- Steve Dyck, Green, Guelph, ON: not elected
- Andy Fillmore, Liberal, Halifax, NS: incumbent, re-elected
- Joël Godin, Conservative, Portneuf—Jacques-Cartier, QC: incumbent, re-elected
- Steven Guilbeault, Liberal, Laurier—Sainte-Marie, QC: elected
- Gord Johns, NDP, Courtenay—Alberni, BC: incumbent, re-elected
- Anna Keenan, Green, Malpeque, PEI: not elected
- Racelle Kooy, Green, Victoria, BC: not elected
- Darcie Lanthier, Green, Charlottetown, PEI: not elected
- Larry Maguire, Conservative, Brandon—Souris, MB: incumbent, re-elected
- Elizabeth May, Green, Saanich—Gulf Islands, BC: incumbent, re-elected
- Dan Mazier, Conservative, Dauphin—Swan River—Neepawa, MB: elected
- Catherine McKenna, Liberal, Ottawa Centre, ON: incumbent, re-elected
- Gord Miller, Green, Parry Sound—Muskoka, ON: not elected
- Joyce Murray, Liberal, Vancouver Quadra, BC: incumbent, re-elected
- Joan Phillip, NDP, Central Okanagan—Similkameen—Nicola, BC: not elected
- Jane Philpott, Independent, Markham—Stouffville, ON: incumbent (previously Liberal), unseated
- Wayne Stetski, NDP, Kootenay—Columbia, BC: incumbent, unseated
- Rudy Turtle, NDP, Kenora, ON: not elected

== 2021 federal election campaign ==
During the 2021 Canadian federal election, GreenPAC endorsed thirty-six House of Commons candidates from five national parties who were deemed to have strong environmental track records by a panel of Canadian environmental experts.

- Marilou Alarie, BQ, Brome—Missisquoi, QC: not elected
- Dan Albas, Conservative, Central Okanagan—Similkameen—Nicola, BC: incumbent, re-elected
- Anjali Appadurai, NDP, Vancouver Granville, BC: not elected
- Taylor Bachrach, NDP, Skeena—Bulkley Valley, BC: incumbent, re-elected
- Terry Beech, Liberal, Burnaby North—Seymour, BC: incumbent, re-elected
- Richard Cannings, NDP, South Okanagan—West Kootenay, BC: incumbent, re-elected
- Michael Chong, Conservative, Wellington—Halton Hills, ON: incumbent, re-elected
- Julie Dabrusin, Liberal, Toronto—Danforth, ON: incumbent, re-elected
- Phil De Luna, Green, Toronto—St. Paul's, ON: not elected
- Tria Donaldson, NDP, Regina—Lewvan, SK: not elected
- Terry Duguid, Liberal, Winnipeg South, MB: incumbent, re-elected
- Kirsty Duncan, Liberal, Etobicoke North, ON: incumbent, re-elected
- Leah Gazan, NDP, Winnipeg Centre, MB: incumbent, re-elected
- Karina Gould, Liberal, Burlington, ON: incumbent, re-elected
- Matthew Green, NDP, Hamilton Centre, ON: incumbent, re-elected
- Steven Guilbeault, Liberal, Laurier—Sainte-Marie, QC: incumbent, re-elected
- Lori Idlout, NDP, Nunavut, NU: elected
- Gord Johns, NDP, Courtenay—Alberni, BC: incumbent, re-elected
- Peter Julian, NDP, New Westminster—Burnaby, BC: incumbent, re-elected
- Anna Keenan, Green, Malpeque, PEI: not elected
- Larry Maguire, Conservative, Brandon—Souris, MB: incumbent, re-elected
- Paul Manly, Green, Nanaimo—Ladysmith, BC: incumbent, unseated
- Elizabeth May, Green, Saanich—Gulf Islands, BC: incumbent, re-elected
- Dan Mazier, Conservative, Dauphin—Swan River—Neepawa, MB: incumbent, re-elected
- Susan McArthur, Conservative, Glengarry—Prescott—Russell, ON: not elected
- Jesse McCormick, Liberal, Kamloops—Thompson—Cariboo, BC: not elected
- Heather McPherson, NDP, Edmonton Strathcona, AB: incumbent, re-elected
- Mike Morrice, Green, Kitchener Centre, ON: elected
- Joyce Murray, Liberal, Vancouver Quadra, BC: incumbent, re-elected
- Mark Parent, Conservative, Kings—Hants, NS: not elected
- Monique Pauzé, BQ, Repentigny, QC: incumbent, re-elected
- Peter Schiefke, Liberal, Vaudreuil—Soulanges, QC: incumbent, re-elected
- Paul Taylor, NDP, Parkdale—High Park, ON: not elected
- Julie Vignola, BQ, Beauport—Limoilou, QC: incumbent, re-elected
- Jonathan Wilkinson, Liberal, North Vancouver, BC: incumbent, re-elected
- Lenore Zann, Liberal, Cumberland—Colchester, NS: incumbent, unseated

== 2022 Ontario election campaign ==
For the 2022 Ontario general election, GreenPAC endorsed thirteen Legislative Assembly of Ontario candidates across four registered political parties:

- Andria Barrett, NDP, Brampton South: not elected
- Jeff Burch, NDP, Niagara Centre: incumbent, re-elected
- Katie Gibbs, Liberal, Ottawa Centre: not elected
- Ted Hsu, Liberal, Kingston and the Islands: elected
- Bhutila Karpoche, NDP, Parkdale—High Park: incumbent, re-elected
- Jeff Lehman, Liberal, Barrie—Springwater—Oro-Medonte: not elected
- Erika Lougheed, NDP, Nipissing: not elected
- Sol Mamakwa, NDP, Kiiwetinoong: incumbent, re-elected
- Mary-Margaret McMahon, Liberal, Beaches—East York: elected
- Brian Saunderson, PC, Simcoe—Grey: elected
- Mike Schreiner, Green, Guelph: incumbent, re-elected
- Sandy Shaw, NDP, Hamilton West—Ancaster—Dundas: incumbent, re-elected
- Peter Tabuns, NDP, Toronto—Danforth: incumbent, re-elected
