= Jane Philpott =

Canadian physician, academic administrator

The Honourable Jane Philpott PC
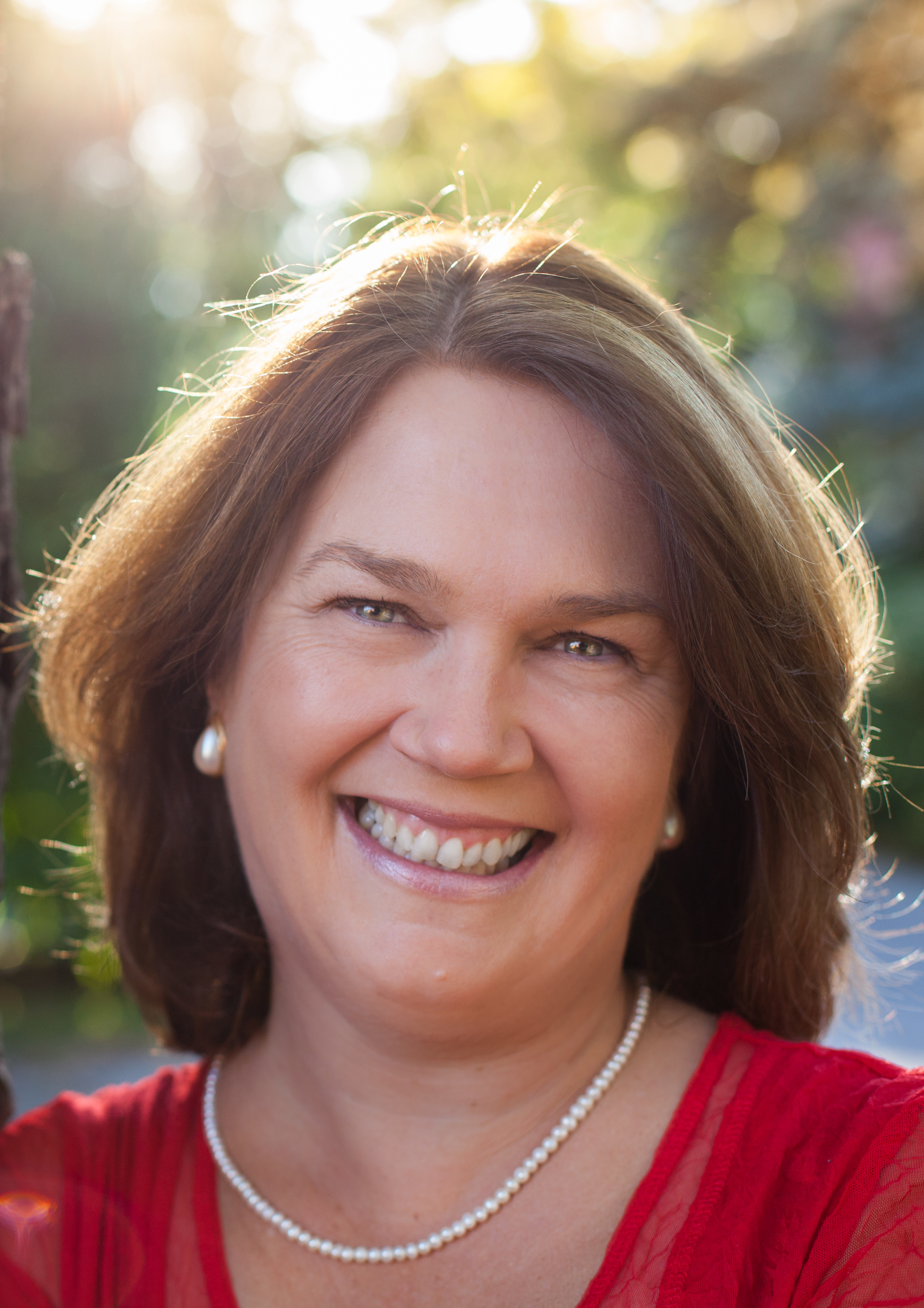

Dean of the Queen's University Faculty of Health Sciences
- In office July 1, 2020 – December 2024
- Preceded by: Richard Reznick
- Succeeded by: Stephen Vanner

President of the Treasury Board
- In office January 14 – March 4, 2019
- Prime Minister: Justin Trudeau
- Preceded by: Scott Brison
- Succeeded by: Carla Qualtrough (Acting); Joyce Murray

Minister of Indigenous Services
- In office August 28, 2017 – January 14, 2019
- Prime Minister: Justin Trudeau
- Preceded by: Position established
- Succeeded by: Seamus O'Regan

Minister of Health
- In office November 4, 2015 – August 28, 2017
- Prime Minister: Justin Trudeau
- Preceded by: Rona Ambrose
- Succeeded by: Ginette Petitpas Taylor

Member of Parliament for Markham—Stouffville
- In office October 19, 2015 – October 21, 2019
- Preceded by: Riding established
- Succeeded by: Helena Jaczek

Personal details
- Born: Jane Pauline Little; November 23, 1960 (age 65) Toronto, Ontario, Canada
- Party: Independent (2019), Liberal (2015–2019)
- Spouse: Paul Eric “Pep” Philpott (m. 1986)
- Children: 5
- Education: University of Western Ontario (BS, MD); University of Toronto (MPH)

Jane Pauline Philpott PC (née Little; born November 23, 1960) is a Canadian physician, academic administrator, and former politician who represented the riding of Markham—Stouffville in the House of Commons. She was first elected in the 2015 federal election as a member of the Liberal Party and was appointed to the Cabinet of the 29th Canadian Ministry, headed by Justin Trudeau, on November 4, 2015. On March 4, 2019, she resigned from her cabinet position as President of the Treasury Board over the SNC-Lavalin affair. On April 2, 2019, she and Jody Wilson-Raybould were expelled from the Liberal caucus in the aftermath of the controversy.

Philpott ran for reelection, as an independent candidate, in the 2019 federal election, but was defeated by Liberal candidate Helena Jaczek, placing third with 20.8% of the popular vote.

Prior to entering politics, Philpott was a family physician known for promoting medical education in Africa, HIV/AIDS fundraising, refugee advocacy, and her work on the social determinants of health.

In February 2020, she was appointed dean of the Queen's University Faculty of Health Sciences and director of the Queen's School of Medicine, and CEO of the Southeastern Ontario Academic Medical Organization (effective July 1, 2020). She resigned in December 2024 to take on a new role in the Ontario government.

== Early life and education ==
Jane Pauline Philpott was born Jane Pauline Little in Toronto, Ontario, and spent her childhood in Winnipeg, Manitoba and Princeton, New Jersey in the United States; and in Cambridge, Ontario. Her father, The Reverend Wallace Little, was a Presbyterian minister. Her mother, Audrey, was an elementary schoolteacher. She is the eldest of four daughters.

Philpott attended high school at Galt Collegiate Institute. She received a Bachelor of Science and medical training at University of Western Ontario, where she was granted a Doctorate of Medicine, graduating cum laude in 1984. She later earned a Master of Public Health, with a concentration in Global Health, in 2012 from the Dalla Lana School of Public Health at the University of Toronto. She also completed a Tropical Medicine Fellowship at Toronto General Hospital in Toronto, Ontario, in 1986–87. From 1984 to 1986 she completed a Family Medicine Residency at the University of Ottawa/Ottawa Civic Hospital in Ottawa, Ontario.

== Medical career ==
Philpott was a family doctor in Markham–Stouffville from 1998 to 2015. She was Chief of the Department of Family Medicine at Markham Stouffville Hospital from 2008 to 2014, and was concurrently Associate Professor in the University of Toronto's Department of Family and Community Medicine. She was the Lead Physician of the Health For All Family Health Team in Markham, Ontario.

She worked in Niger in West Africa from 1989 to 1998 with a faith-based non-governmental organization, where she practiced general medicine and developed a training program for village health workers. She returned to Niger in 2005 with Médecins sans Frontières during a food crisis.

She was the Family Medicine lead in the Toronto Addis Ababa Academic Collaboration (TAAAC) from 2008 to 2014. In this capacity she helped colleagues at Addis Ababa University to develop the first training program for Family Medicine in Ethiopia that began in 2013. The first seven students in this programme graduated in early 2016.

Philpott has advocated for Canada to give greater attention to the rights of refugees, particularly regarding healthcare. In an article in the Toronto Star in 2014, she argued that "the Conservative government's cuts to refugee health care are 'cruel and unusual'".

Philpott is a co-curator of TEDxStouffville, founded in 2012 with Dr. Eileen Nicolle. The TEDxStouffville committee, a collaboration between Health for All Family Health Team, Markham Stouffville Hospital, the University of Toronto and residents of the town of Whitchurch–Stouffville, develops programs with live speakers on Social Determinants of Health.

=== HIV/AIDS advocacy ===
Philpott co-founded "A Coin for Every Country", an educational campaign geared to intermediate level classrooms to raise funds for the Stephen Lewis Foundation in response to the HIV/AIDS pandemic. It was delivered through schools in the York Region District School Board.

In 2004, she founded the "Give a Day to World AIDS" movement, to engage Canadians in responding to HIV. It has grown in the medical, legal and business communities and, as of 2014, had raised over $75 million to help those affected by HIV in Africa.

Special advisory work

In April 2019, Philpott was appointed Special Advisor on Health for the Nishnawbe Aski Nation, an organization representing 49 First Nation communities of Treaty 5 and Treaty 9 in northern Ontario.

In June 2020, she was appointed the Ministers' Special Advisor for the Ontario Health Data platform.

=== Queen's University ===
Philpott was named the Dean of the Faculty of Health Sciences and Director of the School of Medicine for Queen's University in early 2020. She also is the CEO of the Southeastern Ontario Academic Medical Organization. Her five-year term in these positions started in July 2020.

Philpott has advocated the national decriminalization of the simple possession of illicit drugs to help cope with the increasing number of overdose deaths.

In September 2020, Philpott opened an Office of Equity, Diversity, and Inclusion in the Faculty of Health Sciences. She spearheaded the creation of the Dean's Action Table on Equity, Diversity, and Inclusion, which consists of an executive and seven working groups, and launched the Equity, Diversity, and Inclusion Fund.

In early December 2020, Philpott and two colleagues from the medical establishment in Kingston advocated a type of "no-fault insurance" scheme for manufacturers of COVID-19 vaccine, in order to indemnify them and shift the burden to the federal government.

Philpott initiated the creation of the Dean's Initiative for Indigenous Summer Programs and renewed focus on strengthening Queen's relationship with the Weeneebayko Area Health Authority (WAHA). Philpott also initiated the change to the QuARMS (Queen's Accelerated Route to Medical School) admissions policy, designating all 10 seats for Indigenous peoples and Black Canadians.

Philpott spearheaded the planning process for the launch of a new global health institute in the Faculty of Health Sciences.

== Federal politics ==
Philpott was acclaimed as the federal Liberal candidate in the new riding of Markham—Stouffville in April 2014. During the 2015 Canadian federal election campaign she was frequently called upon by the party to be a spokesperson on the subject on the CBC programme Power & Politics. She was critical of the Conservative government's lack of action and the returning of more than $350 million to the federal treasury in unspent funds over a three-year period, a sum that included millions for processing refugee applications and helping asylum-seekers settle into Canada. Following the death of Alan Kurdi she joined Marc Garneau in calling for increased refugee settlement in Canada by the end of 2015.

Philpott defeated the incumbent (from the redistributed riding of Oak Ridges—Markham), Paul Calandra. When asked by Campbell Clark of The Globe and Mail why she would move from medicine to politics she quoted Rudolf Virchow, the noted German physician who had a less successful political career, to explain why she sees economics and environment as key to human health, and chose to run for office: "Politics is nothing but medicine writ large."

=== Minister of Health ===
Philpott was appointed Minister of Health in the Cabinet of the 29th Canadian Ministry, headed by Justin Trudeau, on November 4, 2015. She is the first medical doctor to hold the post. Philpott was also appointed to the following Cabinet Committees on November 4, 2015.

- Treasury Board (Member)
- Cabinet Committee on Inclusive Growth, Opportunities and Innovation (Chair). This committee considers strategies designed to promote inclusive economic growth, opportunity, employment and social security, including sectoral strategies and initiatives.
- Cabinet Committee on Intelligence and Emergency Management (Member). This committee meets "as required to consider intelligence reports and priorities and to coordinate and manage responses to public emergencies and national security incidents". It regularly reviews the state of Canadian emergency readiness.

On November 9, 2015 she was appointed to chair a cabinet sub-committee to co-ordinate government efforts to resettle 25,000 Syrian refugees in Canada through government sponsorship by the end of 2015.

On May 1, 2016, after the new government had been in office for six months, David Akin, Parliamentary Bureau Chief of the Toronto Sun, published a rating of the Liberal Cabinet's work to date in which Philpott was awarded an A+. "A real-life doctor before politics, Philpott has been a quick master of a high-profile file and is flawlessly executing against her mandate letter from the PM. She's confident talking to Canadians about health policy issues. And she's handled controversial files such legalizing marijuana and dealing with mental health crises on First Nations with pitch-perfect tone. An easy standout in Trudeau's cabinet." Alise Mills, a Vancouver-based conservative political analyst, further commented "Gracious, composed and knows her files."

Issues addressed by Philpott in her first six months as Minister of Health include: Syrian refugees; Bill C-14 on Physician Assisted Dying; removal of cuts to refugee health plans made by the previous government; Safe Injection Sites; renegotiation of the Canada Health Accord with the provinces; establishment of a pan-Canadian Pharmaceutical Alliance; Indigenous health care issues, in particular mental health, including high rates of suicide, improving infrastructure for clean water on reserves, reforming child welfare to reduce the over-apprehension of Indigenous children, and violence in La Loche, Saskatchewan, and the Attawapiskat First Nation; the Zika virus outbreak; and the legalization of marijuana where she announced the government's plans at the United Nations on April 20, 2016.

On May 11, 2016, Philpott was appointed to the "Ad Hoc Committee on Northern Alberta Wildfires", a new ad hoc Cabinet committee to coordinate federal efforts to help the thousands of Canadians affected by the wildfires that raged through Northern Alberta in May 2016.

During the week of May 22–28, 2016, she chaired the annual Commonwealth Health Ministers meeting in Geneva, Switzerland and also led the Canadian delegation at the 69th World Health Assembly (WHA).

=== Minister of Indigenous Services ===
Philpott became the inaugural Minister of Indigenous Services in a cabinet shuffle on August 28, 2017; she was succeeded by Ginette Petitpas Taylor at the Ministry of Health.

=== President of the Treasury Board ===
On January 14, 2019, Prime Minister Justin Trudeau moved Philpott from her cabinet Indigenous Services portfolio to her new role as President of the Treasury Board.

On March 4, 2019, Philpott resigned from her position in the cabinet as President of the Treasury Board, citing her inability to reconcile with the government's handling of the SNC-Lavalin affair.

=== Independent MP ===
On April 2, 2019, Philpott was expelled from the Liberal parliamentary caucus. Though already nominated to run as a Liberal in the next federal election, Philpott subsequently announced that she would run as an independent candidate for Markham—Stouffville in the 2019 Canadian federal election.

On August 14, 2019, Mario Dion, the Parliament of Canada's Ethics Commissioner, released a report that said Trudeau contravened section 9 of the Conflict of Interest Act by improperly pressuring Attorney-General Jody Wilson-Raybould to drop a criminal case against SNC-Lavalin. The report details lobbying efforts by SNC-Lavalin to influence prosecution since at least February 2016, including its lobbying efforts against enacting deferred prosecution legislation. The report analyses SNC-Lavalin's interests and finds that the lobbying effort advanced private interests of the company, rather than public interests. The report's analysis section discusses the topics of prosecutorial independence and the Shawcross doctrine (dual role of Attorney General) to draw the conclusion that the influence was improper and a violation of Conflict of Interest Act thereby validating Philpott's decision to resign from cabinet over the affair. Philpott told the Canadian Press that the people of Canada still "deserve an apology" from Prime Minister Justin Trudeau on the SNC-Lavalin affair and issued a statement saying that she had taken a stand based on principle because she believes her constituents wanted her to uphold the highest ethical standard and that she welcomed the "validation" in the ethics commissioner's report. She also noted with regret that Dion was not granted "unfettered access to all information that could be relevant to the exercise" of his mandate, further stating that this is essential to ensure transparency and accountability for public office holders as it relates to conflicts of interest.

On September 3, 2019, Philpott was the only Independent candidate among the 25 candidates endorsed for the 2019 election by the GreenPAC environmental organization founded in 2014 with the goal to help recruit, elect, and support environmental leadership in Canadian politics. She ran for re-election in the 2019 federal election as an independent but lost.

== Post-parliamentary career ==
In February 2020, Philpott was appointed dean of the Queen's University Faculty of Health Sciences and director of the Queen's School of Medicine, and CEO of the Southeastern Ontario Academic Medical Organization (effective July 1, 2020).

In May 2020, during the COVID-19 pandemic in Canada, Philpott called for a national inquiry into long-term care facilities after a Canadian Armed Forces report on poor conditions in five Ontario homes that necessitated the deployment of military health personnel.

In spring 2024, Philpott released a book called Health for All: A Doctor's Prescription for a Healthier Canada.

In October 2024, Philpott was appointed by the Ontario provincial government of Doug Ford to take up a chair position in December of a task force on connecting Ontarians to primary-care doctors within five years.

== Personal life ==
In 1986, she married Paul Eric “Pep” Philpott, son of accountant Phyllis Crawley and Presbyterian minister Rev. James Philpott. They joined the Sudan Interior Mission and moved to Niger in 1989, where Philpott practiced medicine.

In March 1991, both of their young daughters contracted meningococcemia; Emily died, while Bethany recovered. Following this, the family returned to Canada, settling in Stouffville, Ontario, in 1998. After returning to Canada, Philpott worked as a family physician for 17 years. She was the chief of family medicine at Markham Stouffville Hospital from 2008 to 2014.

Philpott is involved as a song leader at the Community Mennonite Church, and Pep Philpott works as a CBC Radio journalist. Their surviving children are Bethany, Jacob, David, and Lydia. Bethany graduated from McMaster University with a medical degree in 2017. As of 2024, Philpott and her husband have two grandchildren.

== Awards and honours ==
- 2021 Medical Post Power List
- 2018 Chatelaine's Women of the Year
- 2016 Scotiabank Lectureship Award – the College of Family Physicians of Canada
- 2015 Member of the Queen's Privy Council for Canada – Government of Canada
- 2014 Integrated Medical Education Award for Excellence in Community-Based Teaching (Clinic/Office/Practice), Department of Family & Community Medicine, Faculty of Medicine, University of Toronto
- 2013 May Cohen Equity, Diversity, and Gender Award, Association of Faculties of Medicine of Canada
- 2013 Yves Talbot Award for Excellence in Global Health Leadership, University of Toronto, Department of Family and Community Medicine. (Distinction)
- 2012 Wilfred H. McKinnon Palmer Academic Award, University of Toronto. (Distinction)
- 2011 Community Service Award, University of Western Ontario, Schulich School of Medicine & Dentistry. (Distinction)
- 2010 Janus Scholarship for Global Health, College of Family Physicians of Canada
- 2009 Casey Award, Casey House, Toronto. (Distinction)
- 2009 Honorary Member, Federation of Medical Women of Canada. (Distinction)
- 2008 Stairway of Excellence Award, Galt Collegiate Institute, Cambridge, Ontario. (Distinction)
- 2007 Everyday Hero, Global National Television. (Distinction)

Ribbon	Description	Notes
	King Charles III Coronation Medal	Decoration awarded in 2025; Canadian version

== Electoral record ==
2019 Canadian federal election: Markham—Stouffville
Party	Candidate	Votes	%	±%	Expenditures
Liberal	Helena Jaczek	24,743	38.88	-10.33	$101,615.44
Conservative	Theodore Antony	19,570	30.74	-12.03	$80,408.76
Independent	Jane Philpott	13,216	20.76		$101,260.04
New Democratic	Hal Berman	4,013	6.30	+0.2	none listed
Green	Roy Long	1,581	2.48	+0.56	$5,982.06
People's	Jeremy Lin	531	0.83		$1,962.39
Total valid votes/expense limit		63,654	100.0		
Total rejected ballots					
Turnout					
Eligible voters					
Liberal hold		Swing		+0.85	
Sources: CBC News, Elections Canada

2015 Canadian federal election
Party	Candidate	Votes	%	±%	Expenditures
Liberal	Jane Philpott	29,416	49.21	+20.26	$112,011.35
Conservative	Paul Calandra	25,565	42.77	−7.72	$164,609.85
New Democratic	Gregory Hines	3,647	6.10	−10.88	$7,176.28
Green	Myles O'Brien	1,145	1.92	−0.81	$1,395.62
Total valid votes/Expense limit		59,773	100.00		$225,802.37
Total rejected ballots		189	0.32		
Turnout		59,962	68.56		
Eligible voters		87,460			
Liberal notional gain from Conservative		Swing		+13.99	
Source: Elections Canada
