= Markham—Stouffville =

Markham—Stouffville could refer to:

- Markham—Stouffville (federal electoral district)
- Markham—Stouffville (provincial electoral district)
