= Harry Botterell =

Canadian neurosurgeon (1906–1997)

- Born: Edmund Harry Botterell; 28 February 1906; Vancouver, British Columbia
- Died: 23 June 1997 (aged 91); Kingston, Ontario
- Occupations: neurosurgeon and academic administrator
- Awards: Order of Canada; Order of the British Empire

Edmund Harry Botterell, OC OBE (28 February 1906 – 23 June 1997) was a Canadian neurosurgeon and academic administrator.

From 1936 to 1939, he taught neurophysiology at the University of Toronto, and was an attending surgeon of Neurosurgery at the Toronto General Hospital, becoming Head from 1953 to 1962. From 1962 to 1970, he was the Dean of School of Medicine at Queen's University. He was Vice Principal of Faculty of Health Sciences from 1968 to 1971.

In 1978, he was made an Officer of the Order of Canada, Canada's highest civilian honor. Botterell was posthumously inducted into the Terry Fox Hall of Fame in 1998.

Botterell Hall at Queen's University was named in his honor.
