= Dan Ashton =

Canadian politician

His Worship Dan Ashton
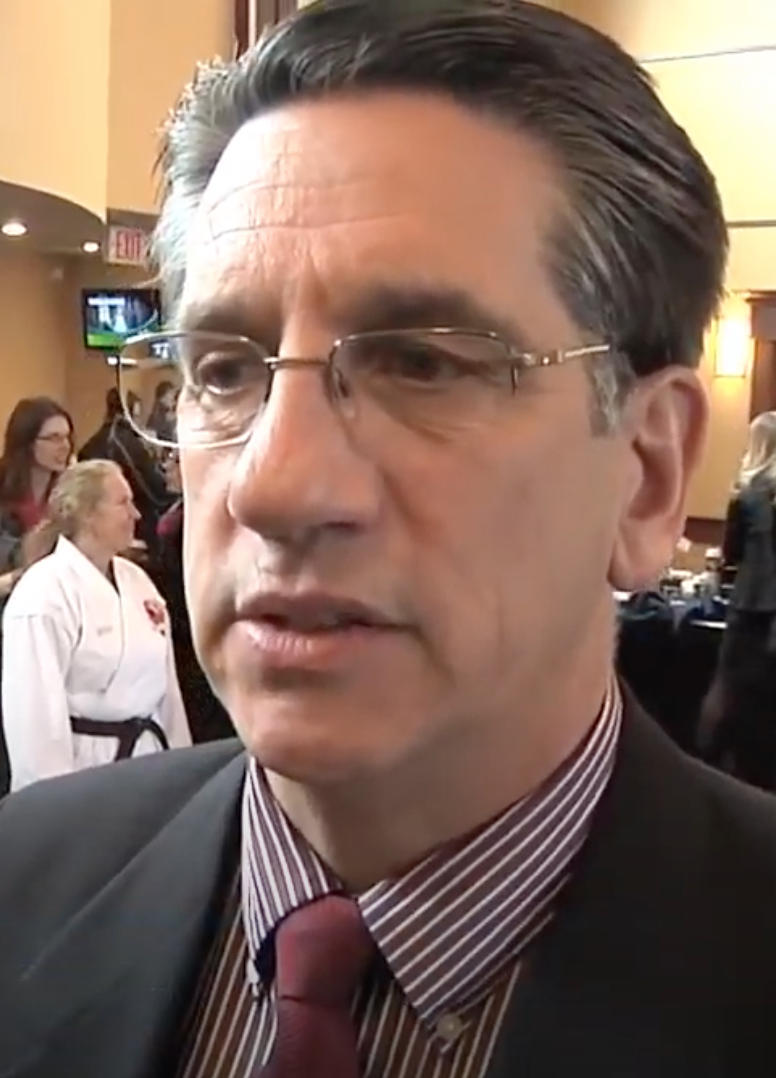

Member of the British Columbia Legislative Assembly for Penticton
- In office May 14, 2013 – September 21, 2024
- Preceded by: Bill Barisoff
- Succeeded by: Amelia Boultbee

Mayor of Penticton, British Columbia
- Incumbent
- Assumed office November 2, 2026
- Preceded by: Julius Bloomfield
- In office 2008–2013
- Preceded by: Jake Kimberley
- Succeeded by: Garry Litke

Personal details
- Born: 1954 or 1955 (age 71–72)
- Party: BC United (provincial) Conservative (federal)

Dan Ashton (born 1954 or 1955) is a Canadian politician, who was elected to the Legislative Assembly of British Columbia in the 2013 provincial election, and who was re-elected in 2017 and 2020. He represented the electoral district of Penticton as a member of BC United.

== Biography ==
Prior to his election to the legislature, Ashton served as mayor of Penticton from 2008 until 2013 and, prior to that, as city councillor from 1999 until 2008. During his time in the Legislature, he has in part served as Parliamentary Secretary to the Minister Responsible for Core Review, Parliamentary Secretary to the Minister of Finance, and Opposition critic for Municipal Affairs.

On December 20, 2023, Ashton announced that he would not be seeking re-election in 2024. On February 23, 2024, he announced that he would be seeking the nomination for the Conservative Party of Canada in the riding of Similkameen—South Okanagan—West Kootenay. In 2026, he was again elected mayor of Penticton.

== Electoral record ==
2020 British Columbia general election: Penticton
Party	Candidate	Votes	%	±%	Expenditures
Liberal	Dan Ashton	13,217	48.19	−5.36	$34,620.10
New Democratic	Toni Boot	10,343	37.71	+9.70	$11,650.73
Green	Ted Shumaker	3,152	11.49	−6.95	$19.00
Libertarian	Keith Macintyre	717	2.61	–	$605.44
Total valid votes		27,429	100.00	–	
Total rejected ballots					
Turnout					
Registered voters					
Source: Elections BC

2017 British Columbia general election: Penticton
Party	Candidate	Votes	%	±%	Expenditures
Liberal	Dan Ashton	14,470	52.80	+6.95	$48,359
New Democratic	Tarik Sayeed	7,874	28.73	−11.62	$50,324
Green	Connie Sahlmark	5,061	18.47	–	$4,596
Total valid votes		27,405	100.00		
Total rejected ballots		103	0.38		
Turnout		27,508	60.79		
Source: Elections BC

2013 British Columbia general election: Penticton
Party	Candidate	Votes	%	±%	Expenditures
Liberal	Dan Ashton	11,536	45.85	+1.86	$92,981
New Democratic	Richard Cannings	10,154	40.35	+9.20	$79,882
Conservative	Sean Upshaw	2,288	9.09	+0.35	$5,077
BC First	Doug Maxwell	1,185	4.71	–	$5,228
Total valid votes		25,163	100.00		
Total rejected ballots		173	0.68		
Turnout		25,336	58.27		
Source: Elections BC
