= Tracy St. Claire =

Canadian politician

Tracy St. Claire MLA

Member of the Legislative Assembly for Penticton-Summerland
- Incumbent
- Assumed office October 24, 2026
- Preceded by: Amelia Boultbee

Parliamentary Secretary for Rural Health
- Incumbent
- Assumed office November 20, 2026
- Preceded by: Debra Toporowski

Personal details
- Party: Conservative (provincial)
- Website: website

Tracy St. Claire MLA is a Canadian politician who was elected the member of the British Columbia Legislative Assembly for Penticton-Summerland at the 2026 British Columbia general election. She is a former school trustee and was the BC United candidate for the same riding in the 2024 election. Following the withdrawal of the party from that election to support the Conservative Party of British Columbia, St. Claire ran as an unaffiliated candidate in the riding and was not elected.

== Electoral record ==
2026 British Columbia general election: Penticton-Summerland
Party	Candidate	Votes	%	±%	Expenditures
Conservative	Tracy St. Claire	12,163	45.31	+3.94	
New Democratic	Tina Lee	11,112	41.40	+1.16	
Green	Bradley Sean Bartsch	2,155	8.03	+2.79	
OneBC	Warren Hamm	1,411	5.26	–	
Total valid votes		26,841	99.88	–	
Total rejected ballots		32	0.12	+0.02	
Turnout		26,873	57.18	–4.31	
Registered voters		47,001			
Conservative hold		Swing		+2.55	
Source: Elections BC
Incumbent MLA Amelia Boultbee was elected in 2024 as a Conservative, but resigned from the caucus on October 20, 2025, and crossed the floor to the New Democratic caucus on July 3, 2026. She did not run for re-election.

2024 British Columbia general election: Penticton-Summerland
Party	Candidate	Votes	%	±%	Expenditures
Conservative	Amelia Boultbee	11,615	41.37	–	$56,697.20
New Democratic	Tina Lee	11,298	40.24	+1.3	$30,293.77
Unaffiliated	Tracy St. Claire	2,720	9.69	–	$16,157.90
Green	Bradley Bartsch	1,472	5.24	-6.4	$2,072.42
Independent	Roger Harrington	827	2.95	–	$0.00
Independent	Anna Paddon	144	0.51	–	$617.10
Total valid votes/expense limit		28,076	99.90	–	$71,700.08
Total rejected ballots		29	0.10	–	
Turnout		28,105	61.49	–	
Registered voters		45,707			
Conservative notional gain from BC United		Swing		N/A (Note: Swing cannot be calculated as BC United did not run a candidate in this riding.)	
Source: Elections BC
