= Helena Jaczek =

Canadian politician and physician

The Honourable Helena Jaczek PC ECO MP

Minister of Public Services and Procurement Receiver General for Canada
- In office August 31, 2022 – July 26, 2023
- Prime Minister: Justin Trudeau
- Preceded by: Filomena Tassi
- Succeeded by: Jean-Yves Duclos

Minister responsible for the Federal Economic Development Agency for Southern Ontario
- In office October 26, 2021 – August 31, 2022
- Prime Minister: Justin Trudeau
- Preceded by: Mélanie Joly (Economic Development)
- Succeeded by: Filomena Tassi

Member of the Canadian Parliament for Markham—Stouffville
- Incumbent
- Assumed office October 21, 2019
- Preceded by: Jane Philpott

Chair of the Cabinet of Ontario
- In office January 17, 2018 – June 29, 2018
- Premier: Kathleen Wynne
- Preceded by: Deb Matthews
- Succeeded by: Vic Fedeli

Minister of Health and Long-Term Care
- In office February 26, 2018 – June 29, 2018
- Premier: Kathleen Wynne
- Preceded by: Eric Hoskins
- Succeeded by: Christine Elliott

Minister of Community and Social Services
- In office June 24, 2014 – February 26, 2018
- Premier: Kathleen Wynne
- Preceded by: Ted McMeekin
- Succeeded by: Michael Coteau

Member of the Ontario Provincial Parliament for Oak Ridges—Markham
- In office October 10, 2007 – June 7, 2018
- Preceded by: Constituency established
- Succeeded by: Constituency abolished

Personal details
- Born: Krystina Helena Jaczek London, England
- Party: Liberal
- Other political affiliations: Ontario Liberal
- Children: 2
- Education: St. Clement's School
- Alma mater: University of Toronto (MD, MHS); Schulich School of Business, York University (MBA)
- Occupation: Physician, politician
- Website: helenajaczek.liberal.ca

Krystina Helena Jaczek (/ˈdʒæzɛk/ JAZ-ek) is a Canadian physician and politician. A member of the Liberal Party, she currently represents the riding of Markham—Stouffville in the House of Commons and formerly served as the Minister of Public Services and Procurement and Receiver General for Canada. She currently serves as the chair for the Canada-Poland Parliamentary Friendship Group and the Parliamentary Health Research Caucus (PHRC).

In October 2021, Jaczek was appointed Minister responsible for the Federal Economic Development Agency for Southern Ontario (FedDev Ontario) in the Cabinet of Canada. Before entering federal politics in 2019, Jaczek served as a Member of the Legislative Assembly of Ontario from 2007 to 2018 representing Oak Ridges—Markham. She served as Minister of Community and Social Services from 2014 until 2018 and as Minister of Health and Long-Term Care in 2018, under the leadership of Kathleen Wynne.

== Background ==
Jaczek was born in England to a Polish father and an English mother, and emigrated to Canada in 1963 at age 12. She received her medical degree at the age of 22 and a Masters of Health Science from the University of Toronto, followed by a Masters of Business Administration from York University. After many years in general practice on staff at Women's College Hospital in Toronto, she then served as chief medical officer of health in York Region for 18 years. Through the years, she has sat on the boards of many community agencies.

At the time of the 2025 Canadian federal election, she lived in Markham, Ontario.

== Politics ==
=== Ontario provincial politics ===
In 2003, Jaczek ran as the Liberal candidate in the riding of Oak Ridges. Issues included tax rates and health care. She lost to incumbent Frank Klees by 2,521 votes. In 2007, Jaczek won the newly formed riding of Oak Ridges—Markham by 7,197 votes beating Conservative candidate Phil Bannon and New Democrat Janice Hagan. She was re-elected in the 2011, and 2014 elections. At the time, Oak Ridges-Markham was the most populous riding in the province until redistribution in 2018.

==== Parliamentary Assistant ====
Jaczek was appointed as a Parliamentary assistant (PA) to the Minister of Health Promotion on October 30, 2007. On September 11, 2009, she was made PA to the Minister of Environment. In February 2013, Jaczek was appointed as PA to the Minister of Health and Long-Term Care. From 2011 to 2014, she served as chair of the Liberal Caucus, under the premierships of both Dalton McGuinty and Kathleen Wynne. Jaczek was a member of several Standing Committees: Public Accounts, Social Policy, Government Agencies, Finance and Economic Affairs.

Jaczek was also a member of the Select Committee on Mental Health and Addictions. This special Committee held public hearings around the province, visiting mental health and addictions facilities and several First Nations communities to better understand the Mental Health and Addictions program challenges facing Ontario.

==== Private Member's Bills ====
Jaczek brought forward several Private Member's Bills. In 2009, she proposed a private member's bill, Bill 117, that would have prohibited riders under the age of 15 from riding motorcycles. In September 2010, she co-sponsored a private member's bill with PC and NDP MPPs to amend the Arthur Wishart Act (Franchise Disclosure) 2000, to better protect prospective franchisees. In March 2012, Jaczek introduced a private member's bill, Bill 40, to proclaim March 26 Epilepsy Awareness Day. She also introduced a private member's resolution to encourage organ donations. In February 2013, she introduced Bill 16, "An Act to amend the Municipal Act, 2001 to provide that the head of council of The Regional Municipality of York must be elected." On June 6, 2013, the bill received the support of all three parties, but it died on the order paper because of the 2014 Ontario General Election. However, in November 2016, the government introduced legislation that included a provision to ensure the direct election of chair and CEO of the Regional Municipality of York. This was subsequently overturned by the incoming PC government of Premier Doug Ford.

==== Cabinet appointment ====
On June 24, 2014, she was appointed by Premier Kathleen Wynne as the Minister of Community and Social Services and was the Vice Chair of Health, Education and Social Policy Cabinet Committee.

As a Cabinet Minister, Jaczek led the government's plan to reform social assistance, which includes overseeing Ontario's Basic Income Pilot as well as the establishment of the Income Security Reform Working Group who was tasked with developing ideas for a more holistic, client-centred approach to a broader income security. Jaczek has also overseen considerable reform in the developmental services sector, which includes the closing of all sheltered workshops in Ontario and has led the implementation of Ontario's Strategy to End Human Trafficking.

Jaczek was appointed Chair of Cabinet in addition to her role as Minister of Community and Social Services on January 17, 2018.

On February 26, 2018, she was appointed Minister of Health and Long-Term Care. During her time as Minister, the provincial government made an investment of $2.1 billion in mental health and addiction services. This was the largest provincial investment in mental health and addictions in Canadian history. The purpose of the funding was improving the quality of and access to community-based services, including the creation of 15 additional youth wellness hubs and more supportive housing.

In the 2018 general election, Jaczek ran for re-election in the new district of Markham—Stouffville which encompassed the eastern portion of her old riding, but was defeated by Progressive Conservative Paul Calandra.

=== Federal politics ===
In June 2019, there was speculation that Jaczek might enter federal politics and run as a Liberal Party of Canada candidate in Markham—Stouffville in the 2019 Canadian federal election, against the incumbent Independent MP Jane Philpott. In July 2019, Jaczek announced that she would be seeking the Liberal Party nomination in the riding.

During the 43rd Canadian Parliament, Jaczek introduced one private members bill, Bill C-303 An Act to establish a national strategy for health data collection, which sought to require the Minister of Health to develop a national strategy for the collection of health data, including the creation a national public health database for the purposes of research and policy development. though the Parliament ended before it was brought to a vote. In Budget 2022, the federal government committed to working with provinces and territories to ensure that Canada's healthcare system is underpinned by health data that will support health care system improvements and Canadians' access to their own personal data.

Jaczek served on the Standing Committee on Industry, Science and Technology (INDU) and the Standing Committee on Transport, Infrastructure and Communities (TRAN). During the COVID-19 pandemic, Jaczek was invited to take part in the Standing Committee on Health.

On September 20, 2021, Jaczek was re-elected as the Member of Parliament for Markham—Stouffville.

==== Contributions to Health Committee during COVID-19 ====
As part of the Standing Committee on Health, Jaczek used her expertise in medicine and public health to contribute to Canada's response to COVID-19, within the country and globally. She advocated for funding transparency, greater safety on airlines and better public health standards in the agricultural sector.

==== Cabinet appointment ====
On October 16, 2021, Jaczek was appointed as the Minister responsible for the Federal Economic Development Agency for Southern Ontario. Jaczek also serves as the vice-chair of the Treasury Board, Vice-chair of the Cabinet Committee on Reconciliation and a member of the Cabinet Committee on Operations, and the Cabinet Committee for Economy, Inclusion and Climate "A".

On August 31, 2022, Jaczek swapped portfolios with Filomena Tassi, becoming Minister of Public Services and Procurement and Receiver General for Canada while Tassi became Minister responsible for the Federal Economic Development Agency for Southern Ontario; the cabinet shuffle had been held at Tassi's request, having asked to be moved to a position with a lighter workload in order to deal with a family health matter.

On 25 July 2023, she announced she would not be running in the next election. In October 2024, she publicly called for a secret ballot on Trudeaus leadership of the Liberal Party. In the 2025 Liberal Party of Canada leadership election, she endorsed Mark Carney. On January 20, 2025, she announced her intention to run as a candidate in the 2025 Canadian federal election.

== Awards and honours ==
- 1996: Jaczek received the Distinguished Service Award from the Association of Local Public Health Agencies.
- 1997: Jaczek was a recipient of the Outstanding Alumni Mentor Award from the University of Toronto's Public Health Sciences Alumni Association.
- 2000: "In Celebration of Women" for medical leadership in York Region.
- In 2005, she received an award for environmental planning from the Canadian Institute of Planners.
- In 2016, she received the Ontario Psychological Association Public Service Award, as well as, the Ontario Medical Association, Life Membership Award.
- In April 2017, she was awarded the Helen Keller Award by the Canadian Foundation for Physically Disabled Persons and the Canadian Helen Keller Centre for the contributions she has made to hearing and visually impaired Ontarians.
- In November 2021, she received a Life Membership from The College of Family Physicians of Canada.

== Electoral record ==
=== Federal ===
2025 Canadian federal election: Markham—Stouffville
Party	Candidate	Votes	%	±%
Liberal	Helena Jaczek	31,658	51.36	–0.19
Conservative	Niran Jeyanesan	27,898	45.26	+10.50
New Democratic	Serena Cheung	1,121	1.82	–6.97
Green	Myles O'Brien	433	0.70	–1.27
People's	René de Vries	393	0.64	–2.30
Centrist	Shahzad Ahmed	141	0.23	N/A
Total valid votes		61,644	99.46	
Total rejected ballots		334	0.54	-0.29
Turnout		61,978	69.23	+9.84
Eligible voters		89,529		
Liberal notional hold		Swing		–5.35
Source: Elections Canada

2021 Canadian federal election: Markham—Stouffville
Party	Candidate	Votes	%	±%	Expenditures
Liberal	Helena Jaczek	29,773	50.99	+12.11	$102,548.63
Conservative	Ben Smith	20,740	35.52	+4.78	$105,317.55
New Democratic	Muhammad Ahsin Sahi	4,961	8.50	+2.19	$2,935.24
People's	René De Vries	1,869	3.20	+2.37	$4,030.60
Green	Uzair Baig	1,049	1.80	-0.69	$3,158.35
Total valid votes/expense limit		58,392	–	–	$124,038.54
Total rejected ballots		459			
Turnout		58,851	60.78	-7.78	
Eligible voters		96,829			
Liberal hold		Swing		+3.67	
Source: Elections Canada

2019 Canadian federal election: Markham—Stouffville
Party	Candidate	Votes	%	±%	Expenditures
Liberal	Helena Jaczek	24,743	38.88	-10.33	$101,615.44
Conservative	Theodore Antony	19,570	30.74	-12.03	$80,408.76
Independent	Jane Philpott	13,216	20.76		$101,260.04
New Democratic	Hal Berman	4,013	6.30	+0.2	none listed
Green	Roy Long	1,581	2.48	+0.56	$5,982.06
People's	Jeremy Lin	531	0.83		$1,962.39
Total valid votes/expense limit		63,654	100.0		
Total rejected ballots					
Turnout					
Eligible voters					
Liberal hold		Swing		+0.85	
Sources: CBC News, Elections Canada

=== Provincial ===
2018 Ontario general election: Markham—Stouffville
Party	Candidate	Votes	%	±%
Progressive Conservative	Paul Calandra	25,912	48.12	+14.03
Liberal	Helena Jaczek	14,007	26.01	–22.46
New Democratic	Kingsley Kwok	10,997	20.42	+8.30
Green	Jose Etcheverry	2,153	4.00	+0.34
Libertarian	Paul Balfour	660	1.23	–
Moderate	Yuri Duboisky	117	0.22	–
Total valid votes		53,846	98.97	
Total rejected, unmarked and declined ballots		559	1.03	
Turnout		54,405	58.85	
Eligible voters		92,442		
Progressive Conservative notional gain from Liberal		Swing		▲18.25
Source: Elections Ontario

2014 Ontario general election: Oak Ridges—Markham
Party	Candidate	Votes	%	±%	Expenditures
Liberal	Helena Jaczek	36,782	45.55	+0.77	$92,420.12
Progressive Conservative	Farid Wassef	30,256	37.47	+0.33	$173,298.00
New Democratic	Miles Krauter	9,355	11.58	–1.67	$4,568.86
Green	Emilia Melara	2,791	3.46	+1.02	$0
Libertarian	Karl Boelling	1,358	1.68	+0.04	$0
Trillium	Gennady Vilensky	213	0.26	–	$0
Total valid votes		80,755	98.59		
Total rejected, unmarked and declined ballots		1,156	1.41	+0.80	
Turnout		81,911	46.21	+3.51	
Eligible voters		177,255			
Liberal hold		Swing		+0.22	
Source: Elections Ontario

2011 Ontario general election: Oak Ridges—Markham
Party	Candidate	Votes	%	±%	Expenditures
Liberal	Helena Jaczek	28,878	44.78	–3.43	$83,066.00
Progressive Conservative	Farid Wassef	23,950	37.14	+1.07	$146,606.59
New Democratic	Joe Whitfeld	8,548	13.26	+5.33	$11,142.60
Green	Trifon Haitas	1,569	2.43	–4.01	$350.00
Libertarian	Karl Boelling	1,057	1.64	–	$213.07
Independent	Ruida Lu	484	0.75	–	$2,766.14
Total valid votes/expense limit		64,486	99.39	–	$180,834,78
Total rejected, unmarked and declined ballots		395	0.61	–0.14	
Turnout		64,881	42.70	–5.07	
Eligible voters		151,959			
Liberal hold		Swing		–2.25	
Source: Elections Ontario

2007 Ontario general election: Oak Ridges—Markham
Party	Candidate	Votes	%
Liberal	Helena Jaczek	28,564	48.22
Progressive Conservative	Phil Bannon	21,367	36.07
New Democratic	Janice Hagan	4,698	7.93
Green	Attila Nagy	3,815	6.44
Family Coalition	Patrick Redmond	455	0.77
Independent	Doug Ransom	342	0.58
Total valid votes		59,241	99.26
Total rejected, unmarked and declined ballots		444	0.74
Turnout		59,685	47.77
Eligible voters		124,939	
Liberal pickup new district.			
Source: Elections Ontario

2003 Ontario general election, Oak Ridges
Party	Candidate	Votes	%	±%
Progressive Conservative	Frank Klees	32,647	47.27	-12.72
Liberal	Helena Jaczek	30,126	43.62	+9.27
New Democratic	Pamela Courtot	4,464	6.46	+2.60
Green	Steven Haylestrom	1,821	2.64	+0.84

29th Canadian Ministry (2015–2025) – Cabinet of Justin Trudeau
Cabinet posts (2)
Predecessor	Office	Successor
Filomena Tassi	Minister of Public Services and Procurement; August 31, 2022 – July 26, 2023	Jean-Yves Duclos
Mélanie Joly	Minister responsible for the Federal Economic Development Agency for Southern Ontario; October 26, 2021 – August 31, 2022	Filomena Tassi

Wynne ministry, Province of Ontario (2013–2018)
Cabinet posts (2)
Predecessor	Office	Successor
Eric Hoskins	Minister of Health and Long-Term Care; 2018 (January–June)	Christine Elliott
Ted McMeekin	Minister of Community and Social Services; 2014–2018	Michael Coteau
