= Amelia Boultbee =

Canadian politician

Member of the Legislative Assembly of British Columbia for Penticton-Summerland
- In office October 19, 2024 – October 24, 2026
- Preceded by: Dan Ashton
- Succeeded by: Tracy St. Claire

Personal details
- Party: New Democratic (since 2026)
- Other political affiliations: BC Conservative (until 2025); Independent (2025–2026)

Amelia Boultbee is a Canadian politician who served as a member of the Legislative Assembly of British Columbia (MLA) for the electoral district of Penticton-Summerland from 2024 to 2026. Initially elected as a member of the Conservative Party, she left the party in 2025 where she sat as an independent until crossing the floor to the New Democratic Party in 2026. Prior to provincial politics, she served as a Penticton city councillor.

== Early life and career ==
Born and raised in Penticton, Boultbee is a fourth-generation Pentictonite. She has a Bachelor of Arts degree in Political Science from the University of British Columbia, and went on to earn a Juris Doctor degree from Peter A. Allard School of Law also at the University of British Columbia.

Boultbee has worked as a civil litigator in Downtown Vancouver specializing in personal injury law, real estate law, construction law, insurance law, and family law. She later transitioned to work for Veterans Affairs Canada, representing Canadian Armed Forces and Royal Canadian Mounted Police members on disability and pension issues.

== Political career ==
In 2022, Boultbee ran for Penticton City Council, winning a seat and receiving the most votes of any candidate.

On February 26, 2024, Boultbee was nominated as the Conservative Party of British Columbia's candidate for Penticton-Summerland in the 2024 provincial election. She went on to win a seat in the Legislative Assembly of BC, defeating BC NDP candidate Tina Lee by 317 votes. She is the first woman MLA to represent the riding and served in the Official Opposition's shadow cabinet as the critic for Children and Family Development. Her policy priorities included a new healthcare centre for Summerland, tackling the opioid crisis, and opposing the approved gravel pit in Summerland.

In March 2025, Boultbee advocated for accountability in the Ministry of Children and Family Development after Chantelle Williams, an 18-year-old Indigenous child under the care of the ministry, was found dead in Port Alberni outside of her group home on January 28, 2025. She has called for the release of a coroner's inquest. She has had public disagreements with MLA Dallas Brodie over LGBTQ rights.

On October 20, 2025, Boultbee resigned from the BC Conservative caucus to sit as an independent shortly after fellow party MLA Elenore Sturko was removed from caucus for opposing the leadership of John Rustad. She called on John Rustad to resign as leader of the BC Conservatives.

On July 3, 2026, Boultbee crossed the floor to join the governing BC NDP caucus after serving as an independent for more than eight months. She cited a shift toward "Trump-style populism" under new BC Conservative leader Kerry-Lynne Findlay as the reason she would not be returning to its caucus. David Eby said Boultbee had demonstrated a commitment to representing her constituents and welcomed her to the government caucus. Her floor crossing gave the party a working majority in the Legislative Assembly.

On September 28, 2026, she announced she was withdrawing as a candidate in the 2026 election, and would not seek re-election. In Penticton-Summerland, Tina Lee was again chosen as the NDP candidate and Tracy St Claire was chosen as the new Conservative candidate.

== Electoral history ==
2024 British Columbia general election: Penticton-Summerland
Party	Candidate	Votes	%	±%	Expenditures
Conservative	Amelia Boultbee	11,615	41.37	–	$56,697.20
New Democratic	Tina Lee	11,298	40.24	+1.3	$30,293.77
Unaffiliated	Tracy St. Claire	2,720	9.69	–	$16,157.90
Green	Bradley Bartsch	1,472	5.24	-6.4	$2,072.42
Independent	Roger Harrington	827	2.95	–	$0.00
Independent	Anna Paddon	144	0.51	–	$617.10
Total valid votes/expense limit		28,076	99.90	–	$71,700.08
Total rejected ballots		29	0.10	–	
Turnout		28,105	61.49	–	
Registered voters		45,707			
Conservative notional gain from BC United		Swing		N/A (Note: Swing cannot be calculated as BC United did not run a candidate in this riding.)	
Source: Elections BC

=== 2022 Penticton City Council election ===
The results for Penticton City Council were as follows:

Top 6 candidates elected

Council candidate	Vote	%
Amelia Boultbee †	5,618	55.54
James Miller (X) †	4,488	44.37
Ryan Graham †	4,366	43.16
Helena Konanz †	3,730	36.88
Campbell Watt (X) †	3,653	36.11
Isaac Gilbert †	3,309	32.71
Andrew Jakubeit	3,289	32.52
Frank Regehr (X)	3,020	29.86
Katie O&#39;Kell	2,928	28.95
Nick Kruger	2,921	28.88
Shannon Stewart	2,734	27.03
Wayne Llewellyn	2,452	24.24
Katie Robinson (X)	2,350	23.23
Lindsey Hall	2,013	19.90
Larry Schwartzenberger	1,699	16.80
Davinder Sandhu	1,390	13.74
Turnout	10,115	33.40
