= Markham—Stouffville (provincial electoral district) =

Provincial electoral district in Ontario, Canada

Coordinates: 43.977°N 79.273°W

Ontario electoral district
- Markham—Stouffville is in south-central Ontario, just north of Toronto

Provincial electoral district
- Legislature: Legislative Assembly of Ontario
MPP
Paul Calandra
Progressive Conservative
- District created: 2015
- First contested: 2018
- Last contested: 2025

Demographics
- Population (2021): 135,944
- Electors (2025): 103,662
- Area (km²): 287
- Pop. density (per km²): 473.7
- Census division: Regional Municipality of York
- Census subdivision(s): Markham, Whitchurch–Stouffville

Markham—Stouffville is a provincial electoral district in Ontario, Canada. It encompasses a portion of Ontario formerly included in the electoral districts of Markham—Unionville (provincial electoral district) and Oak Ridges—Markham (provincial electoral district).

The boundaries of the provincial riding of Markham—Stouffville are identical with those of the new federal riding of Markham—Stouffville, created by the 2012 Canadian federal electoral redistribution. The provincial redistribution came into effect upon the call of the 42nd Ontario provincial election in June 2018.

The territory of the new riding (map) consists of part of the Regional Municipality of York: (a) the town of Whitchurch–Stouffville; and (b) the part of the city of Markham lying easterly of a line described as follows: commencing at the intersection of the northerly limit of Markham with Highway 48; then southerly along Highway 48 to 16th Avenue; then westerly to McCowan Road; then southerly to Highway 407; then easterly along Highway 407 to the Rouge River; then generally southeasterly along Rouge River to the southerly limit of Markham. The riding's population was estimated at 109,780 at the time of the 2012 Canadian federal electoral redistribution.

== Demographics ==
According to the 2011 Canadian census; 2013 representation

Ethnic groups: 53.8% White, 16.4% Chinese, 15.3% South Asian, 3.8% Black, 3.7% Filipino
Languages: 63.7% English, 12.9% Chinese, 3.9% Tamil, 2.5% Italian, 1.8% Tagalog, 1.6% Urdu, 1.4% French, 1.1% Greek, 1.0% Gujarati
Religions: 60.9% Christian (27.9% Catholic, 6.2% Anglican, 5.5% United Church, 4.8% Christian Orthodox, 2.4% Baptist, 2.2% Presbyterian, 1.5% Pentecostal, 10.5% other), 8.0% Hindu, 4.9% Muslim, 1.8% Buddhist, 22.6% no religion
Median income (2010): $36,258
Average income (2010): $48,199

== Members of Provincial Parliament ==
Markham-Stouffville
Assembly	Years	Member	Party
Riding created from Markham—Unionville and Oak Ridges—Markham
42nd	2018–2022	Paul Calandra	Progressive Conservative
43rd	2022–2025	Paul Calandra	Progressive Conservative
44th	2025–present	Paul Calandra	Progressive Conservative

== Election results ==
Winning party in each polling division of Markham—Stouffville at the 2025 Ontario general election

2025 Ontario general election
Party	Candidate	Votes	%	±%
Progressive Conservative	Paul Calandra	22,757	50.64	+2.21
Liberal	Kelly Dunn	18,624	41.44	+5.96
New Democratic	Gregory Hines	2,051	4.56	–4.90
Green	Myles O'Brien	1,018	2.27	–1.68
New Blue	Brendan Sorenson	491	1.09	–0.41
Total valid votes		44,941	99.52	
Total rejected, unmarked and declined ballots		219	0.48	–0.04
Turnout		45,160	43.39	–1.12
Eligible voters		104,085		
Progressive Conservative hold		Swing		▼1.88
Source: Elections Ontario

Winning party in each polling division of Markham—Stouffville at the 2022 Ontario general election

2022 Ontario general election
Party	Candidate	Votes	%	±%
Progressive Conservative	Paul Calandra	21,176	48.43	+0.31
Liberal	Kelly Dunn	15,512	35.48	+9.46
New Democratic	Kingsley Kwok	4,137	9.46	–10.96
Green	Myles O'Brien	1,723	3.94	–0.06
New Blue	Jennifer Gowland	658	1.50	–
Ontario Party	Michele Petit	517	1.18	–
Total valid votes		43,723	99.48	
Total rejected, unmarked and declined ballots		229	0.52	–0.51
Turnout		43,952	44.51	–14.34
Eligible voters		98,749		
Progressive Conservative hold		Swing		▼4.58
Source: Elections Ontario

2018 Ontario general election
Party	Candidate	Votes	%
Progressive Conservative	Paul Calandra	25,912	48.12
Liberal	Helena Jaczek	14,007	26.01
New Democratic	Kingsley Kwok	10,997	20.42
Green	Jose Etcheverry	2,153	4.00
Libertarian	Paul Balfour	660	1.23
Moderate	Yuri Duboisky	117	0.22
Total valid votes		53,846	98.97
Total rejected, unmarked and declined ballots		559	1.03
Turnout		54,405	58.85
Eligible voters		92,442	
Progressive Conservative pickup new district.			
Source: Elections Ontario

2014 general election redistributed results
Party	Vote	%
Liberal	20,701	48.47
Progressive Conservative	14,559	34.09
New Democratic	5,176	12.12
Green	1,561	3.66
Others	712	1.67

== See also ==
- List of Ontario provincial electoral districts
- Canadian provincial electoral districts
