= Bill Barisoff =

Canadian politician

36th Speaker of the Legislative Assembly of British Columbia
- In office September 12, 2005 – June 25, 2013
- Preceded by: Claude Richmond
- Succeeded by: Linda Reid

Member of the British Columbia Legislative Assembly for Penticton Penticton-Okanagan Valley (2001-2009) Okanagan-Boundary (1996-2001)
- In office May 28, 1996 – May 14, 2013
- Preceded by: Bill Barlee
- Succeeded by: Dan Ashton

Minister of Provincial Revenue of British Columbia
- In office June 5, 2001 – January 26, 2004
- Premier: Gordon Campbell
- Preceded by: Position established
- Succeeded by: Rick Thorpe

Minister of Water, Land and Air Protection of British Columbia
- In office January 26, 2004 – June 16, 2005
- Premier: Gordon Campbell
- Preceded by: Joyce Murray
- Succeeded by: Barry Penner (Minister of Environment)

Personal details
- Born: 1948 or 1949 (age 77–78) Oliver, British Columbia
- Party: BC Liberal
- Spouse: Edna Barisoff

Bill Barisoff is a Canadian politician who served as a member of the Legislative Assembly (MLA) of British Columbia from 1996 to 2013, representing the districts of Okanagan-Boundary, Penticton-Okanagan Valley and Penticton over the course of his career. A caucus member of the British Columbia Liberal Party, he served in the cabinet of Premier Gordon Campbell as Minister of Provincial Revenue and Minister of Water, Land and Air Protection. He was also the 36th Speaker of the Legislative Assembly of British Columbia from 2005 to 2013.

== Biography ==
Born in Oliver, British Columbia, Barisoff owned a trucking company and served as a volunteer firefighter before entering politics. He was also a trustee with School District 53 for 18 years, including eight years as the district's chair.

He was approached by BC Liberal leader Gordon Campbell to contest the 1996 provincial election for that party, and was elected MLA in Okanagan-Boundary by narrowly defeating the incumbent Bill Barlee. While the Liberals were the Official Opposition, he served as critic for agriculture, transportation and highways, and aboriginal affairs.

With the Okanagan-Boundary riding dissolved ahead of the 2001 election, he ran in Penticton-Okanagan Valley and was re-elected there. The Liberals gained power in that election, and Barisoff was appointed to the cabinet that June to serve as Minister of Provincial Revenue; he was re-assigned as Minister of Water, Land and Air Protection in January 2004.

He was re-elected MLA in 2005, and was chosen as Speaker of the Legislative Assembly that September. In 2009 he won re-election in the renamed riding of Penticton, and continued as speaker. He faced criticism in 2012 following a report from the province's auditor general stating that basic accounting practices were not followed in the legislature, such as asking for receipts when approving MLA expenses; Barisoff was responsible for overseeing the legislature's budget ($63 million as of 2012) in his capacity as speaker. He announced in August 2012 that he would not run in the next election.

He and his wife Edna have three sons together.
