= Oak Ridges—Markham (provincial electoral district) =

Former provincial electoral district in Ontario

Ontario electoral district
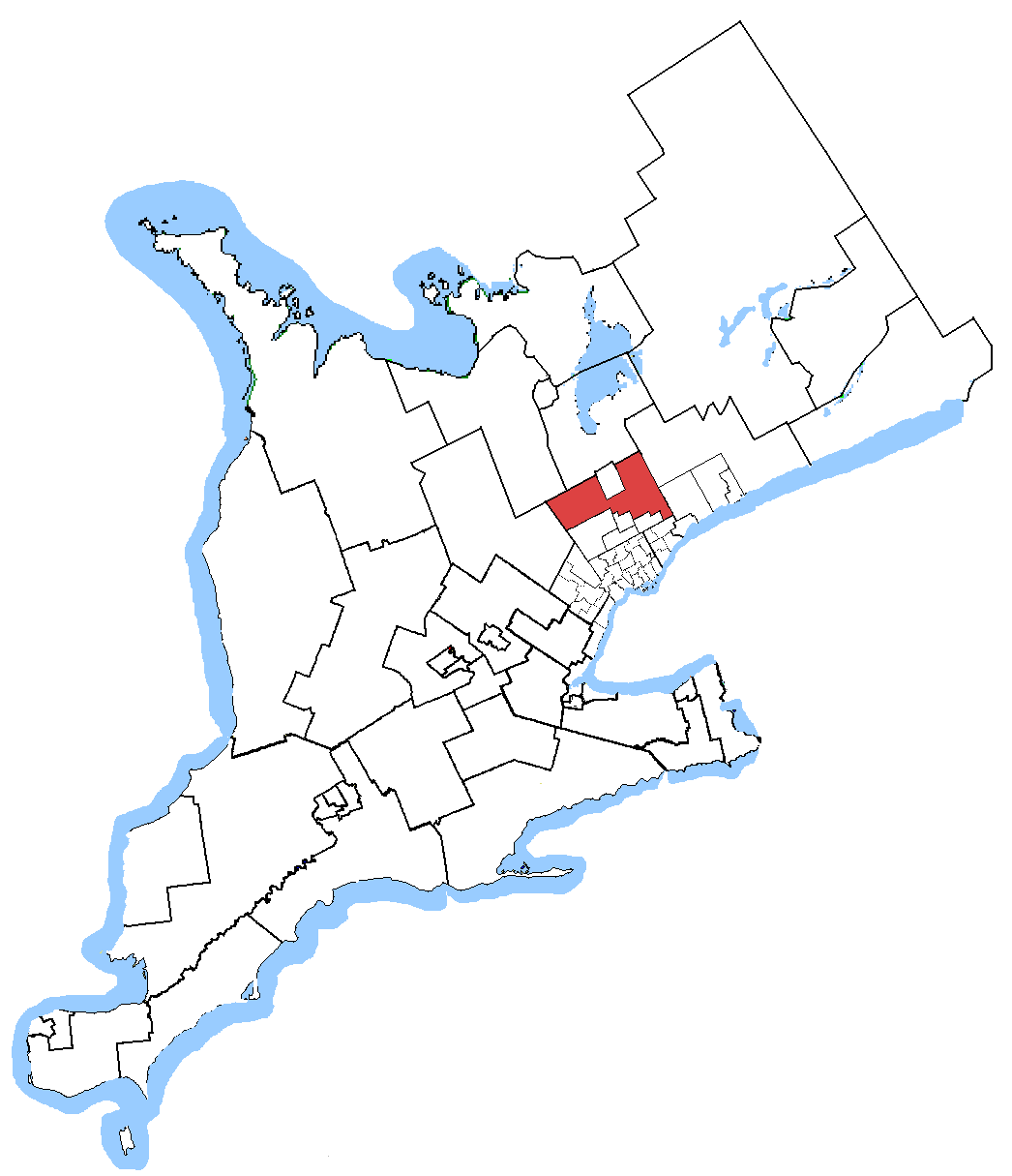
- Oak Ridges—Markham is in south-central Ontario, just north of Toronto
- Coordinates: 43°55′45″N 79°31′37″W; Location of the federal district constituency office in King City (as of 26 August 2010)

Defunct provincial electoral district
- Legislature: Legislative Assembly of Ontario
- District created: 2005
- District abolished: 2018
- First contested: 2007
- Last contested: 2014

Demographics
- Population (2011): 228,997
- Electors (2011): 151,584
- Area (km²): 718
- Census division: York
- Census subdivision(s): Markham, Richmond Hill, Whitchurch–Stouffville, King

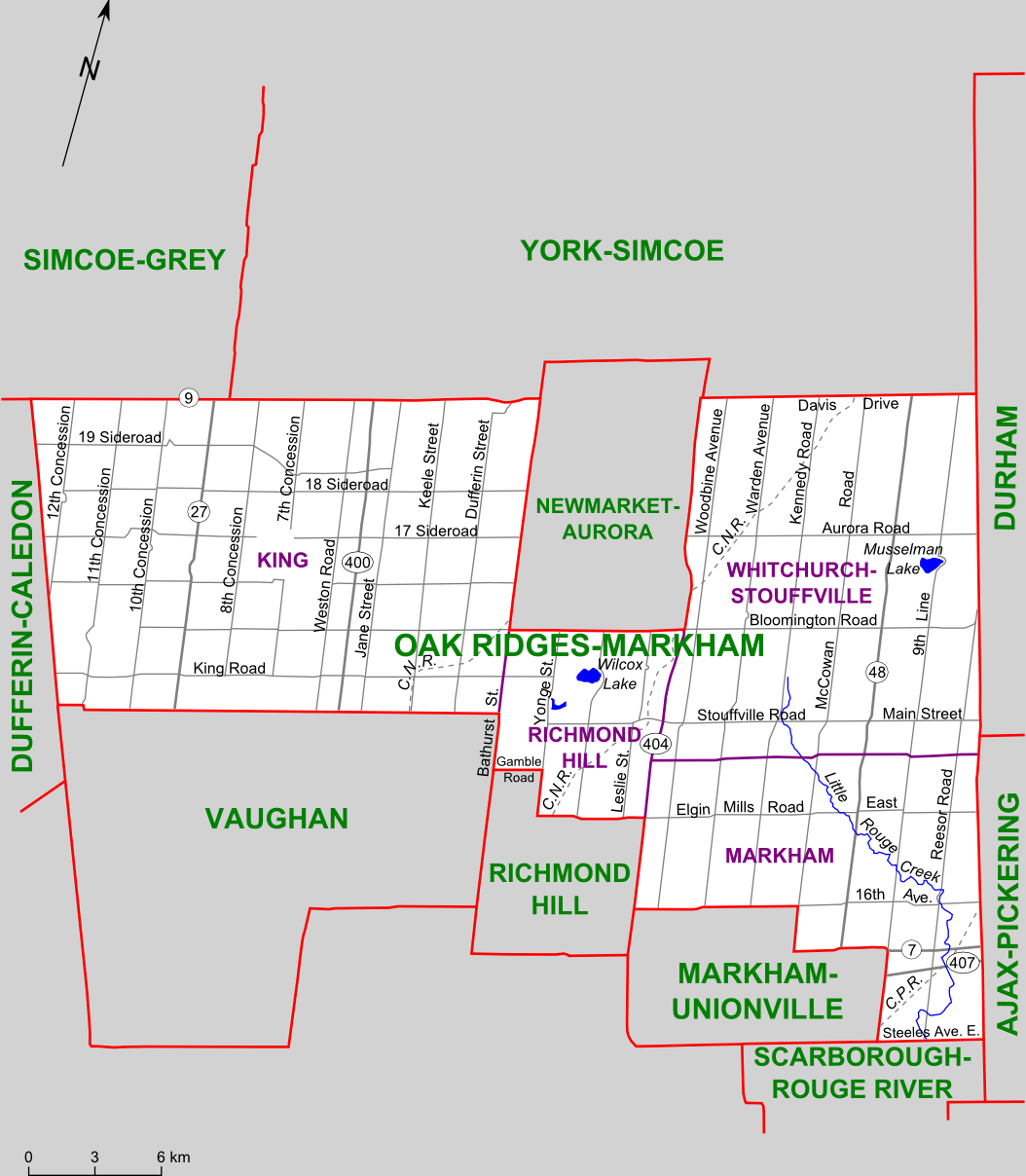
Map of Oak Ridges-Markham

Oak Ridges—Markham was a provincial electoral district in Ontario, Canada, that was represented in the Legislative Assembly of Ontario between the 2007 provincial election and the 2018 provincial election. Its population in 2006 was 169,645, with 136,755 electors, the highest of any riding in Ontario. It was the fastest growing riding in the province, having experienced a 52.5% increase in population from 2001 to 2006.

The district covered part of the suburbs north of Toronto. It included the town of Whitchurch–Stouffville, most of the township of King (excepting extreme northeast) the northern portions of the town of Richmond Hill (including all of Oak Ridges), and the northern and eastern portions of the city of Markham.

The electoral district was created in 2004 52.5% from Oak Ridges, 30% from Markham, 13% from Vaughan—King—Aurora district and 4.5% from York North riding.

In 2018, the district was dissolved into Markham—Stouffville, King—Vaughan, Markham—Unionville and Aurora—Oak Ridges—Richmond Hill.

== Demographics ==
Communities in Oak Ridges—Markham are the destination for many immigrants to Canada, composing about 41.6% of the population, or about 70,000 of its residents. For 72,440 residents, neither English nor French, the official languages of Canada, is their mother tongue, though most have knowledge of English (148,975), French (160), or both (12,885). Most immigrants become citizens, as 11,155 immigrants were not Canadian citizens as of the Canada 2006 Census.

The primarily urban district has a low proportion of Aboriginal residents compared to other parts of Canada, with just 625 people identifying themselves of such descent. It is also home to 70,070 residents who identify themselves as visible minorities, more than half of which are Chinese Canadians and about 20% are Black Canadians.

At the 2006 census, the participation rate of residents in the work force was 71.3%, and the electoral district unemployment rate was 5%, below the national average of 6.3%.

The district was the second-largest electoral district in Ontario by population, next to Brampton West which had 170,422 residents at the 2006 census.

== Geography ==
The riding consists of part of the Regional Municipality of York including:

1. the Town of Whitchurch-Stouffville;
2. the part of the Township of King to the south of Highway No. 9;
3. the part of the Town of Richmond Hill to the north and east of Gamble Road, Yonge Street, and Elgin Mills Road East; and
4. the part of the City of Markham to the north and east of 16th Avenue, McCowan Road, Highway No. 7, and 9th Line.

== Communities represented ==
- Ballantrae
- Gormley
- Kettleby
- King City
- Lake Wilcox
- Lloydtown
- Markham
- Nobleton
- Oak Ridges
- Pottageville
- Schomberg
- Snowball
- Temperanceville
- Whitchurch–Stouffville

== Members of Provincial Parliament ==
Oak Ridges—Markham
Assembly	Years	Member	Party
Riding created from Markham, Vaughan—King—Aurora and York North
39th	2007–2011	Helena Jaczek	Liberal
40th	2011–2014	Helena Jaczek	Liberal
41st	2014–2018	Helena Jaczek	Liberal
Riding dissolved into Markham—Stouffville, King—Vaughan, Markham—Unionville and Aurora—Oak Ridges—Richmond Hill

== Election results ==
2014 Ontario general election
Party	Candidate	Votes	%	±%	Expenditures
Liberal	Helena Jaczek	36,782	45.55	+0.74	$92,420.12
Progressive Conservative	Farid Wassef	30,259	37.47	+0.23	$173,298.00
New Democratic	Miles Krauter	9,355	11.58	−1.55	$4,568.86
Green	Emilia Melara	2,791	3.46	+0.98	$0.00
Libertarian	Karl Boelling	1,358	1.68	+0.07	$0.00
Trillium	Gennady Vilensky	213	0.26	N/A	$0.00
Total valid votes		80,755	100.00		
Total rejected, unmarked and declined ballots		1,156	1.43		
Turnout		81,911	46.21		
Eligible voters		177,255			
Liberal hold		Swing		+0.26	
Source(s) "Election Night Results – General Election Results by District – 059, Oak Ridges—Markham – Unofficial". Elections Ontario.

2011 Ontario general election
Party	Candidate	Votes	%	±%	Expenditures
Liberal	Helena Jaczek	28,878	44.78	−3.43	$83,066.00
Progressive Conservative	Farid Wassef	23,950	37.14	+1.07	$146,606.59
New Democratic	Joe Whitfeld	8,548	13.26	+5.33	$11,142.60
Green	Trifon Haitas	1,569	2.43	−4.01	$350.00
Libertarian	Karl Boelling	1,057	1.64		$213.07
Independent	Ruida Lu	484	0.75		$2,766.14
Total valid votes / expense limit		64,486	100.00	+8.85	$180,834,78
Total rejected, unmarked and declined ballots		395	0.61	−0.13	
Turnout		64,881	42.70	−5.07	
Eligible voters		151,959		+21.63	
Liberal hold		Swing		−2.25	
Source(s) "Summary of valid votes cast for each candidate – October 6, 2011 General Election" (PDF). Elections Ontario. 2011-11-18. "Statistical Summary" ( XLS Spreadsheet). Elections Ontario. 2013-10-01. "2011 Candidate Campaign Returns - CR-1". Elections Ontario.

2007 Ontario general election
Party	Candidate	Votes	%
Liberal	Helena Jaczek	28,564	48.22
Progressive Conservative	Phil Bannon	21,367	36.07
New Democratic	Janice Hagan	4,698	7.93
Green	Attila Nagy	3,815	6.44
Family Coalition	Patrick Redmond	455	0.77
Independent	Doug Ransom	342	0.58
Total valid votes		59,241	100.0
Total rejected ballots		444	0.74
Turnout		59,685	47.77
Eligible voters		124,939	
Sources:"Summary of valid votes cast for each candidate – October 10, 2007 General Election" (PDF). Elections Ontario. 2008-08-14. "Statistical Summary" (PDF). Elections Ontario. 2008-05-08.

== 2007 electoral reform referendum ==
2007 Ontario electoral reform referendum
Side	Votes	%
First Past the Post	35,444	61.7
Mixed member proportional	21,975	38.3
Total valid votes	57,419	100.0

== Sources ==
- Elections Ontario Past Election Results
