= Paul Calandra =

Canadian politician (born 1970)

The Honourable Paul Calandra ECO MPP
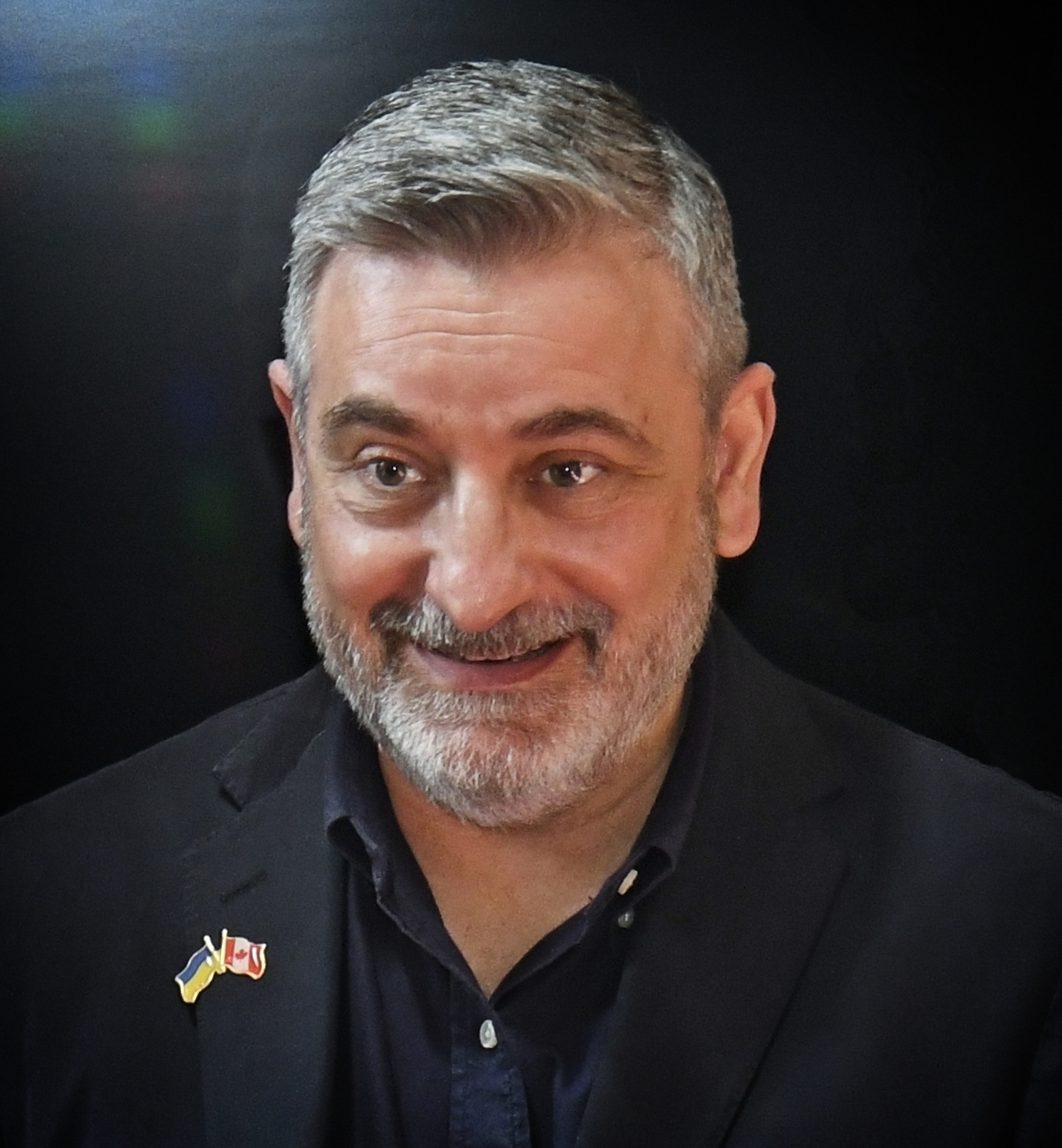
- Calandra in 2023

Minister of Education
- Incumbent
- Assumed office March 19, 2025
- Premier: Doug Ford
- Preceded by: Jill Dunlop

Minister of Municipal Affairs and Housing
- In office September 5, 2023 – March 19, 2025
- Premier: Doug Ford
- Preceded by: Steve Clark
- Succeeded by: Rob Flack

Government House Leader
- In office June 20, 2019 – June 6, 2024
- Premier: Doug Ford
- Preceded by: Todd Smith
- Succeeded by: Steve Clark

Member of the Ontario Provincial Parliament for Markham—Stouffville
- Incumbent
- Assumed office June 7, 2018
- Preceded by: Helena Jaczek (Note: Oak Ridges-Markham)

Minister of Long-Term Care
- In office January 14, 2022 – September 4, 2023
- Premier: Doug Ford
- Preceded by: Rod Phillips
- Succeeded by: Stan Cho

Minister of Legislative Affairs
- In office October 19, 2021 – June 6, 2024
- Premier: Doug Ford
- Preceded by: Position established
- Succeeded by: Position merged with Minister of Infrastructure

Parliamentary Assistant to the Minister of Energy, Northern Development and Mines (Energy)
- In office June 29, 2018 – June 20, 2019
- Preceded by: Han Dong
- Succeeded by: Position abolished

Member of Parliament for Oak Ridges—Markham
- In office October 14, 2008 – August 4, 2015
- Preceded by: Lui Temelkovski
- Succeeded by: Constituency abolished

Parliamentary Secretary to the Prime Minister of Canada for Intergovernmental Affairs
- In office September 19, 2013 – November 3, 2015
- Preceded by: Dean Del Mastro
- Succeeded by: Adam Vaughan

Personal details
- Born: May 13, 1970 (age 56) Markham, Ontario, Canada
- Party: Progressive Conservative
- Other political affiliations: Conservative; Canadian Alliance

Paul A. Calandra ECO MPP (born May 13, 1970) is a Canadian politician who has served as the Ontario minister of education since 2025. A member of the Ontario Progressive Conservative (PC) Party, Calandra represents Markham—Stouffville in the Legislative Assembly of Ontario. He was previously the Ontario minister of municipal affairs and housing from 2023 to 2025, the Ontario minister of long-term care from 2022 to 2023, and the Ontario government house leader from 2019 to 2024.

He previously sat in the federal House of Commons from 2008 to 2015 for the Conservative Party, serving as a parliamentary secretary to Prime Minister Stephen Harper from 2013 to 2015. In the 2015 federal election, he was a candidate in the Markham—Stouffville riding, created as a result of the federal electoral redistribution of 2012, and was defeated by Jane Philpott. Upon his defeat in 2015 he was recognized for his work within the community In the aftermath of an election celebration

== Education ==
Calandra studied history with a minor in political science. He obtained a 3-year bachelor's degree from Carleton University in November 2008.

== Early career ==
Prior to entering politics, Calandra worked in the insurance business from 1995 to 2003. He then served as chief of staff to Steve Gilchrist, who was the PC MPP for Scarborough East in the Mike Harris government.

== Family dispute ==
In 2005, Calandra was involved in a family dispute. In the early 2000s, he had power of attorney to manage his mother's affairs. In a lawsuit filed by his sisters, it was claimed the power of attorney had been revoked by his mother months before her death in August 2005, but Calandra had invoked it for personal gain. Calandra's sisters alleged that he had charged $8,000 to his mother's credit card without her knowledge. In his statement of defence, Calandra said that the charges had been authorized. The sisters also alleged that Calandra took $25,000 from his mother to pay taxes, but instead wrote the cheque to himself and left the taxes unpaid. Calandra claimed in his statement of defence that the money was given to him by his mother "freely, without pretext, and of her own volition." A document filed on September 8, 2008, the first full day of the 2008 federal election campaign, said that the parties had settled the case out of court.

== Politics ==
Calandra ran as the Canadian Alliance candidate in the 2000 federal election in the Toronto riding of Scarborough East. He was defeated by Liberal incumbent John McKay by 16,460 votes. He ran eight years later in the 2008 federal election as the Conservative candidate in the York Region riding of Oak Ridges—Markham. He defeated Liberal incumbent Lui Temelkovski by 545 votes. He was re-elected in 2011, defeating Temelkovski again, this time by 20,680 votes.

Following his election in 2008, in Calandra's first term, he sat on the Access to Information, Privacy, and Ethics Committee, Citizenship and Immigration Committee, and the Government Operations and Estimates Committee.

During this term, he also introduced two private member's bills. On June 19, 2009, he introduced 'An Act to Change the Name of the Electoral District of Oak Ridges—Markham’, and on March 11, 2011, he introduced 'An Act Respecting the Establishment of a National Strategy for the Purchase and Sale of Second-Hand Precious Metal Articles‘. Neither of these bills proceeded past first reading. During his tenure as Member of Parliament for Oak Ridges—Markham, Calandra advocated on behalf of residents opposed to the proposed construction of a cellular communications tower in Stouffville. He raised constituents’ concerns regarding the tower's proposed location and supported efforts to have the project reconsidered through the federal consultation process."Stouffville residents back MP's efforts to stop cell tower". YorkRegion.com. Metroland Media.

In addition to his legislative duties, Calandra supported community fundraising initiatives in his constituency. He organised the annual “Hockey Night in Stouffville” charity event, which brought together current and former National Hockey League players to raise funds for local charitable organizations and community programs. The event featured NHL alumni alongside local participants and highlighted community support for amateur hockey and local charities."NHLers, past, present skating in Hockey Night in Stouffville". YorkRegion.com. Metroland Media. Calandra was very active in honouring veterans and was instrumental in organizing the first Veterans Banner program in Markham and Stouffville (an initiative he reprised as a provincial MPPStouffville, MPP Calandra unveil 24 new Remembrance Day banners) and organised a successful Military Parade that was very popular but did draw criticism from the local Mennonite community. Large crowd welcomes military parade https://cameracombo.wordpress.com/2012/06/16/governor-generals-horse-guards-visit-stouffville/

=== Parliamentary secretary to the minister of Canadian heritage and official languages ===
He was re-elected in the 2011 election and was subsequently appointed parliamentary secretary to the minister of Canadian heritage and official languages where he sat on the Standing Committee for Canadian Heritage and formerly the Standing Committee on Bill C-11.

=== Parliamentary secretary to the prime minister ===
In September 2013, Paul Calandra was appointed parliamentary secretary to the prime minister and minister of intergovernmental affairs.

As parliamentary secretary, Calandra often fielded questions on behalf of Prime Minister Harper during the Canadian Senate expenses scandal (2013). This brought Calandra under a great deal of scrutiny for his perceived non-answers, deflections, and attacks, and prompted widespread backlash in the form of media articles. After his defeat in the 2015 election, Calandra reflected on the loss and his time as parliamentary secretary to the prime minister.

=== 2015 general election ===
He was defeated by Jane Philpott in the Markham—Stouffville riding, created as a result of the federal electoral redistribution of 2012. In a CBC interview https://www.cbc.ca/news/politics/paul-calandra-niqab-c24-conservative-mistakes-1.3291271 Calandra reflected on his loss and his time in federal politics.

=== Entry into provincial politics ===
In September 2016 Calandra announced that he would be seeking the Ontario PC nomination for the provincial riding of Markham-Stouffville. On November 11, it was announced that Calandra won the nomination and would represent the PCs in the 2018 provincial election.

In the 2018 Ontario general election, Calandra won the riding of Markham-Stouffville, defeating Liberal incumbent Helena Jaczek. On June 29, 2018, Calandra was appointed as the parliamentary assistant to the minister of energy, northern development and mines (energy). He was re-elected in the 2022 Ontario general election with 48.42% of the vote.

=== Provincial cabinet ===
Calandra was appointed to the provincial cabinet of Premier Doug Ford in 2019 as government house leader and minister without portfolio.

Government House Leader

As House Leader Calandra initiated a serious of standing order changes that led to the modernization of the Assembly and proceedings in the chamber. The first set of changes introduced in 2019. https://www.ola.org/en/legislative-business/house-documents/parliament-42/session-1/2019-11-27/orders-notices Calandra also brought in changes to the Standing Orders that allowed Indigenous Members to speak in their language with full translation and Hansard also in the language spoken. https://www.cbc.ca/news/canada/toronto/mpp-sol-mamakwa-oji-cree-ontario-legislature-1.7216763

He was later promoted to a full minister in 2021, becoming the first and only minister of legislative affairs. In 2022, Calandra assumed the role of minister of long-term care, following the resignation of Rod Philips. In September 2023, he was named minister of municipal affairs and housing following the resignation of Steve Clark. Following Calandra's appointment as minister of education in 2025, he began appointing supervisors to take over several of Ontario's school boards. The government's Bill 33 gives the education ministry more power over school boards. In early 2026, the Ford government announced changes to Ontario Student Assistance Program and the powers of elected trustees.In May 2026 Calandra was voted the most influential member of the Ontario Cabinet QPB Survey: Insiders rank Calandra, Lecce and Flack as Ford government’s top ministers

== Electoral record ==
2022 Ontario general election: Markham—Stouffville
Party	Candidate	Votes	%	±%
Progressive Conservative	Paul Calandra	21,176	48.43	+0.31
Liberal	Kelly Dunn	15,512	35.48	+9.46
New Democratic	Kingsley Kwok	4,137	9.46	−10.96
Green	Myles O'Brien	1,723	3.94	−0.06
New Blue	Jennifer Gowland	658	1.50	
Ontario Party	Michele Petit	517	1.18	
Total valid votes		43,723	100.0	
Total rejected, unmarked, and declined ballots		229		
Turnout		43,952	44.51	
Eligible voters		96,810		
Progressive Conservative hold		Swing		−4.58
Source(s): "Summary of Valid Votes Cast for Each Candidate" (PDF). Elections Ontario. 2022. Archived from the original on May 18, 2023.; "Statistical Summary by Electoral District" (PDF). Elections Ontario. 2022. Archived from the original on May 21, 2023.

2018 Ontario general election: Markham—Stouffville
Party	Candidate	Votes	%	±%
Progressive Conservative	Paul Calandra	25,912	48.12	+14.03
Liberal	Helena Jaczek	14,007	26.01	–22.46
New Democratic	Kingsley Kwok	10,997	20.42	+8.30
Green	Jose Etcheverry	2,153	4.00	+0.34
Libertarian	Paul Balfour	660	1.23	N/A
Moderate	Yuri Duboisky	117	0.22	N/A
Total valid votes		53,846	100.0	
Progressive Conservative notional gain from Liberal		Swing		+18.25
Source: Elections Ontario

2015 Canadian federal election: Markham—Stouffville
Party	Candidate	Votes	%	±%	Expenditures
Liberal	Jane Philpott	29,416	49.21	+20.26	$112,011.35
Conservative	Paul Calandra	25,565	42.77	-7.72	$164,609.85
New Democratic	Gregory Hines	3,647	6.10	-10.88	$7,176.28
Green	Myles O'Brien	1,145	1.92	-0.81	$1,395.62
Total valid votes/Expense limit		59,773	100.00		$225,802.37
Total rejected ballots		189	0.32		
Turnout		59,962	68.56		
Eligible voters		87,460			
Liberal notional gain from Conservative		Swing		+13.99	
Source: Elections Canada

2011 Canadian federal election: Oak Ridges—Markham
Party	Candidate	Votes	%	±%	Expenditures
Conservative	Paul Calandra	46,241	51.12	+8.88	$133,192
Liberal	Lui Temelkovski	25,561	28.26	-13.26	$108,951
New Democratic	Janice Hagan	15,229	16.84	+7.45	$4,650
Green	Trifon Haitas	2,349	2.60	-4.23	$0.00
Progressive Canadian	John Sicilano	1,080	1.19	–	$564
Total valid votes/Expense limit		90,460	100.00	–	$134,351
Total rejected ballots		430	0.47	–	
Turnout		90,890	59.96	+4.30	
Eligible voters		151,584	–	–	
Conservative hold		Swing		+11.07%	

2008 Canadian federal election: Oak Ridges—Markham
Party	Candidate	Votes	%	±%
Conservative	Paul Calandra	32,028	42.2%	+ 3.7%
Liberal	Lui Temelkovski	31,483	41.5%	5.5%
New Democratic	Andy Arifin	7,126	9.4%	0.5%
Green	Richard Taylor	5,184	6.8%	+ 2.2%
Total valid votes		75,821	–	+1.80%
Turnout		–	61.26%	

2000 Canadian federal election: Scarborough East
Party	Candidate	Votes	%	Expenditures
Liberal	John McKay	24,019	59.82	$37,639
Alliance	Paul Calandra	7,559	18.83	$32,135
Progressive Conservative	Paul McCrossan	6,284	15.65	$26,016
New Democratic	Denise Lake	1,884	4.69	$4,973
Canadian Action	Dave Glover	292	0.73	none listed
Marxist–Leninist	France Tremblay	113	0.28	$8
Total valid votes		40,151	100.00	
Total rejected ballots		155		
Turnout		40,306	55.91	
Electors on the lists		72,092		
Sources: Official Results, Elections Canada and Financial Returns, Elections Canada.
