= Helena Konanz =

Canadian politician and tennis player

Helena Konanz MP
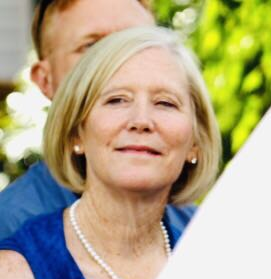
- Konanz in 2019

Member of Parliament for Similkameen—South Okanagan—West Kootenay
- Incumbent
- Assumed office April 28, 2025
- Preceded by: Richard Cannings

Penticton City Councillor
- In office December 2011 – December 2019
- In office December 2020 – May 2025

Personal details
- Born: Helena Manset; February 1, 1961 (age 65) Santa Barbara, California
- Party: Conservative Party of Canada
- Tennis career
- Country (sports): USA
- Plays: Right-handed
- Prize money: $26,589

Singles
- Career record: 26/37
- Career titles: 0
- Highest ranking: No. 214 (December 21, 1986)

Doubles
- Career record: 17–27
- Career titles: 1
- Highest ranking: No. 228 (August 3, 1987)

Grand Slam doubles results
- French Open: 1R (1984, 1985)
- Wimbledon: 1R (1984)
- US Open: 1R (1982, 1983, 1984)

Helena Konanz MP (née Manset; born February 1, 1961) is an American-born Canadian politician and former tennis player. She was elected Member of Parliament (MP) for Similkameen—South Okanagan—West Kootenay in the 2025 Canadian federal election for the Conservative Party of Canada.

== College career ==
Manset attended the University of California, Los Angeles for her undergraduate degree, where she was a part of the UCLA Bruins women's tennis team, which won the 1981 AIAW National Championship. In 1982, Manset as well as her partner Kathy O'Brien were defeated in the finals of the NCAA Women's Doubles and in 1982 and 1983 she was named as an All-American. She graduated from UCLA in 1984 with a degree in political science.

== Professional career ==
After being narrowly defeated in the NCAA Women's Doubles Finals Manset began to compete professionally. Manset had competed across the world including in the US Open and Wimbledon. She reached her peak in 1987 when she was ranked 228 overall in women's doubles. She retired from professional tennis on August 17, 1987 after 5 years as a pro player.

== Political career ==
After she retired from tennis Manset began working for Nike which eventually lead to her moving to Canada to manage the first Sport Chek in British Columbia in 1992. After spending some time in the private sector, Manset (now Konanz) ran for the Penticton City Council and won with 3,737 votes. Konanz was re-elected in 2014.

In 2018, Konanz opted not to seek re-election and instead announced her candidacy for the Conservative Party of Canada for the 2019 Canadian federal election for the district of South Okanagan—West Kootenay. In September of the same year Konanz won the nomination and was formally announced as the riding's candidate by the Conservatives. In the election, held in October 2019, Konanz finished a close second to New Democratic Party incumbent Richard Cannings. In 2021, a rematch resulted in Cannings winning with an increased plurality.

In 2022 Konanz was once again elected to Penticton City Council. In the 2025 election she was elected the Member of Parliament for the newly created riding of Similkameen—South Okanagan—West Kootenay.

== Personal life ==
Manset grew up in Santa Barbara, California and later married Adam Konanz, changing her name to Helena Konanz in 1995. The couple have two children.

== ITF & WTA Tour finals ==
=== Doubles (1–2) ===
Result	Date	Tournament	Surface	Partner	Opponents	Score
Win	Mar 1987	Fresno, CA, US	Hard	(United States) Lisa Seemann	(United States) Debbie Graham (United States) Cinda Gurney	6–3, 1–6, 7–6^{(7–5)}
Loss	Jul 1985	Schenectady, NY, US	Hard	(United States) Cecilia Fernandez-Parker	(United States) Linda Gates (United States) Lynn Lewis	6–7, 4–6
Loss	Oct 1983	Tokyo, Japan	Hard	(United States) Micki Schillig	(Australia) Chris O’Neil (Australia) Pam Whytcross	3–6, 5–7

== Electoral record ==
2025 Canadian federal election: Similkameen—South Okanagan—West Kootenay
** Preliminary results — Not yet official **
Party	Candidate	Votes	%	±%	Expenditures
Conservative	Helena Konanz	30,073	44.08	+6.50	
Liberal	Gloria Morgan	25,390	37.22	+23.99	
New Democratic	Linda Sankey	11,033	16.17	–22.80	
Green	Philip Mansfield	1,065	1.56	–1.79	
People's	Barry Dewar	660	0.97	–5.90	
Total valid votes/expense limit					
Total rejected ballots					
Turnout		68,221	71.61		
Eligible voters		95,268			
Conservative notional gain from New Democratic		Swing		–8.75	
Source: Elections Canada

2021 Canadian federal election: South Okanagan—West Kootenay
Party	Candidate	Votes	%	±%	Expenditures
New Democratic	Richard Cannings	27,595	41.3	+4.9	$90,281.81
Conservative	Helena Konanz	23,675	35.5	+0.3	$133,978.75
Liberal	Ken Robertson	8,159	12.2	-5.0	$29,578.37
People's	Sean Taylor	4,866	7.3	+4.9	none listed
Green	Tara Howse	2,485	3.7	-4.6	$7,900.41
Total valid votes/expense limit		66,780	99.4	–	$137,054.79
Total rejected ballots		434	0.6		
Turnout		67,214	65.6		
Eligible voters		102,433			
New Democratic hold		Swing		+2.3	
Source: Elections Canada

2019 Canadian federal election: South Okanagan—West Kootenay
Party	Candidate	Votes	%	±%	Expenditures
New Democratic	Richard Cannings	24,809	36.4	-0.88	$121,393.67
Conservative	Helena Konanz	24,053	35.2	+5.36	none listed
Liberal	Connie Denesiuk	11,705	17.2	-10.93	$60,410.04
Green	Tara-Lyn Howse	5,672	8.3	+4.11	$10,551.96
People's	Sean Taylor	1,638	2.4		$6,237.32
Independent	Carolina Marie Hopkins	359	0.2		$77.17
Total valid votes/expense limit		68,196	100.0		
Total rejected ballots		381			
Turnout		68,577	69.56		
Eligible voters		98,589			
New Democratic hold		Swing		-3.12	
Source: Elections Canada
