= Richard Cannings (British Columbia politician) =

Canadian biologist, author, and politician

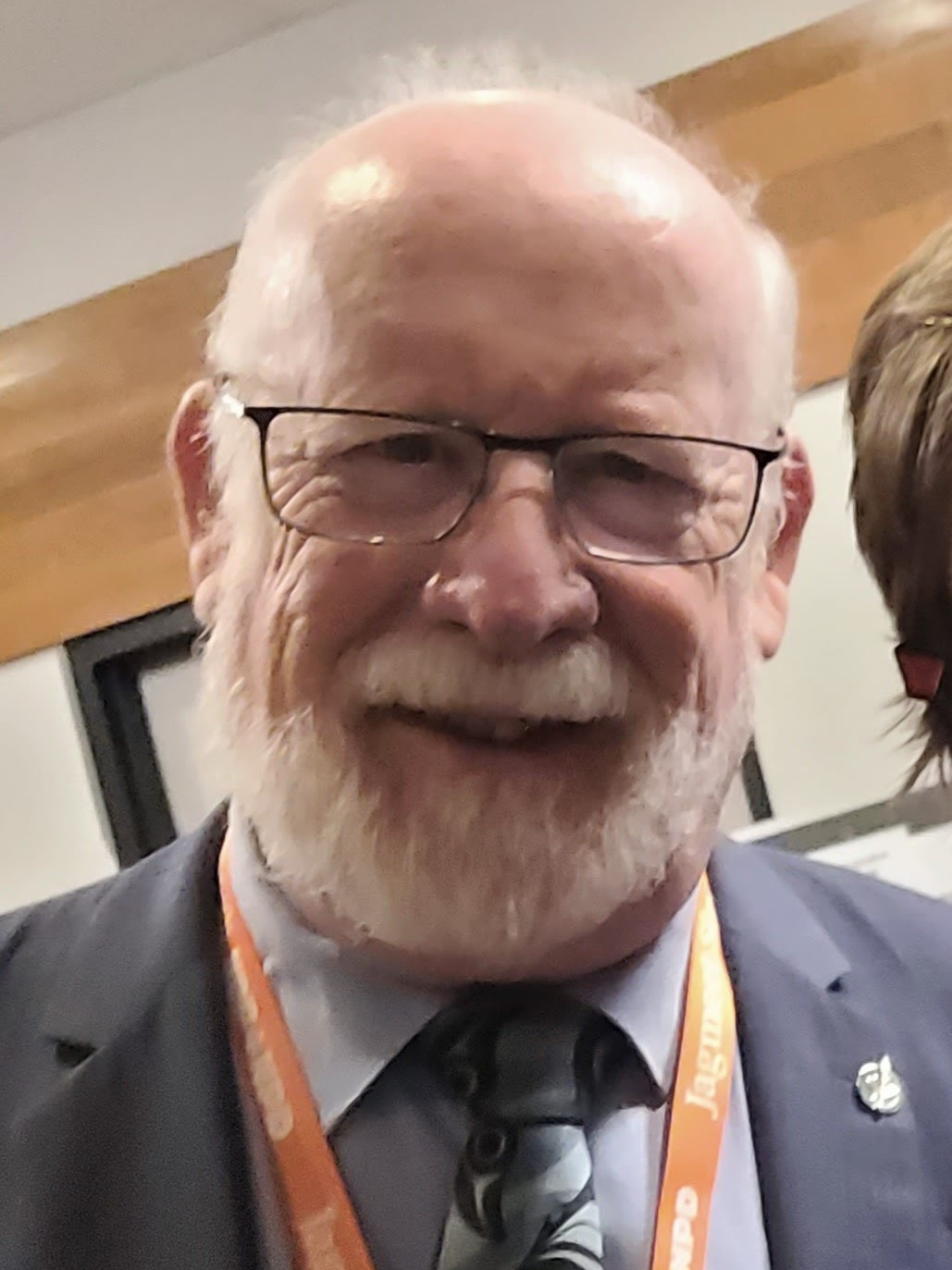
- Cannings in 2023

Member of Parliament for South Okanagan—West Kootenay
- In office October 19, 2015 – March 23, 2025
- Preceded by: Alex Atamanenko
- Succeeded by: Helena Konanz

Personal details
- Born: March 31, 1954 (age 72) Penticton, British Columbia, Canada
- Party: New Democratic
- Profession: Biologist, author
- Website: richardcannings.ndp.ca

Richard J. "Dick" Cannings (born March 31, 1954) is a Canadian biologist, author and politician. He was elected as the South Okanagan—West Kootenay Member of Parliament in the 2015 Canadian federal election for the New Democratic Party, and re-elected in 2019 and 2021. He did not run for re-election in 2025. As a member of the 42nd Canadian Parliament he sponsored three private member's bills: one to promote the use of wood in federal public works projects, one to add various lakes and rivers to Navigable Waters Protection Act, and another to a Minister of Environment to respond to a Committee on the Status of Endangered Wildlife in Canada report. Cannings was appointed the NDP Critic for Post-Secondary Education as well as the Deputy Critic for Natural Resources in the 42nd Canadian Parliament. He became the NDP Critic for Natural Resources in 2016 and served in that position until 2021. In October 2021, he became the NDP Critic for Emergency Preparedness (Climate Adaptation) and Critic for Small Business and Tourism, as well as Deputy Critic for Natural Resources and Deputy Critic for Innovation, Science and Industry. In December 2021, he was named an inaugural member of the House of Commons Standing Committee on Science and Research.

Prior to being elected as a member of parliament, Cannings unsuccessfully sought election as a member of the legislative assembly of British Columbia in the 2013 BC election. Prior to his involvement in politics, Cannings worked as a biologist specializing in birds, taught at the University of British Columbia for 17 years, wrote numerous books about birds and natural history, and was a member of the Committee on the Status of Endangered Wildlife in Canada for 8 years. He is an alumnus of Memorial University of Newfoundland and the University of British Columbia.

== Career ==
Like their father, renowned environmentalist Stephen Cannings, Richard and his twin brother Sydney and their older brother, Rob, were born and raised in Penticton and all pursued careers in biology. Richard earned a master's degree in zoology from Memorial University of Newfoundland. He taught for 17 years at University of British Columbia before returning to Penticton in 1995 to work as a consulting biologist, including doing work for the non-profit Bird Studies Canada. He spent 8 years on the Committee on the Status of Endangered Wildlife in Canada as co-chair for Birds, 11 years on B.C. Environmental Appeal Board and five on the B.C. Forest Appeals Commission. He was a board member of the Nature Conservancy of Canada from 2006 to 2015.

Cannings authored or contributed to numerous books. In 1987 he co-authored with his brothers Birds of the Okanagan Valley, British Columbia which was published by the Royal British Columbia Museum. Based on previous work, he co-authored Birds of Southwestern British Columbia and Birds of Interior BC and the Rockies In 2007 Greystone Books published a memoir style book of essays by Cannings titled An Enchantment of Birds: Memories From A Birder's Life and in 2010 Greystone published a book of essays, titled Flights of Imagination: Extraordinary Writing about Birds, edited by Cannings. Co-authored with his son Russell, Cannings contributed to Birdfinding in British Columbia and Best Places to Bird in British Columbia, both also published by Greystone.

== Politics ==
At 58 years old, Cannings entered politics in 2012 seeking the British Columbia New Democratic Party nomination in Penticton. Cannings won the nomination over Summerland councillor David Finnis. However, in the 2013 election, Cannings lost to Penticton mayor Dan Ashton of the BC Liberal Party, which went on to form a majority government with the BC NDP as the official opposition.

Cannings continued with politics by seeking the federal NDP nomination in South Okanagan—West Kootenay. He won the nomination over Margaret Maximenko of Christina Lake. In the 2015 election, Cannings won the riding with 37% of the vote. Nationally, the NDP placed third with the Liberal Party forming a majority government.

During ensuing 42nd Parliament Cannings was appointed by NDP leader Thomas Mulcair as their critic on post-secondary education issues and deputy critic of natural resources under Carol Hughes. He became critic of natural resources in 2016 when Carol Hughes was named Assistant Deputy Speaker, and he served the entire Parliament on the Standing Committee on Natural Resources. Cannings sponsored three private member bills. On April 13, 2017, he introduced Bill C-354 which would amend the Public Works and Government Services Act which would promote the use of wood in federal public works projects. Similar bills had previously been introduced by Claude Patry and Gérard Asselin in the 41st and 40th Parliaments, respectively. The bill was passed by the House of Commons with support from all parties except the Conservative Party but was blocked from proceeding in the Senate by the Conservatives. In response to the previous parliament's Jobs and Growth Act, Cannings second private member bill, Bill C-360, sought to re-insert several lakes and rivers such as Skaha Lake, Vaseux Lake, Tuc-el-nuit Lake, Osoyoos Lake, Christina Lake, Okanagan River, Slocan River, Kettle River, and Granby River back into the Navigable Waters Protection Act. However, Bill C-360 did not advance past first reading as the government bill C-69 was amending the same act to re-define what water bodies and watercourses are deemed to be reviewable as navigable waters. He introduced his third private member bill, Bill C-363, on September 22, 2017, as a response to the practice used by the Ministers of Environment in the 28th Canadian Ministry between 2011 and 2015 of avoiding listing species in the Species at risk Public Registry by not notifying the Governor in Council of reports received from the Committee on the Status of Endangered Wildlife in Canada. Though Bill C-363, which would require the Minister notify the Governor in Council and recommend to list a species or not, did not advance but it was adopted as a Ministry of Environment operational policy.

In the 2019 Canadian federal election, Cannings was narrowly re-elected over the second-place Conservative, Penticton city councillor Helena Konanz. He was again re-elected in the 2021 federal election.

In September 2023, Cannings announced he would not seek re-election in the 2025 federal election.

Cannings endorsed Alberta MP Heather McPherson in the 2026 New Democratic Party leadership election.

== Electoral record ==
=== Federal ===
2021 Canadian federal election: South Okanagan—West Kootenay
| Party | Candidate | Votes | % | ±% | Expenditures |
|---|---|---|---|---|---|
| New Democratic | Richard Cannings | 27,595 | 41.32 | +4.94 | $94,939.75 |
| Conservative | Helena Konanz | 23,675 | 35.45 | +0.24 | $134,452.43 |
| Liberal | Ken Robertson | 8,159 | 12.22 | –4.95 | $29,578.37 |
| People's | Sean Taylor | 4,866 | 7.29 | +4.88 | none listed |
| Green | Tara Howse | 2,485 | 3.72 | –4.60 | $7,900.41 |
| Total valid votes/expense limit | | 66,780 | 99.35 | – | $137,054.79 |
| Total rejected ballots | | 434 | 0.65 | +0.09 | |
| Turnout | | 67,214 | 65.06 | –3.74 | |
| Eligible voters | | 103,310 | | | |
| New Democratic hold | | Swing | | +2.35 | |
Source: Elections Canada

2019 Canadian federal election: South Okanagan—West Kootenay
| Party | Candidate | Votes | % | ±% | Expenditures |
|---|---|---|---|---|---|
| New Democratic | Richard Cannings | 24,809 | 36.38 | –0.90 | $108,764.07 |
| Conservative | Helena Konanz | 24,013 | 35.21 | +5.37 | $71,097.96 |
| Liberal | Connie Denesiuk | 11,705 | 17.16 | –10.96 | $60,146.11 |
| Green | Tara-Lyn Howse | 5,672 | 8.32 | +4.12 | $10,551.96 |
| People's | Sean Taylor | 1,638 | 2.40 | – | $6,237.32 |
| Independent | Carolina Marie Hopkins | 359 | 0.53 | – | $77.17 |
| Total valid votes/expense limit | | 68,196 | 99.44 | – | $130,238.20 |
| Total rejected ballots | | 381 | 0.56 | +0.23 | |
| Turnout | | 68,577 | 68.80 | –3.82 | |
| Eligible voters | | 99,676 | | | |
| New Democratic hold | | Swing | | –3.14 | |
Source: Elections Canada

2015 Canadian federal election: South Okanagan—West Kootenay
| Party | Candidate | Votes | % | ±% | Expenditures |
|---|---|---|---|---|---|
| New Democratic | Richard Cannings | 24,823 | 37.28 | –2.16 | $121,573.34 |
| Conservative | Marshall Neufeld | 19,871 | 29.84 | –14.93 | $156,966.44 |
| Liberal | Connie Denesiuk | 18,732 | 28.13 | +21.03 | $25,079.58 |
| Green | Samantha Troy | 2,792 | 4.19 | –3.94 | $153.48 |
| Independent | Brian Gray | 376 | 0.56 | – | none listed |
| Total valid votes/expense limit | | 66,594 | 99.68 | – | $247,730.42 |
| Total rejected ballots | | 216 | 0.32 | – | |
| Turnout | | 66,810 | 72.62 | – | |
| Eligible voters | | 91,999 | | | |
| New Democratic notional gain from Conservative | | Swing | | +6.39 | |
Source: Elections Canada

=== Provincial ===
2013 British Columbia general election: Penticton
| Party | Candidate | Votes | % | ±% | Expenditures |
|---|---|---|---|---|---|
| Liberal | Dan Ashton | 11,536 | 45.85 | +1.86 | $92,981 |
| New Democratic | Richard Cannings | 10,154 | 40.35 | +9.20 | $79,882 |
| Conservative | Sean Upshaw | 2,288 | 9.09 | +0.35 | $5,077 |
| BC First | Doug Maxwell | 1,185 | 4.71 | – | $5,228 |
| Total valid votes | | 25,163 | 100.00 | | |
| Total rejected ballots | | 173 | 0.68 | | |
| Turnout | | 25,336 | 58.27 | | |
Source: Elections BC

== Publications ==
- Birds of the Okanagan Valley, British Columbia - 1987
- Birds of Southwestern British Columbia - 2005
- The Rockies: A Natural History - 2005
- An Enchantment of Birds - 2007
- Birds of Interior BC and the Rockies - 2009
- Roadside Nature Tours through the Okanagan - 2009
- Flights of Imagination - 2010
- Geology of British Columbia: A Journey Through Time - 2011
- Birdfinding in British Columbia - 2013
- The New BC Roadside Naturalist - 2014
- British Columbia: A Natural History - 2015
- Birds of British Columbia and the Pacific Northwest - 2016
