= Queen's University Faculty of Health Sciences =

- Type: Public
- Parent institution: Queen's University at Kingston
- Dean: Jane Philpott
- Location: Kingston, Ontario, Canada
- Website: healthsci.queensu.ca

The Queen's University Faculty of Health Sciences is a faculty of Queen's University at Kingston in Kingston, Ontario, Canada. It contains three schools: the School of Medicine, the School of Nursing, and the School of Rehabilitation Therapy.

This faculty also administers Queen's University's highly competitive Life Sciences, Biochemistry, and Bachelor of Health Sciences programs.

The educational program leading to the Medical Doctor degree is central to the purpose of the faculty. It must meet all the requirements for accreditation and prepare graduates for postgraduate training leading to licensure and certification by the College of Family Physicians of Canada or the Royal College of Physicians and Surgeons of Canada.
