= Penticton-Summerland =

Provincial electoral district in British Columbia, Canada

British Columbia electoral district

Provincial electoral district
- Legislature: Legislative Assembly of British Columbia
MLA
Tracy St. Claire
Conservative
- First contested: 1991
- Last contested: 2026

Demographics
- Population (2021): 55,391
- Area (km²): 1,596
- Pop. density (per km²): 34.7
- Census division: Okanagan-Similkameen
- Census subdivision(s): Penticton, Summerland

Penticton-Summerland is a provincial electoral district in British Columbia that has been represented in the Legislative Assembly of British Columbia since 1991.

The district was previously known as Okanagan–Penticton (1991–2001), Penticton–Okanagan Valley (2001–2009), and Penticton (2009–2024). It adopted its current name and underwent modest boundary changes for the 2024 provincial election following the 2021 electoral redistribution.

== Demographics ==
Population, 2021	55,391
Area (km^{2})	1,596
Pop. Density (people per km^{2})	34
Source: BC Electoral Boundaries Commission

== Geography ==
As of the 2024 provincial election, Penticton comprises the northern portion of the Regional District of Okanagan-Similkameen. It is located in southern British Columbia. Communities in the electoral district consist of Penticton and Summerland.

== History ==
Okanagan-Penticton was created for the 1991 election from parts of the dual member ridings of Boundary-Similkameen and Okanagan South.

=== 1999 redistribution ===
The 1999 British Columbia electoral redistribution changed Okanagan-Penticton and the western portion of Okanagan-Boundary to Penticton-Okanagan Valley.

== Members of the Legislative Assembly ==
This district has elected the following members of the Legislative Assembly:

Assembly	Years	Member	Party
Okanagan-Penticton; Riding created from Boundary-Similkameen and Okanagan South
35th	1991–1996	Jim Beattie	New Democratic
36th	1996–2001	Rick Thorpe	Liberal
Penticton-Okanagan Valley
37th	2001–2005	Bill Barisoff	Liberal
38th	2005–2009	Bill Barisoff	Liberal
Penticton
39th	2009–2013	Bill Barisoff	Liberal
40th	2013–2017	Dan Ashton	Liberal
41st	2017–2020	Dan Ashton	Liberal
42nd	2020–2023	Dan Ashton	Liberal
42nd	2023–2024	Dan Ashton	BC United
Penticton-Summerland
43rd	2024–2025	Amelia Boultbee	Conservative
43rd	2025–2026	Amelia Boultbee	Independent
43rd	2026–2026	Amelia Boultbee	New Democratic
44th	2026–present	Tracy St. Claire	Conservative

== Electoral history ==
=== Penticton-Summerland ===
2026 British Columbia general election
The 2026 general election will be held on October 24.
Party	Candidate	Votes	%	±%	Expenditures
Conservative	Tracy St. Claire				
New Democratic	Tina Lee				
Green	Bradley Sean Bartsch				
OneBC	Warren Hamm				
Total valid votes					
Total rejected ballots					
Turnout					
Registered voters					
Note: Incumbent MLA Amelia Boultbee was elected in 2024 as a Conservative, but resigned from the caucus on October 20, 2025, and crossed the floor to the New Democratic caucus on July 3, 2026. She is not running for re-election.
Source: Elections BC

2024 British Columbia general election
Party	Candidate	Votes	%	±%	Expenditures
Conservative	Amelia Boultbee	11,615	41.37	–	$56,697.20
New Democratic	Tina Lee	11,298	40.24	+1.3	$30,293.77
Unaffiliated	Tracy St. Claire	2,720	9.69	–	$16,157.90
Green	Bradley Bartsch	1,472	5.24	-6.4	$2,072.42
Independent	Roger Harrington	827	2.95	–	$0.00
Independent	Anna Paddon	144	0.51	–	$617.10
Total valid votes/expense limit		28,076	99.90	–	$71,700.08
Total rejected ballots		29	0.10	–	
Turnout		28,105	61.49	–	
Registered voters		45,707			
Conservative notional gain from BC United		Swing		N/A (Note: Swing cannot be calculated as BC United did not run a candidate in this riding.)	
Source: Elections BC

2020 provincial election redistributed results
Party	%
Liberal	47.0
New Democratic	38.9
Green	11.6

=== Penticton ===
2020 British Columbia general election: Penticton
Party	Candidate	Votes	%	±%	Expenditures
Liberal	Dan Ashton	13,217	48.19	−5.36	$34,620.10
New Democratic	Toni Boot	10,343	37.71	+9.70	$11,650.73
Green	Ted Shumaker	3,152	11.49	−6.95	$19.00
Libertarian	Keith Macintyre	717	2.61	–	$605.44
Total valid votes		27,429	100.00	–	
Total rejected ballots					
Turnout					
Registered voters					
Source: Elections BC

2017 British Columbia general election: Penticton
Party	Candidate	Votes	%	±%	Expenditures
Liberal	Dan Ashton	14,470	52.80	+6.95	$48,359
New Democratic	Tarik Sayeed	7,874	28.73	−11.62	$50,324
Green	Connie Sahlmark	5,061	18.47	–	$4,596
Total valid votes		27,405	100.00		
Total rejected ballots		103	0.38		
Turnout		27,508	60.79		
Source: Elections BC

2013 British Columbia general election: Penticton
Party	Candidate	Votes	%	±%	Expenditures
Liberal	Dan Ashton	11,536	45.85	+1.86	$92,981
New Democratic	Richard Cannings	10,154	40.35	+9.20	$79,882
Conservative	Sean Upshaw	2,288	9.09	+0.35	$5,077
BC First	Doug Maxwell	1,185	4.71	–	$5,228
Total valid votes		25,163	100.00		
Total rejected ballots		173	0.68		
Turnout		25,336	58.27		
Source: Elections BC

B.C. General Election 2009 - Penticton
Party	Candidate	Votes	%	±	Expenditures
Liberal	Bill Barisoff	10,346	43.96	–	$97,580
New Democratic	Cameron Phillips	7,331	31.15	–	$30,828
Green	Julius Bloomfield	3,685	15.66	–	$37,129
Conservative	Chris Delaney	2,095	8.90	–	$16,210
Refederation	Wendy Dion	78	0.33	–	$730
Total valid votes		23,535	100		
Total rejected ballots		114	0.48		
Turnout		23,649	56.16		

=== Penticton-Okanagan Valley ===
B.C. General Election 2005 Penticton-Okanagan Valley
Party	Candidate	Votes	%	±	Expenditures
Liberal	Bill Barisoff	13,650	50.23%		$127,216
NDP	Garry Litke	10,197	37.52%		$33,019
Green	James Patrick Cunningham	2,669	9.82%	–	$467
Independent	Jane Turnell	660	2.43%		$282
Total valid votes		27,176	100%		
Total rejected ballots		142	0.52%		
Turnout		27,318	62.61%		

B.C. General Election 2001: Penticton-Okanagan Valley
Party	Candidate	Votes	%	±	Expenditures
Liberal	Bill Barisoff	15,609	62.73%	$46,209	
NDP	Naga Terada	3,887	15.62%	$8,128	
Green	Harry Naegel	3,524	14.16%	$358	
Marijuana	Riley Goldstone	786	3.16%	$386	
Unity	Walter Ozero	553	2.23%	$1,197	
Citizens Alliance Now	Kal Gidda	522	2.10%	$8,682	
Total valid votes		24,881	100.00%		
Total rejected ballots		73	0.29%		
Turnout		24,954	68.15%		

== See also ==
- List of British Columbia provincial electoral districts
- Canadian provincial electoral districts

Legislative Assembly of British Columbia
Preceded by Maple Ridge-Pitt Meadows	Constituency represented by the speaker 2005–2013	Succeeded by Richmond East
