= Similkameen—South Okanagan—West Kootenay =

Federal electoral district in British Columbia, Canada

British Columbia electoral district
- Interactive map of riding boundaries from the 2025 federal election

Federal electoral district
- Legislature: House of Commons
MP
Helena Konanz
Conservative
- District created: 2013
- First contested: 2015
- Last contested: 2025
- District webpage: profile, map

Demographics
- Population (2011): 112,096
- Electors (2011): 88,519
- Area (km²): 18,139
- Pop. density (per km²): 6.2
- Census division(s): Central Kootenay, Kootenay Boundary, Okanagan-Similkameen
- Census subdivision(s): Penticton, Castlegar, Osoyoos, Oliver, Rossland, Grand Forks, Princeton, Penticton, Warfield, Keremeos

Similkameen—South Okanagan—West Kootenay (French: Similkameen–Okanagan-Sud–Kootenay-Ouest; formerly South Okanagan—West Kootenay) is a federal electoral district in British Columbia. It encompasses a portion of British Columbia previously included in the electoral districts of British Columbia Southern Interior (58%), Kootenay—Columbia (3%), and Okanagan—Coquihalla (39%).

South Okanagan—West Kootenay was created by the 2012 federal electoral boundaries redistribution and was legally defined in the 2013 representation order. It came into effect upon the call of the 42nd Canadian federal election, scheduled for October 2015.

Under the 2022 Canadian federal electoral redistribution the riding was renamed. The riding gained Keremeos and Princeton, the Indian Reserves of Alexis 9, Ashnola 10, Blind Creek 6, Chopaka 7 & 8, Chuchuwayha 2 and Lower Similkameen 2 and the regional district electoral areas of Okanagan-Similkameen B, Okanagan-Similkameen G, Okanagan-Similkameen H, and the remainder of Okanagan-Similkameen I from Central Okanagan—Similkameen—Nicola. It lost the northern half of the Kootenay Boundary E / West Boundary regional district electoral area to Kelowna. It lost Fruitvale, Montrose, Trail, the regional district electoral area of Kootenay Boundary A and that part of Kootenay Boundary B / Lower Columbia-Old-Glory southeast of Trail to Columbia—Kootenay—Southern Rockies. It also lost the regional district electoral area of Central Kootenay H and the remainder of Central Kootenay K, plus Nakusp, New Denver, Silverton and Slocan which moved to Vernon—Lake Country—Monashee.

== Demographics ==
Panethnic groups in South Okanagan—West Kootenay (2011−2021)
Panethnic group	2021		2016		2011	
Panethnic group	Pop.	%	Pop.	%	Pop.	%
European (Note: Statistic includes all persons that did not make up part of a visible minority or an indigenous identity.)	103,605	86%	97,630	87.45%	98,150	89.87%
Indigenous	8,295	6.89%	7,635	6.84%	6,175	5.65%
South Asian	3,640	3.02%	2,850	2.55%	2,420	2.22%
East Asian (Note: Statistic includes total responses of "Chinese", "Korean", and "Japanese" under visible minority section on census.)	1,640	1.36%	1,385	1.24%	1,045	0.96%
Southeast Asian (Note: Statistic includes total responses of "Filipino" and "Southeast Asian" under visible minority section on census.)	1,375	1.14%	1,015	0.91%	620	0.57%
Latin American	665	0.55%	310	0.28%	195	0.18%
African	660	0.55%	470	0.42%	400	0.37%
Middle Eastern (Note: Statistic includes total responses of "West Asian" and "Arab" under visible minority section on census.)	185	0.15%	80	0.07%	95	0.09%
Other (Note: Statistic includes total responses of "Visible minority, n.i.e." and "Multiple visible minorities" under visible minority section on census.)	405	0.34%	270	0.24%	135	0.12%
Total responses	120,470	97.56%	111,640	97.34%	109,215	97.43%
Total population	123,487	100%	114,695	100%	112,096	100%
Notes: Totals greater than 100% due to multiple origin responses. Demographics based on 2012 Canadian federal electoral redistribution riding boundaries.

== Members of Parliament ==
This riding has elected the following members of the House of Commons of Canada:

Parliament	Years	Member	Party
South Okanagan—West Kootenay; Riding created from British Columbia Southern Interior, Kootenay—Columbia and Okanagan—Coquihalla
42nd	2015–2019	Richard Cannings	New Democratic
43rd	2019–2021	Richard Cannings	New Democratic
44th	2021–2025	Richard Cannings	New Democratic
Similkameen—South Okanagan—West Kootenay
45th	2025–present	Helena Konanz	Conservative

== Election results ==
Graph of election results in South Okanagan—West Kootenay (minor parties that never got 2% of the vote or didn't run consistently are omitted)

=== Similkameen—South Okanagan—West Kootenay, 2023 representation order ===
2025 Canadian federal election
** Preliminary results — Not yet official **
Party	Candidate	Votes	%	±%	Expenditures
Conservative	Helena Konanz	30,073	44.08	+6.50	
Liberal	Gloria Morgan	25,390	37.22	+23.99	
New Democratic	Linda Sankey	11,033	16.17	–22.80	
Green	Philip Mansfield	1,065	1.56	–1.79	
People's	Barry Dewar	660	0.97	–5.90	
Total valid votes/expense limit					
Total rejected ballots					
Turnout		68,221	71.61		
Eligible voters		95,268			
Conservative notional gain from New Democratic		Swing		–8.75	
Source: Elections Canada

2021 federal election redistributed results
Party	Vote	%
New Democratic	23,545	38.97
Conservative	22,704	37.58
Liberal	7,993	13.23
People's	4,151	6.87
Green	2,024	3.35

=== South Okanagan—West Kootenay, 2013 representation order ===
2021 Canadian federal election: South Okanagan—West Kootenay
Party	Candidate	Votes	%	±%	Expenditures
New Democratic	Richard Cannings	27,595	41.3	+4.9	$90,281.81
Conservative	Helena Konanz	23,675	35.5	+0.3	$133,978.75
Liberal	Ken Robertson	8,159	12.2	-5.0	$29,578.37
People's	Sean Taylor	4,866	7.3	+4.9	none listed
Green	Tara Howse	2,485	3.7	-4.6	$7,900.41
Total valid votes/expense limit		66,780	99.4	–	$137,054.79
Total rejected ballots		434	0.6		
Turnout		67,214	65.6		
Eligible voters		102,433			
New Democratic hold		Swing		+2.3	
Source: Elections Canada

2019 Canadian federal election: South Okanagan—West Kootenay
Party	Candidate	Votes	%	±%	Expenditures
New Democratic	Richard Cannings	24,809	36.4	-0.88	$121,393.67
Conservative	Helena Konanz	24,053	35.2	+5.36	none listed
Liberal	Connie Denesiuk	11,705	17.2	-10.93	$60,410.04
Green	Tara-Lyn Howse	5,672	8.3	+4.11	$10,551.96
People's	Sean Taylor	1,638	2.4		$6,237.32
Independent	Carolina Marie Hopkins	359	0.2		$77.17
Total valid votes/expense limit		68,196	100.0		
Total rejected ballots		381			
Turnout		68,577	69.56		
Eligible voters		98,589			
New Democratic hold		Swing		-3.12	
Source: Elections Canada

2015 Canadian federal election: South Okanagan—West Kootenay
Party	Candidate	Votes	%	±%	Expenditures
New Democratic	Richard Cannings	24,823	37.28	-2.16	$120,417.22
Conservative	Marshall Neufeld	19,871	29.84	-14.93	$156,966.44
Liberal	Connie Denesiuk	18,732	28.13	+21.03	$26,034.25
Green	Samantha Troy	2,792	4.19	-3.94	$153.48
Independent	Brian Gray	376	0.56	–	$115.36
Total valid votes/expense limit		66,594	100.00		$247,730.42
Total rejected ballots		216	0.32	–	
Turnout		66,810	73.67	–	
Eligible voters		90,694			
New Democratic notional gain from Conservative		Swing		+6.39	
Source: Elections Canada

2011 federal election redistributed results
Party	Vote	%
Conservative	24,846	44.77
New Democratic	21,886	39.44
Green	4,512	8.13
Liberal	3,942	7.10
Others	308	0.56

== See also ==
- List of Canadian electoral districts
- Historical federal electoral districts of Canada
