= Queen's School of Medicine =

Medical school of Queen's University at Kingston, Ontario, Canada

School of Medicine
- Type: Medical school
- Established: 1854; 172 years ago
- Parent institution: Queen's University Faculty of Health Sciences
- Director: Lisa Tannock
- Location: Kingston, Ontario, Canada; 44°13′23″N 76°29′26″W Location of the decanal office
- Website: meds.queensu.ca

The Queen's School of Medicine is a unit of the Faculty of Health Sciences at Queen's University at Kingston responsible for research, as well as undergraduate and graduate education in Medicine.

The educational program leading to the MD degree is central to the purpose of the faculty. It must meet all the requirements for accreditation and prepare graduates for postgraduate training leading to licensure and certification by the Ontario College of Family Physicians or the Royal College of Physicians and Surgeons.

Each year, over 5,000 students apply and 100 are admitted into the first year medicine program. Candidates are selected based on their MCAT performance, GPA, autobiographical sketch, and interview.

== History ==
The School of Medicine was founded in 1854. The original class had twenty-three students enrolled, taught by six lecturers in rented space on the second floor of 75 Princess Street in downtown Kingston.
