= Hal Berman =

Canadian physician and advocate against antisemitism in medicine (1968/1969)

- Born: Hal David Berman; 1968 or 1969 (age 57–58)
- Other name: Hershl Berman
- Education: Queen's University at Kingston (MD)
- Occupation: Palliative care physician
- Known for: Advocacy concerning antisemitism in medicine

Hal David Berman, who also uses the name Hershl Berman, is a Canadian physician specializing in internal medicine and palliative medicine. He has attracted public attention for his advocacy concerning alleged antisemitism within the medical profession and for disputes arising from physicians' responses to the Gaza war. In 2026, his social-media activity became an issue during his unsuccessful campaign for the presidency of the Ontario Medical Association (OMA).

Berman has practised at Sinai Health and held hospital privileges at sites operated by the University Health Network. He was also a New Democratic Party candidate in three federal elections and one Ontario provincial election.

== Medical career ==
Berman graduated from the medical school at Queen's University in 1998. He was certified in internal medicine by the Royal College of Physicians and Surgeons of Canada in 2002.

Berman has practised palliative medicine at Sinai Health's Temmy Latner Centre for Palliative Care. He has held hospital privileges at Sinai Health, the Princess Margaret Cancer Centre, Toronto General Hospital and Toronto Western Hospital. He has also served as chair of District 11 of the Ontario Medical Association.

== Advocacy and controversies ==
Following the 2023 Hamas-led attack on Israel and the ensuing Gaza war, Berman became an outspoken commentator on Israel and alleged antisemitism within medicine. His social-media posts included criticism of pro-Palestinian activists and physicians whom he believed had promoted antisemitic views.

In June 2024, Berman reposted a message by his Sinai Health colleague Kavita Algu concerning the University of Toronto's investments and described her as part of a "loud racist minority". Algu complained that the post violated Sinai Health's respectful-workplace policy and created an unsafe professional environment. An external investigation commissioned by Sinai Health concluded that Berman's social-media posts did not constitute workplace conduct because they were unrelated to the hospital. Berman declined to comment to the Toronto Star about the dispute.

The controversy resurfaced during the OMA's 2026 election for president-elect, the position through which the successful candidate would subsequently become president. Berman was one of five candidates. More than 150 physicians signed a letter expressing concern about his online conduct. The OMA commissioned an external review of the candidates' social-media activity. The association reported that the review found no eligibility or legal grounds to exclude Berman, though they characterized some of his posts as using a confrontational and combative tone.

A notice concerning the social-media review was added to Berman's candidate profile. Berman alleged that he was the only candidate singled out in this way and that the notice unfairly portrayed his advocacy against antisemitism as combative. He asked the OMA to remove it and later said that he believed he had been treated differently because he was Jewish. The OMA said that its screening process considered conduct that could affect a candidate's eligibility to hold office rather than candidates' personal opinions.

OMA board members Paul Conte and Paul Hacker resigned amid disagreement over the election process. Hacker said that he objected to the publication of third-party commentary about a candidate's tone or style as part of the formal election materials. The OMA described the resignations as personal decisions and said that the board retained a quorum.

Berman finished second to Haroon Yousuf, receiving 1,369 votes in the fourth count of the preferential ballot.

== Political activity ==
Berman describes himself as a socialist and says he was influenced by his maternal grandparents who were members of the General Jewish Labour Bund in Eastern Europe.

Berman has said that he became politically active in the early 1980s. He was a New Democratic Party candidate in three federal elections. He ran in York Centre in the 2015 Canadian federal election, receiving 3,148 votes, or 7.3 per cent.

He contested Markham—Stouffville in the 2019 Canadian federal election, receiving 4,132 votes, or 6.4 per cent, and ran in Willowdale in the 2021 Canadian federal election, receiving 4,231 votes, or 10.3 per cent. He placed third in each election.

Berman subsequently represented the Ontario New Democratic Party in the provincial Willowdale riding in the 2022 Ontario general election. He received 3,253 votes, or 10.3 per cent, and placed third.

In July 2026, Berman wrote that he was ending his support for the federal NDP, with which he said he had been associated for more than 40 years. He attributed his decision to what he regarded as the party's failure to respond adequately to antisemitism. Berman said that he hoped to remain associated with the Ontario NDP if membership in the federal and provincial parties could be separated.
