= Markham—Stouffville (federal electoral district) =

Federal electoral district in Ontario, Canada

Coordinates: 43.977°N 79.273°W

Ontario electoral district
- Interactive map of riding boundaries from the 2025 federal election

Federal electoral district
- Legislature: House of Commons
MP
Helena Jaczek
Liberal
- District created: 2013
- First contested: 2015
- Last contested: 2025
- District webpage: profile, map

Demographics
- Population (2021): 135,944
- Electors (2021): 96,687
- Area (km²): 299
- Pop. density (per km²): 454.7
- Census division: Regional Municipality of York
- Census subdivision(s): Markham (part), Whitchurch–Stouffville (part)

Markham—Stouffville is a federal electoral district in Ontario, Canada.

Markham—Stouffville was created by the 2012 federal electoral boundaries redistribution out of parts of of Markham—Unionville and Oak Ridges—Markham. It was legally defined in the 2013 representation order, and came into effect upon the dropping of the writs for the 2015 federal election. Helena Jaczek has represented the riding since the 2019 federal election.

Following the 2022 Canadian federal electoral redistribution, it gained that part of Markham—Unionville south of Bur Oak Avenue and east of McCowan Road, and lost all of its territory south of the 407 to Markham—Thornhill, and all of its territory north and west of Stouffville to York—Durham.

== Geography ==
The territory of the riding consists of part of the Town of Whitchurch-Stouffville and part of the City of Markham. As of the 2021 census, the riding's population is 135,944.

== Demographics ==
According to the 2021 Canadian census, 2023 representation order

Racial groups: 33.2% White, 32.9% Chinese, 16.5% South Asian, 3.8% Black, 3.8% Filipino, 1.2% Arab, 1.1% West Asian
Languages: 55.2% English, 15.3% Cantonese, 8.4% Mandarin, 4.1% Tamil, 1.4% Italian, 1.3% Urdu, 1.4% Tagalog, 1.3% French
Religions: 46.9% Christian (22.4% Catholic, 4.2% Christian Orthodox, 2.5% Anglican, 1.9% United Church, 1.3% Baptist, 14.6% Other), 8.8% Hindu, 5.9% Muslim, 2.7% Buddhist, 34.2% None
Median income: $42,400 (2020)
Average income: $57,700 (2020)

== Riding associations ==
Riding associations are the local branches of the national political parties:

Party	Association name	CEO	HQ city
Conservative Party of Canada	Markham—Stouffville Conservative Association	Jeyaprakash N. Kirthiraj	Whitchurch-Stouffville
Green Party of Canada	Markham—Stouffville Green Party Association	Mary-Louise A. Prosen	Markham
Liberal Party of Canada	Markham—Stouffville Federal Liberal Association	Catherine E. Harris	Markham
New Democratic Party	Markham—Stouffville Federal NDP Riding Association	Jessica Pointon	Ottawa

== Members of Parliament ==
This riding has elected the following members of Parliament:

Parliament	Years	Member	Party
Markham—Stouffville; Riding created from Markham—Unionville and Oak Ridges—Markham
42nd	2015–2019	Jane Philpott	Liberal
42nd	2019–2019	Jane Philpott	Independent
43rd	2019–2021	Helena Jaczek	Liberal
44th	2021–2025	Helena Jaczek	Liberal
45th	2025–present	Helena Jaczek	Liberal

== Election results ==
View source data.
Graph of general election results in Markham—Stouffville (parties that never received 2% of the vote are omitted)

2025 Canadian federal election
Party	Candidate	Votes	%	±%
Liberal	Helena Jaczek	31,658	51.36	–0.19
Conservative	Niran Jeyanesan	27,898	45.26	+10.50
New Democratic	Serena Cheung	1,121	1.82	–6.97
Green	Myles O'Brien	433	0.70	–1.27
People's	René de Vries	393	0.64	–2.30
Centrist	Shahzad Ahmed	141	0.23	N/A
Total valid votes		61,644	99.46	
Total rejected ballots		334	0.54	-0.29
Turnout		61,978	69.23	+9.84
Eligible voters		89,529		
Liberal notional hold		Swing		–5.35
Source: Elections Canada

2021 federal election redistributed results
Party	Vote	%
Liberal	25,391	51.55
Conservative	17,118	34.75
New Democratic	4,329	8.79
People's	1,448	2.94
Green	972	1.97
Total valid votes	49,258	99.17
Rejected ballots	412	0.83
Registered voters/ estimated turnout	83,633	59.39

2021 Canadian federal election
Party	Candidate	Votes	%	±%	Expenditures
Liberal	Helena Jaczek	29,773	50.99	+12.11	$102,548.63
Conservative	Ben Smith	20,740	35.52	+4.78	$105,317.55
New Democratic	Muhammad Ahsin Sahi	4,961	8.50	+2.19	$2,935.24
People's	René De Vries	1,869	3.20	+2.37	$4,030.60
Green	Uzair Baig	1,049	1.80	-0.69	$3,158.35
Total valid votes/expense limit		58,392	–	–	$124,038.54
Total rejected ballots		459			
Turnout		58,851	60.78	-7.78	
Eligible voters		96,829			
Liberal hold		Swing		+3.67	
Source: Elections Canada

2019 Canadian federal election
Party	Candidate	Votes	%	±%	Expenditures
Liberal	Helena Jaczek	24,743	38.88	-10.33	$101,615.44
Conservative	Theodore Antony	19,570	30.74	-12.03	$80,408.76
Independent	Jane Philpott	13,216	20.76		$101,260.04
New Democratic	Hal Berman	4,013	6.30	+0.2	none listed
Green	Roy Long	1,581	2.48	+0.56	$5,982.06
People's	Jeremy Lin	531	0.83		$1,962.39
Total valid votes/expense limit		63,654	100.0		
Total rejected ballots					
Turnout					
Eligible voters					
Liberal hold		Swing		+0.85	
Sources: CBC News, Elections Canada

2015 Canadian federal election
Party	Candidate	Votes	%	±%	Expenditures
Liberal	Jane Philpott	29,416	49.21	+20.26	$112,011.35
Conservative	Paul Calandra	25,565	42.77	-7.72	$164,609.85
New Democratic	Gregory Hines	3,647	6.10	-10.88	$7,176.28
Green	Myles O'Brien	1,145	1.92	-0.81	$1,395.62
Total valid votes/Expense limit		59,773	100.00		$225,802.37
Total rejected ballots		189	0.32		
Turnout		59,962	68.56		
Eligible voters		87,460			
Liberal notional gain from Conservative		Swing		+13.99	
Source: Elections Canada

2011 federal election redistributed results
Party	Vote	%
Conservative	23,820	50.49
Liberal	13,662	28.96
New Democratic	8,010	16.98
Green	1,284	2.72
Others	406	0.86
Total	47,182	100.00

== See also ==
- List of Canadian electoral districts
- Historical federal electoral districts of Canada
