= List of provincial parks of the Kootenays =

The list of provincial parks of the Kootenays contains the provincial parks located within this geographic region of the province of British Columbia. It includes parks from the three regional districts of East Kootenay, Central Kootenay and Kootenay Boundary. These parks are administered by BC Parks under the jurisdiction of the Ministry of Environment and Climate Change Strategy.

== List of parks ==
Park name	Regional districts	Coordinates	Size		Established	Remarks
Park name	Regional districts	Coordinates	ha	acres	Established	Remarks
Akamina-Kishinena Provincial Park	East Kootenay	49°01′30″N 114°12′00″W	10,921.5	26,988	1995	
Beaver Creek Provincial Park	Kootenay Boundary	49°04′00″N 117°36′00″W	81	200	1965	
Boundary Creek Provincial Park	Kootenay Boundary	49°04′00″N 118°42′00″W	2	4.9	1956	
Champion Lakes Provincial Park	Central Kootenay	49°11′05″N 117°37′26″W	1,452	3,590	1955	
Christina Lake Provincial Park	Kootenay Boundary	49°02′34″N 118°13′08″W	6	15	1971	
Cody Caves Provincial Park	Central Kootenay	49°44′00″N 116°57′00″W	63	160	1966	
Columbia Lake Provincial Park	East Kootenay	50°17′49″N 115°50′49″W	290	720	1988	
Conkle Lake Provincial Park	Kootenay Boundary	49°10′00″N 119°06′00″W	587	1,450	1973	
Crowsnest Provincial Park	East Kootenay	49°39′00″N 114°42′00″W	46	110	1960	
Drewry Point Provincial Park	Central Kootenay	49°25′00″N 116°49′01″W	24	59	1970	
Dry Gulch Provincial Park	East Kootenay	50°35′10″N 116°02′19″W	29	72	1956	
Elk Lakes Provincial Park	East Kootenay	50°28′55″N 115°05′14″W	17,245	42,610	1973	
Elk Valley Provincial Park	East Kootenay	49°37′25″N 114°56′17″W	78	190	1960	
Erie Creek Provincial Park	Central Kootenay	49°11′23″N 117°18′18″W	15	37	1965	
Gilnockie Provincial Park	East Kootenay	49°05′15″N 115°39′20″W	2,842.2	7,023	1995	
Gladstone Provincial Park	Kootenay Boundary	49°18′00″N 118°15′00″W	39,387	97,330	1995	
Goat Range Provincial Park	Central Kootenay	50°17′00″N 117°16′59″W	79,124	195,520	1995	
Granby Provincial Park	Kootenay Boundary	49°44′30″N 118°27′00″W	40,845	100,930	1995	
Grohman Narrows Provincial Park	Central Kootenay	49°29′45″N 117°20′40″W	10	25	1981	
Height of the Rockies Provincial Park	East Kootenay	50°30′00″N 115°15′00″W	54,170	133,900	1995	
James Chabot Provincial Park	East Kootenay	50°30′40″N 116°01′19″W	14	35	1979	
Jewel Lake Provincial Park	Kootenay Boundary	49°11′00″N 118°36′00″W	49	120	1981	
Jimsmith Lake Provincial Park	East Kootenay	49°28′58″N 115°50′28″W	13.7	34	1956	
Johnstone Creek Provincial Park	Kootenay Boundary	49°03′00″N 119°03′00″W	38	94	1956	
Kianuko Provincial Park	Central Kootenay	49°25′45″N 116°28′00″W	11,637.9	28,758	1995	
Kikomun Creek Provincial Park	East Kootenay	49°14′34″N 115°15′07″W	682	1,690	1972	
King George VI Provincial Park	Kootenay Boundary	49°01′00″N 117°49′01″W	161.88	400.0	1937	
Kokanee Creek Provincial Park	Central Kootenay	49°36′00″N 117°07′59″W	260	640	1955	
Kokanee Glacier Provincial Park	Central Kootenay	49°47′00″N 117°10′01″W	32,035	79,160	1922	
Kootenay Lake Provincial Park	Central Kootenay	49°22′23″N 116°48′37″W	343	850	1987	
Lockhart Beach Provincial Park	Central Kootenay	49°30′33″N 116°47′14″W	8	20	1933	
Lockhart Creek Provincial Park	Central Kootenay	49.50278°N 116.70972°W	3,734	9,230	1995	
McDonald Creek Provincial Park	Central Kootenay	50°08′38″N 117°48′25″W	468	1,160	1982	
Morrissey Provincial Park	East Kootenay	49°23′26″N 115°01′04″W	4.57	11.3	1962	
Mount Assiniboine Provincial Park	East Kootenay	50°50′00″N 115°34′59″W	39,013	96,400	1922	
Mount Fernie Provincial Park	East Kootenay	49°29′20″N 115°06′07″W	259	640	1959	
Moyie Lake Provincial Park	East Kootenay	49°22′19″N 115°50′20″W	90.5	224	1959	
Nancy Greene Provincial Park	Kootenay Boundary	49°15′00″N 117°55′59″W	203	500	1972	
Norbury Lake Provincial Park	East Kootenay	49°32′20″N 115°29′10″W	97	240	1958	
Pilot Bay Provincial Park	Central Kootenay	49°38′29″N 116°51′54″W	347	860	1964	
Premier Lake Provincial Park	East Kootenay	49°51′00″N 115°39′07″W	837	2,070	1940	
Purcell Wilderness Conservancy Provincial Park	Central Kootenay	50°09′00″N 116°31′59″W	202,095.6	499,389	1974	
Rosebery Provincial Park	Central Kootenay	50°02′08″N 117°24′15″W	32	79	1959	
Ryan Provincial Park	East Kootenay	49°08′10″N 116°01′55″W	58	140	1959	
St. Mary's Alpine Provincial Park	East Kootenay	49°52′50″N 116°21′00″W	9,146	22,600	1973	
Stagleap Provincial Park	Central Kootenay	49°03′37″N 117°02′56″W	1,133	2,800	1964	
Summit Lake Provincial Park	Central Kootenay	50°09′24″N 117°39′17″W	6	15	1964	
Syringa Provincial Park	Central Kootenay	49°21′13″N 117°53′35″W	4,499	11,120	1968	
Thunder Hill Provincial Park	East Kootenay	50°10′05″N 115°51′19″W	44	110	1960	
Top of the World Provincial Park	East Kootenay	49°50′49″N 115°26′31″W	8,790	21,700	1973	
Valhalla Provincial Park	Central Kootenay	49°53′00″N 117°34′30″W	50,060	123,700	1983	
Wardner Provincial Park	East Kootenay	49°25′01″N 115°25′18″W	4	9.9	1977	
Wasa Lake Provincial Park	East Kootenay	49°47′30″N 115°44′13″W	154	380	1955	
West Arm Provincial Park	Central Kootenay	49°30′15″N 117°08′00″W	26,199	64,740	1995	
Whiteswan Lake Provincial Park	East Kootenay	50°07′09″N 115°32′42″W	1,994	4,930	1978	
Windermere Lake Provincial Park	East Kootenay	50°25′44″N 115°58′16″W	220	540	1999	
Yahk Provincial Park	Central Kootenay	49°04′49″N 116°05′46″W	11	27	1956	

== Gallery ==
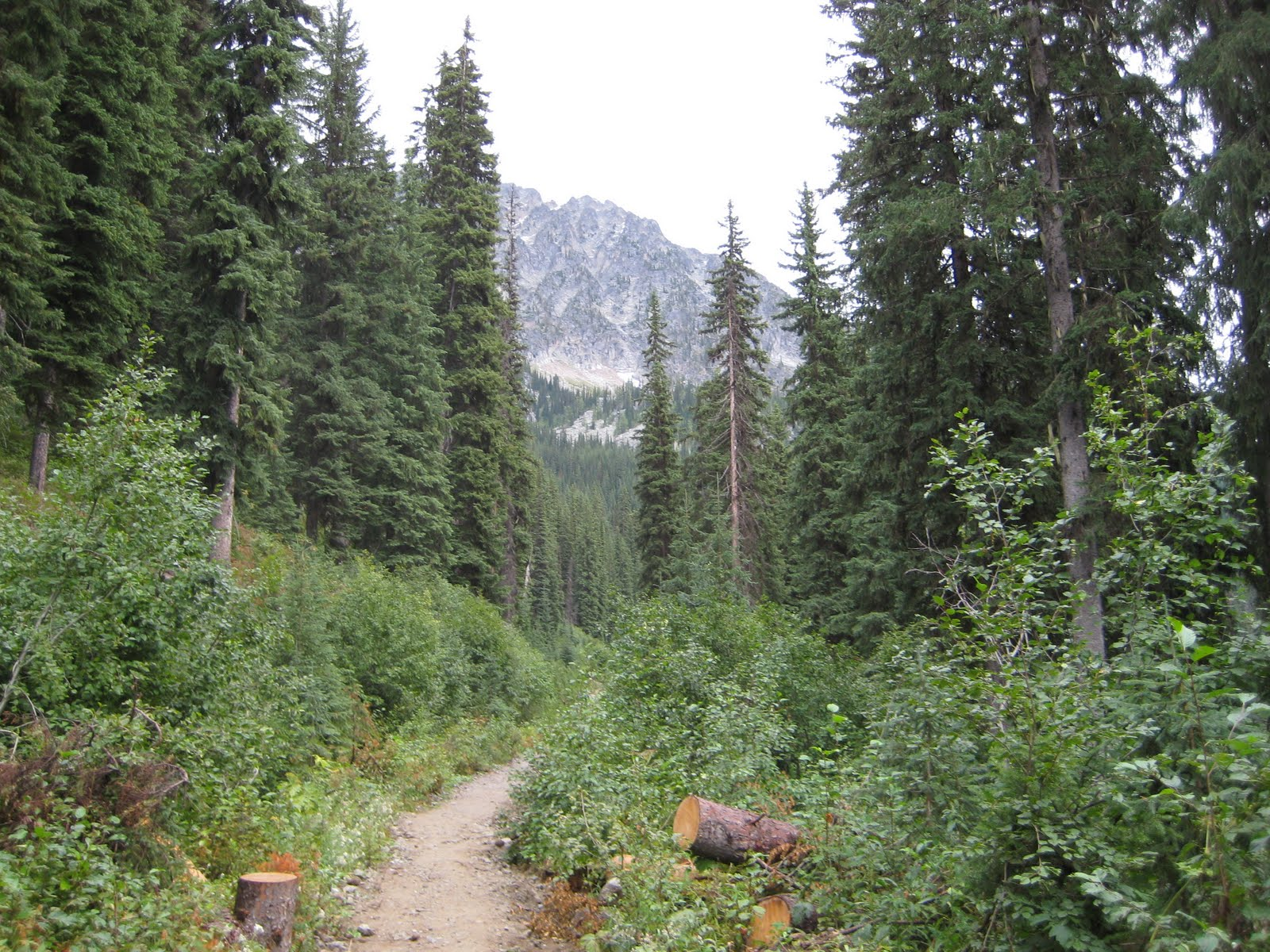
Kokanee Glacier Provincial Park

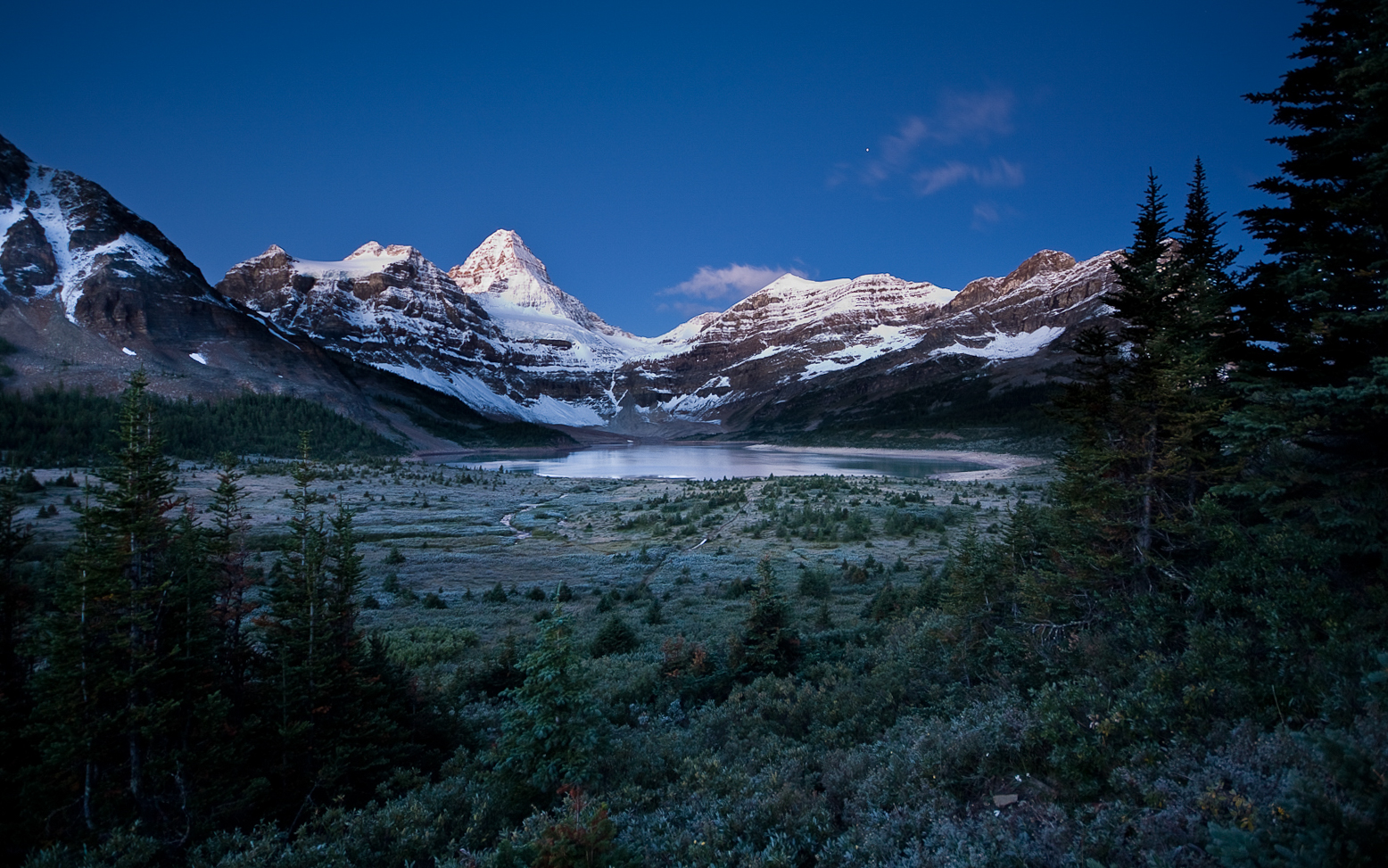
Mount Assiniboine Provincial Park

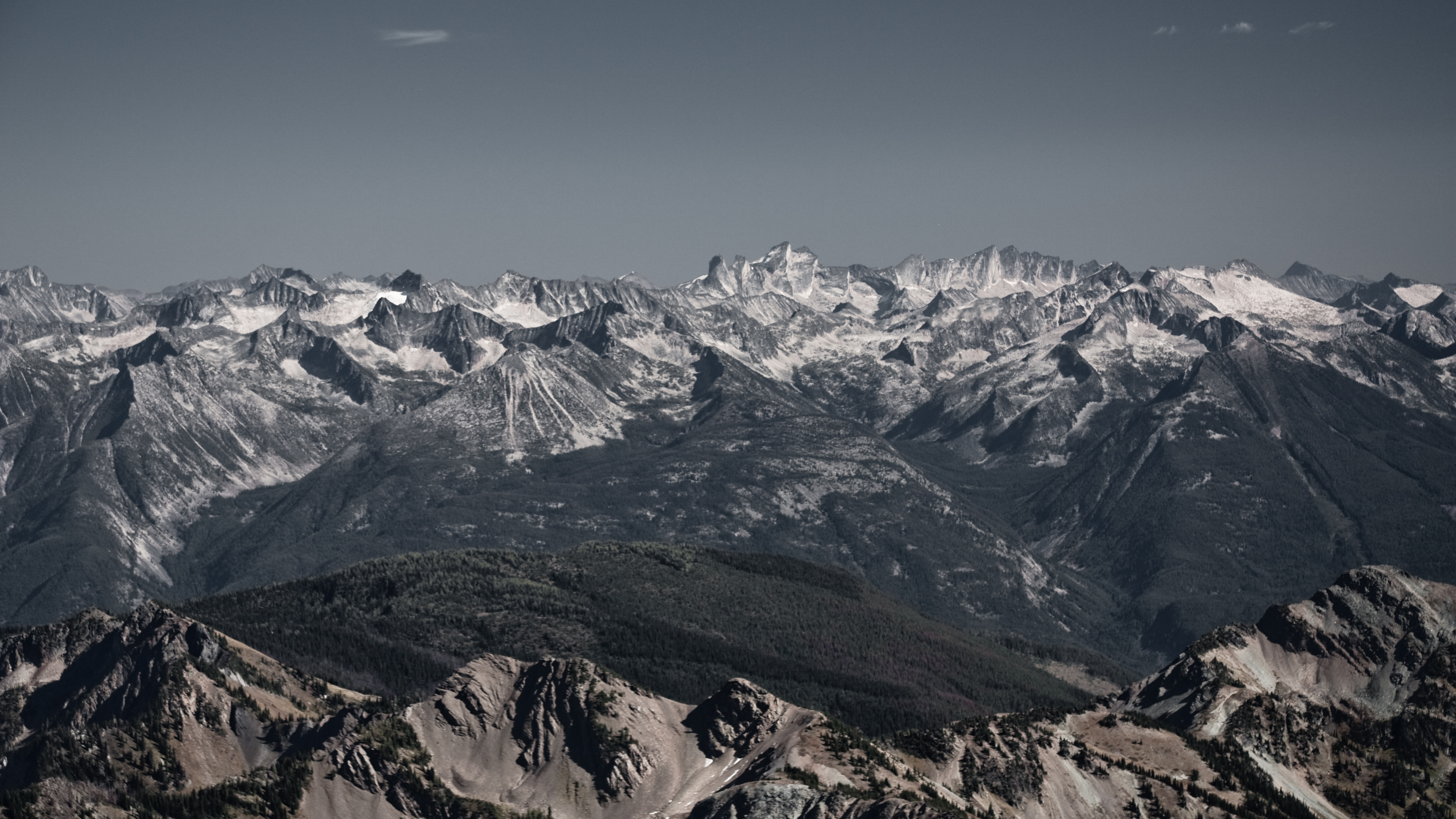
Purcell Wilderness Conservancy Provincial Park

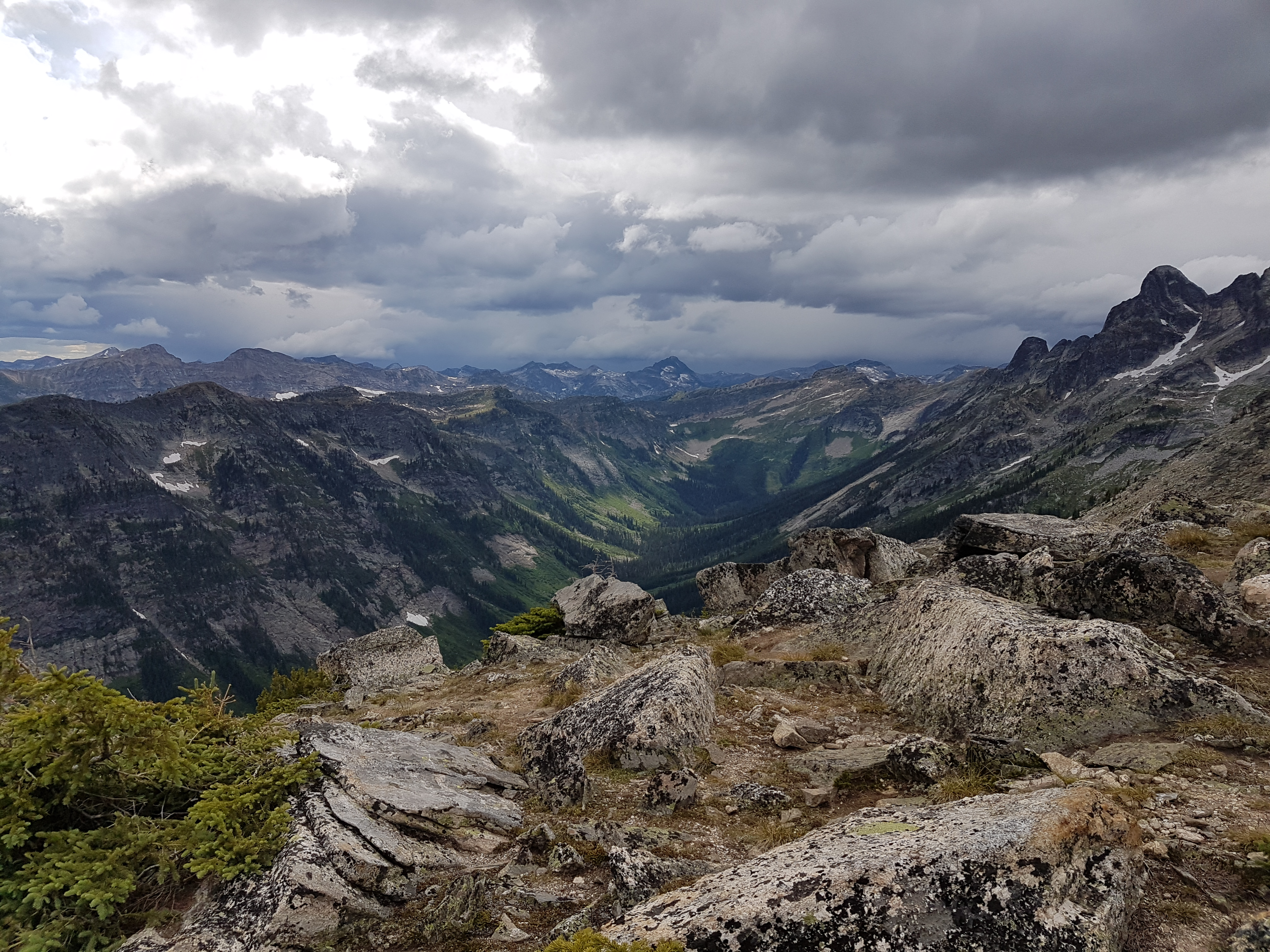
Valhalla Provincial Park
