= McDonald Creek =

McDonald Creek may refer to:

- McDonald Creek Provincial Park, a park in Canada
- McDonald Creek (Walker County, Texas), a stream in Texas, U.S.
- McDonald Creek (Salt Fork Brazos River tributary), a stream in Texas, U.S.
