= Christina Lake, British Columbia =

Christina Lake
- Unincorporated
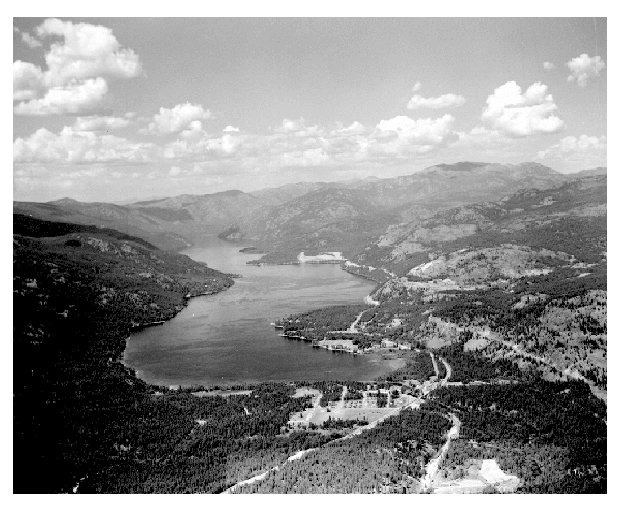
- Aerial of Christina Lake in 1947

- Location of Christina Lake in British Columbia
- Coordinates: 49°02′35″N 118°12′30″W
- Country: Canada
- Province: British Columbia
- Regional District: Kootenay Boundary

Area
  - Land: 10.72 km^{2} (4.14 sq mi)

Population (2016)
  - Total: 1,099
  - Density: 102.5/km^{2} (265/sq mi)
- Time zone: UTC−8 (PST)
  - Summer (DST): UTC−7 (PDT)
- Postal code span: V0H 1E0
- Area codes: 250, 778, 236

Christina Lake is an unincorporated recreational area in the Boundary Country of the West Kootenay region of British Columbia, Canada. It is located on Crowsnest Highway (British Columbia Highway 3), 20 kilometres (12 mi) east of Grand Forks and 73 kilometres (45 mi) southwest of Castlegar.

== History ==
Originally an important fishing ground to the Sinixt, Sanpoil, Okanagan and other tribes, pictographs can still be found around the north-east shore of Christina Lake.

The village and the lake were named after Christina McDonald, daughter of fur-trader Angus McDonald, who ran the Hudson's Bay Company trading post at Fort Colville from 1852 to 1871.

The arrival of the Canadian Pacific Railway in the late 1890s brought a number of townsites to the area around Christina Lake and it became a popular recreational area for visitors who came by rail from places like Grand Forks or Phoenix.

In the early 1900s there were summer cottages, fishing and other activities. When the Cascade-Rossland Highway was completed in 1922, more tourists visited the region. During Prohibition in the United States, many American visitors from north-east Washington made the trip across the border to enjoy the local saloons and dance halls.

During World War II, approximately 100 Japanese people were relocated in a summer resort hotel and its adjacent cabins, the Alpine Inn, on nearby English Point, where a school was established to teach Japanese and English. After the war and the restrictions were lifted, some of the families remained in the area.

Alpine Inn in 1950

== Present day ==
Since the years following World War II, Christina Lake has again become a recreation community. Christina Lake boasts the warmest water of any tree lined lake in Western Canada and is a summer time mecca for biking, kayaking, boating and water sports. Opened in 1963 and expanded in 1986, the Christina Lake Golf Course was built at the location of the old ghost town of Cascade City. The course was designed by golf course architect Les Furber and it is the first course in Canada to offer the rare feature of black sand traps.

The Trans Canada Trail and the historic Dewdney Trail and Kettle Valley Railroad Trail meet at Christina Lake, attracting bikers, hikers and tourists from around the world.

The summer of 2011 saw the opening of the Christina Living Arts Centre (now known simply as the Welcome Centre) designed by Studio 9 Architecture + Planning, which includes the town's visitor's centre as well as an art gallery. The centre was built to LEED standards. Accompanying the centre is the district's first Solar Aquatics water treatment facility.

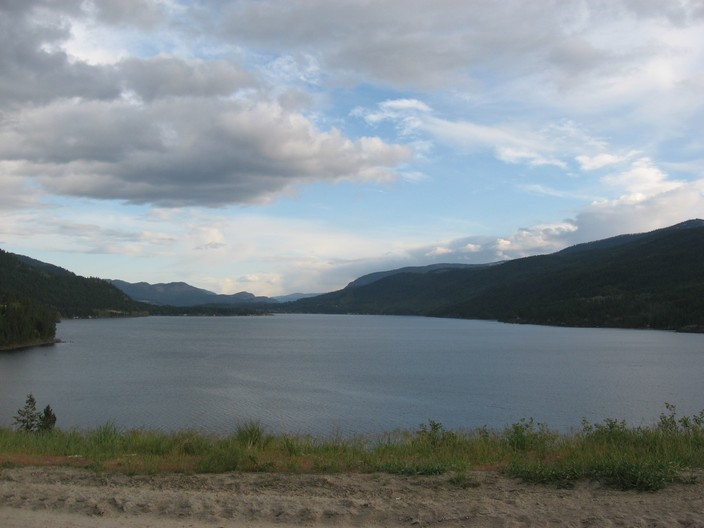
Cristina Lake

== Climate ==
Climate data for Billings, British Columbia (49°01'00.600" N, 118°13'42.000" W Elevation: 510.00 m) (1981-2010)
Month	Jan	Feb	Mar	Apr	May	Jun	Jul	Aug	Sep	Oct	Nov	Dec	Year
Record high °C (°F)	11.0 (51.8)	13.5 (56.3)	24.0 (75.2)	31.5 (88.7)	37.5 (99.5)	37.0 (98.6)	41.0 (105.8)	39.5 (103.1)	39.0 (102.2)	29.0 (84.2)	17.0 (62.6)	9.0 (48.2)	41.0 (105.8)
Mean daily maximum °C (°F)	−0.6 (30.9)	3.2 (37.8)	9.9 (49.8)	15.9 (60.6)	20.3 (68.5)	24.1 (75.4)	29.2 (84.6)	28.9 (84.0)	23.7 (74.7)	14.0 (57.2)	4.1 (39.4)	−1.0 (30.2)	14.3 (57.8)
Daily mean °C (°F)	−3.3 (26.1)	−0.8 (30.6)	4.3 (39.7)	9.1 (48.4)	13.2 (55.8)	16.8 (62.2)	20.9 (69.6)	20.4 (68.7)	15.8 (60.4)	8.2 (46.8)	1.2 (34.2)	−3.5 (25.7)	8.5 (47.4)
Mean daily minimum °C (°F)	−6.0 (21.2)	−4.8 (23.4)	−1.4 (29.5)	2.3 (36.1)	5.9 (42.6)	9.3 (48.7)	12.3 (54.1)	11.7 (53.1)	7.7 (45.9)	2.4 (36.3)	−1.8 (28.8)	−5.8 (21.6)	2.7 (36.8)
Record low °C (°F)	−27.0 (−16.6)	−26.5 (−15.7)	−16.0 (3.2)	−6.0 (21.2)	−3.0 (26.6)	1.5 (34.7)	5.5 (41.9)	3.5 (38.3)	−2.5 (27.5)	−11.0 (12.2)	−25.0 (−13.0)	−28.5 (−19.3)	−28.5 (−19.3)
Average precipitation mm (inches)	49.4 (1.94)	32.9 (1.30)	38.7 (1.52)	46.3 (1.82)	64.4 (2.54)	63.8 (2.51)	35.8 (1.41)	22.7 (0.89)	30.0 (1.18)	35.0 (1.38)	57.5 (2.26)	60.0 (2.36)	536.6 (21.13)
Average rainfall mm (inches)	11.4 (0.45)	13.9 (0.55)	30.0 (1.18)	46.3 (1.82)	64.4 (2.54)	63.8 (2.51)	35.8 (1.41)	22.7 (0.89)	30.0 (1.18)	34.2 (1.35)	33.8 (1.33)	15.1 (0.59)	401.4 (15.80)
Average snowfall cm (inches)	38 (15)	19 (7.5)	9 (3.5)	0 (0)	0 (0)	0 (0)	0 (0)	0 (0)	0 (0)	1 (0.4)	24 (9.4)	45 (18)	135 (53)
Average precipitation days (≥ 0.2 mm)	11.8	9.2	10.6	12.2	13.9	12.0	7.7	5.6	6.4	10.1	13.8	13.9	127.2
Average rainy days (≥ 0.2 mm)	3.2	4.5	8.6	12.2	13.9	12.0	7.7	5.6	6.4	10.1	8.7	3.8	96.6
Average snowy days (≥ 0.2 cm)	9.7	5.5	2.5	0.10	0.0	0.0	0.0	0.0	0.0	0.27	6.1	11.3	35.5

== Texas Point Campground and other public access points ==
There are four main public access points at Christina Lake.

Texas Point is a campground in Christina Lake with a widely known and popular beach that includes cliffs that many residents and tourists scale and jump from. Christina Lake Provincial Park is the most used provincial park and is often busy. It has a big beach at the south end of the lake, as well as volleyball nets and picnic tables. The community boat ramps are located at English Point near the marina and Texas Point near the provincial campground.

Another access point is at the Community Park and at the Living Arts Centre. The Living Arts Centre end has a beach beside the outflow of the lake and amid cottonwoods, and at the north end of the park, Sutherland Creek flows into the lake, with a sandy beach there as a result of the sand bar.

Kingsley Beach is a public access point at LaValley Point, used by many people who stay at the hotels along Kingsley Road. The old Christina Lake Hotel and Dance Pavilion used to be located here. There are also the Provincial Park Campsites. There are many other public access points around the lake.

== See also ==
- Christina Lake Provincial Park
