= Ootischenia =

Coordinates: 49.284883°N 117.631301°W

Ootischenia (/ˌuːtɪˈʃɛniə/) is south of Castlegar on the east side of the Columbia River in the West Kootenay region of southern British Columbia.

== Background ==
In 1895, Hiram Landis arrived to clear and farm land soon named Waterloo Landing. The landing was about 6 kilometres (4 mi) downstream from the confluence of the Kootenay and Columbia rivers. The name came from the Waterloo mine, which was in a group of claims about 4 kilometres (2.5 mi) from the landing on a ridge just north of Iron Creek (east of the present airport). In between were Monte Carlo, also named for a mine, and Montgomery, named for Robert Fowler Montgomery Horne-Payne, chair of company that owned the townsite. It is unclear if these three short-lived mining towns were distinct or largely the same place.

In 1908, a Doukhobour advance party arrived at West Waterloo, and Landis rowed them across the river to the east side. Settling at an abandoned former logging camp, the group logged and farmed. In due course, a ferry was constructed, and the Landis farm purchased. The original name of the colony was Dolina Uteshenya (долина утешения), meaning "Valley of Consolation" in Russian. However, being unsuitable for agriculture without extensive irrigation, Dolina Opustosheniye, meaning "valley of desolation", became the motto for some settlers. Numerous English transliterations have been used. Ootshenia is the known earliest in 1924. The BC government adopted Ootishenia in 1951, but changed to Ootischenia in 1959, the latter spelling first appearing in 1937.

Over time, the neighbourhood has spread northward. In 2006, the population was 856. Nowadays, the northern part includes the West Kootenay Regional Airport and Castlegar's two golf courses.

The song "Ootischenia" by The Be Good Tanyas on their album Hello Love is about singer Frazey Ford's childhood home in Ootischenia.
