= International (sternwheeler) =

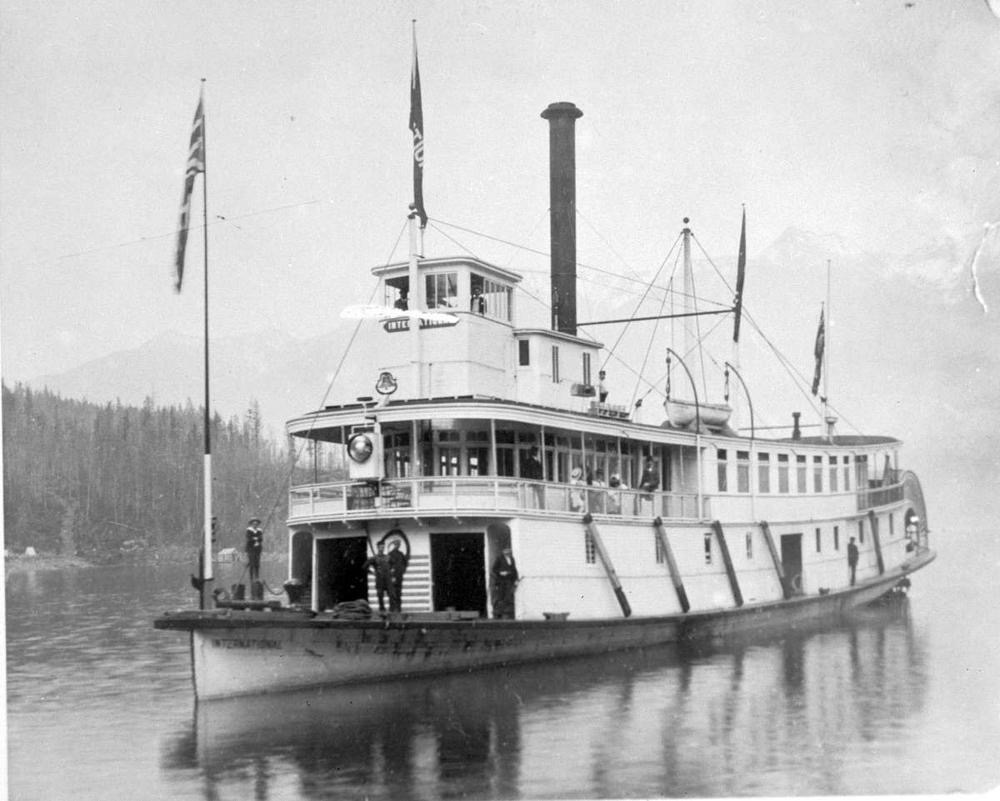
- International at Kaslo Bay.

History
- Name: International
- Owner: International Navigation & Trading Co.1896-1898; Kootenay Railway and Navigation Co.1898-1911
- Route: Kootenay Lake
- Builder: James Carson
- In service: 1896
- Out of service: 1908
- Identification: Canada 103489
- Fate: Taken out of service in 1908; sold for use as a floating hotel in 1912; lay derelict until 1952 when destroyed by fire.

General characteristics
- Type: Inland passenger/freighter
- Tonnage: 526 GT; 281 NT
- Length: 142 ft (43.28 m)
- Beam: 24.9 ft (7.59 m)
- Draft: 3.5 ft (1.07 m)
- Depth: 5.6 ft (1.71 m) depth of hold
- Installed power: twin high pressure steam engines, horizontally mounted: cylinder bore 16 in (41 cm); stroke 6 ft 6 in (198 cm)
- Propulsion: stern-wheel
- Speed: 15 miles (24 km) per hour (max)

International was a stern-wheel driven steam boat that operated on Kootenay Lake in British Columbia from 1896 to 1908. International was owned by a Canadian subsidiary of the Great Northern Railway and was involved in sharp competition, including steamboat racing, with similar vessels owned by the Canadian Pacific Railway.

== Construction ==
International was built at the Mirror Lake shipyard just south of Kaslo, British Columbia by James Carson for the International Navigation & Trading Company. The IN&T's rival, the Columbia and Kootenay Steam Navigation Company had launched the steamer Kokanee in April 1906 at Nelson, prompting IN&T to build International in response. The frames for International were pre-manufactured and shipped to Mirror Lake, where they arrived in April 1896, and construction began soon afterwards.

== Dimensions ==
International was 142 ft (43.28 m) long measured over the hull, and exclusive of the extension over the stern, called the fantail, on which the stern-wheel was mounted. The beam was 24.9 ft (7.59 m) and the vessel had a 5.6 ft (1.71 m) depth of hold. International drew 3.5 ft (1.07 m) feet of water.

The overall size of International was 526 gross tons and 281 net tons, with ton in this instance being a measure of volume and not of weight.

The Canadian merchant vessel registry number for International was 103489. International was licensed to carry 300 passengers.

== Engineering ==
International was propelled by a stern-wheel, which was turned by twin high pressure steam engines, horizontally mounted, each with a cylinder bore 16 in (41 cm) and a piston stroke of 6 ft 6 in (198 cm). The engines were manufactured by the Iowa Iron Works Co., of Dubuque, Iowa. The boiler was manufactured by John Inglis and Company, of Ottawa, Ontario.

== Career ==
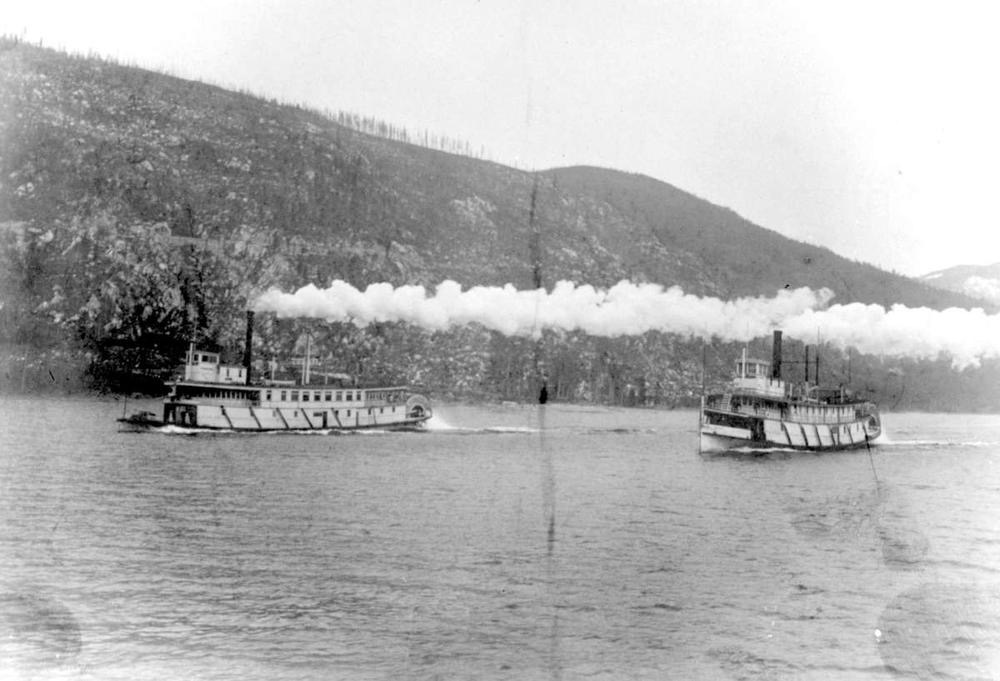
International (left) racing Kokanee (right)

International was launched in November 1896. Despite early expectations that International would be a “flyer,” the boat struggled to maintain a speed of 15 miles (24 km) per hour. Even so, International was raced against other steamers on the lake, and on December 12, 1896, was able to outrun Kokanee by two boat lengths. International was favored by the townspeople of Kaslo, while its rival Kokanee was popular in Nelson. Although International and Kokanee raced on at least two occasions, which of the two was the faster boat was never settled. International also raced against Moyie and Kuskanook

In February 1897, IN&T's time card for International showed a departure time from Kaslo bound for Nelson, at 5:30 a.m., stopping at Ainsworth, Pilot Bay, Balfour and way points. Returning, International departed Nelson at 4:40 p.m. Rail connections to Spokane and Northport, Washington, and Rossland, BC were made at Five Mile Point, near Nelson. The run between Kaslo and Nelson took about two hours.

From 1896 to 1901, International was placed on the route between Nelson, British Columbia and Kaslo. From 1902 to 1906, International was operated on the same run, but as a relief vessel for the newer steamer Kaslo.

In 1898, the Great Northern Railway organized a Canadian subsidiary, the Kootenay Railway and Navigation Company. KR&N took over the operations of IN&T, including the International. In 1906 International was rebuilt at the Mirror Lake shipyard.

From 1906 to 1908 International returned to the Kaslo-Nelson route, as the primary vessel.

== Disposition ==
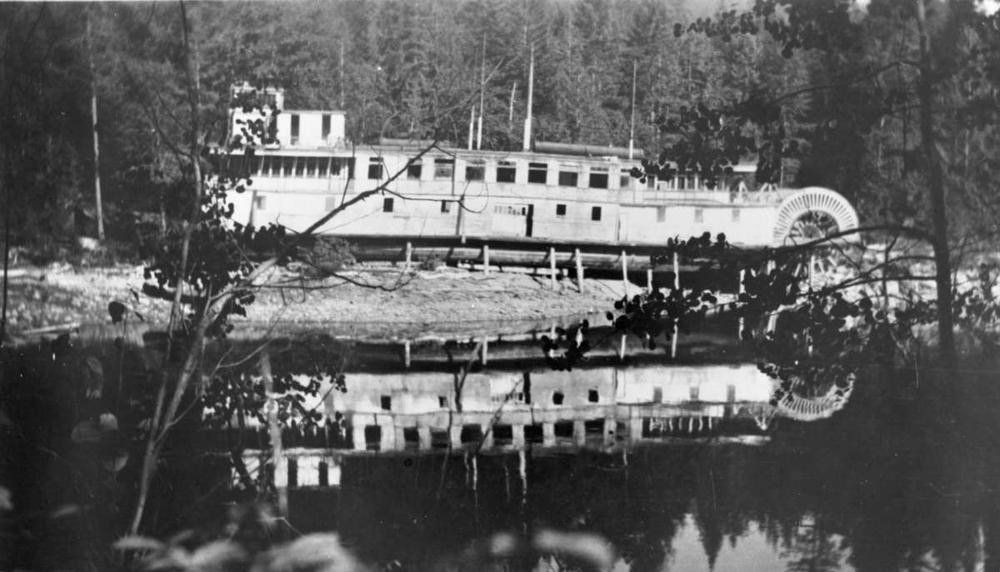
Hulk of International beached at Galena Bay

.

In the early 1900s, the Great Northern began to wind up its operations in the Kootenay region, and other than Kaslo, very little maintenance was done on its boats after 1906.

In 1909 International’s boiler failed. The boiler was removed in 1910. The new boiler was never delivered, and International was not returned to service. When KR&N ceased operations, International was taken to Mirror Lake and beached. In March 1912, International was sold to Gus Mathew for use as a tourist lodge at Riondel, British Columbia. International lay derelict at Riondel for many years. She was destroyed by fire in 1952.
