= Wardner =

Wardner may refer to:

== People ==
- Allen Wardner (1786–1877), American banker, businessman, and politician
- Rich Wardner (born 1942), American former politician
- Som Wardner, British singer and guitarist of band My Vitriol

== Places ==
- Wardner, British Columbia, Canada, a community
  - Wardner Provincial Park, a provincial park in British Columbia, Canada
- Wardner, Idaho, United States, a city

== Other uses ==
- Wardner (video game), a side-scrolling platform game

== See also ==
- Warner (disambiguation)
