= Stanley Humphries =

Stanley Humphries may refer to:

- Stanley H. Humphries (born 1969), American politician
- Stanley Humphries Secondary School, high school in Castlegar, British Columbia, Canada

== See also ==
- Stan Humphries (born 1965), American football player
