= Jewel Lake Provincial Park =

Provincial park in British Columbia, Canada

- IUCN category II (national park)
- Location within British Columbia
- Interactive map of Jewel Lake Provincial Park
- Location: Jewel Lake, British Columbia, Canada
- Nearest city: Greenwood, BC
- Coordinates: 49°10′55″N 118°36′12″W
- Area: 49 ha (120 acres)
- Established: October 22, 1981
- Governing body: BC Parks
- Website: bcparks.ca/jewel-lake-park/

Jewel Lake Provincial Park is a provincial park bordering the northwestern end of Jewel Lake in the Boundary region of south central British Columbia. The park, via BC Highway 3 and Jewel Lake Rd, is about 14 kilometres (8.7 mi) northeast of Greenwood and 48 kilometres (30 mi) northwest of Grand Forks

== Name origin ==
Long Lake, the original name, was first mentioned in 1895 regarding mining claims. In 1898, Randolph Stuart obtained a crown grant for land on the south and west sides of the lake. The next year, British aristocratic Arthur Norris Pelly bought some of this land, which he subdivided to create the Long Lake townsite, but the place amounted to little. Mount Pelly, east of the lake, bears his name. In the mid-1920s, Jewel Lake became the rename. The official adoption of this name occurred in the 1950s, as did the rename of Granite Creek to Jewel Creek.

== Physiography and aquatic life ==
The lake is about 3 kilometres (1.9 mi) long and 300 metres (330 yd) across. Stretching in a north-easterly direction, mountain ridges border the lake. The shoreline shallows drop off quickly to deep water, which is clear and of relatively good quality. Comfortable swimming temperatures exist by early July. Jewel Creek at the south end forms the outflow. The outlet provided sufficient spawning habitat to maintain fish stock. Historic claims of catching world record rainbow trout have lacked substantive proof.

== Recreational reserve at the north end ==
Established in 1949, and extended in 1971 to encompass 49 hectares (120 acres), the reserve comprised some old forest service toilets, tables and rock fire circles. May to June and the early fall months were the peak camping and fishing periods, inflicting a degree of damage upon the environment. A dual lane road provided paved access almost to the reserve, beyond which was a single lane gravel road.

== Earlier private development at the south end ==
By the 1970s, the south end of the lake was already privately developed, but a public boat launch existed. Jewel Lake Resorts Ltd. offered camping and day use facilities along with boat and cottage rentals. The only suitable swimming beaches on the lake were in private hands. Negotiations for a land exchange were conducted to provide beach access and a picnic area. The resort (essentially a fishing lodge), which was unable to satisfy camping and day use demands, welcomed the park creation. Due east was the Jewel Lake Gold Mines, which finally closed in the 1930s. Up the slope were collapsed buildings, rail lines, and mine shafts. Tailings piled near the shoreline would require removal to prevent polluting the lake, prior to replacing with clean sand to create a beach.

== Park creation proposal ==
Christina Lake is the nearest major lake in the region. By the 1970s, this lake was highly developed and intensively used for swimming, power boating and water skiing. Greenwood–Midway residents needed picnicking and swimming facilities within reasonable day use distance. Competing interests prevented an option to create a park enlarged beyond the reserve boundaries. To address environmental damage at the north end, there needed to be designated campsites, proper toilets, garbage facilities, tables, fireplaces, and improved vehicle access.

== Park profile ==
Established in 1981, the 49-hectare (120-acre) park comprises the same footprint as the prior reserve. The two-way road from 1.5 kilometres (0.9 mi) outside the entrance to within the park is gravel. Unrestricted public access is May–September. Quality Recreation Ltd is the private operator contracted to manage the amenity.

== Park facilities ==
The resort at the south end of the lake, operated by Jim Harrison, offers boat rentals, meals, and basic essentials. The park itself provides a traditional camping experience in a natural setting with 26 vehicle accessible campsites. A hand pump supplies water, which displays a permanent "boil water advisory" warning. Only pit toilets exist. For day users, a 15-vehicle parking lot serves a secluded beach, which has five picnic tables and two freestanding barbecues.

== Recreational activities ==
The Summerland Trout Hatchery stocks the lake with both brook trout and rainbow trout. Fly fishing is popular and in winter ice fishing is permitted. Canoeing and kayaking are common. Car-top boat-launching facilities are available. However, boats are restricted to 10 horsepower.
