= Kinnaird, British Columbia =

Coordinates: 49.283°N 117.650°W

Kinnaird (Scottish Gaelic: An Ceann Àrd, "high headland") is a neighbourhood comprising the southern part of Castlegar, British Columbia.

== Name origin ==
Formerly named West Waterloo, it was an original station on the Columbia and Western Railway opened in 1897. Called Kinnaird by 1912, a popular theory indicates this to be Arthur Kinnaird, 11th Lord Kinnaird, the first superstar of association football and President of the Football Association. This could align with a suggestion that a Canadian Pacific Railway (CP) official provided the name in honour of a place in Scotland.

An alternative theory proposes the name was that of an early settler, perhaps a variation of the person's actual name. One possibility is a CP employee with a name such as Kinney, whose yard bordered the railway siding, giving rise to a "Kinney yard" that developed into Kinnaird. Alfred Joseph Kinney and Frank Kinert were early CP employees listed in the Castegar directory. Furthermore, Kinert is a spelling variant of Kinnaird and the Kinert clan lived in the barony of Kinnaird. Being an obscure railway point at the time, no theory of the name origin appears more plausible than another.

== Community ==
By the 1940s, it was a bedroom community of both Trail and Castlegar. It was incorporated as a village on August 6, 1948, and town in 1967, amalgamating with the Town of Castlegar on January 1, 1974 to form the City of Castlegar.

It is the location of Kinnaird Elementary School, the community complex (home to the Castlegar Rebels of the KIJHL), and Kinnaird Park.

== Arms ==
Coat of arms of Kinnaird, British Columbia
Crest The Arms are ensigned by a mural crown Azure masoned Or; Escutcheon Gules a sunburst Or issuant from a base enarched dancetty Azure charged with two barrulets wavy, overall on a fess wavy Argent a maple leaf between two crescents Gules Motto HÆC LUMINA NUNQUAM ERRANTIA (Latin for 'These lights never wander')
