= Pilot Bay, British Columbia =

Pilot Bay
- Location of Pilot Bay in British Columbia
- Coordinates: 49°38′45″N 116°52′45″W
- Country: Canada
- Province: British Columbia
- Region: West Kootenay
- Regional district: Central Kootenay
- Area codes: 250, 778, 236, & 672

Pilot Bay is a on the east shore of Kootenay Lake in the West Kootenay region of southeastern British Columbia. The locality is about 6 kilometres (4 mi) south of Kootenay Bay on Pilot Bay Rd, immediately southwest of the entrance to Pilot Bay Provincial Park.

== Name origin ==
The name derived from the bay being the most protected on the lake. During bad weather a pilot would steer his ship to shelter in the harbour. The landing, known as Galena (after its supply vessel), was to be the name of the townsite surveyed in 1892, but that name had already been registered for a different location. A belief that the adopted name was a later corruption of a First Nations word that meant Pirates Bay is baseless, but outsiders used the expression as a derogatory nickname.

== Initial development ==
The Davies-Sayward Mill and Land Company operated a sawmill on a 300-acre site 1890–1903. The mill primarily supplied the Blue Bell lead-silver mine at Riondel. In 1884, Robert Evan (Bob) Sproule sold an interest in the mine to Dr. Wilbur A. Hendryx. On Sproule's 1887 hanging for murder, the mine ownership passed wholly to Hendryx's Kootenay Mining and Smelting Company (KM&S). After a further $100,000 investment in mine development, by 1890, the Galena transported the ore south for refining, returning north with coal to power the operation. With the water route often impassable during the year, the exercise proved uneconomical.

== Smelter & town ==
To increase the cargo value prior to shipment, a smelter was needed, and the flat ground at Pilot Bay was chosen. The 200-ton-per-day concentration plant erected, the first shipment of concentrate left in March 1894. Construction continued on an engine house and boiler room, roasting furnace buildings, machine and blacksmith shop, carpenters' shop, laboratory and assay office, and administration offices. Meanwhile, the adjacent town grew. By 1895 the Pilot Bay Smelter employed 200 men. The place had a population of 1,000 served by 4 hotels, 3 stores and other businesses.

However, the particular processing equipment proved incapable of handling the complicated composition of the ore. In September 1896, the works closed. The success of the Hall Mines Smelter opening in Nelson that year made upgrading the KM&S smelter futile. The Bank of Montreal, the main creditor, assumed ownership. A sub-lessee used the plant to reduce ore from the Lucky Jim and Tariff mines near Ainsworth. Despite the exodus of workers, the town survived until the sawmill closed in 1903. In 1905 the Canadian Metals Company (CMC), unsuccessfully attempted to renovate the concentrator to process the zinc-rich ore from local mines.

== Present location ==
West of the main road, the twin rectangular brick chimneys, some machinery parts, and a giant sawdust pile are all that remain. The former settlement is a ghost town. Several much later residences lie east of the road. A lighthouse, built in 1904 and operational until 1993, stands at the end of the point.
