= Erie Creek Provincial Park =

Provincial park in British Columbia, Canada

- IUCN category II (national park)
- Location within British Columbia
- Interactive map of Erie Creek Provincial Park
- Location: Kootenay Land District, British Columbia, Canada
- Nearest city: Castlegar, BC
- Coordinates: 49°11′22″N 117°18′18″W
- Area: 15 ha (37 acres)
- Established: August 11, 1965
- Governing body: BC Parks

Erie Creek Provincial Park is a provincial park in British Columbia, Canada, about 15 hectares in size. It is a protected area because of the wildlife it hosts.
