= J. Lloyd Crowe Secondary School =

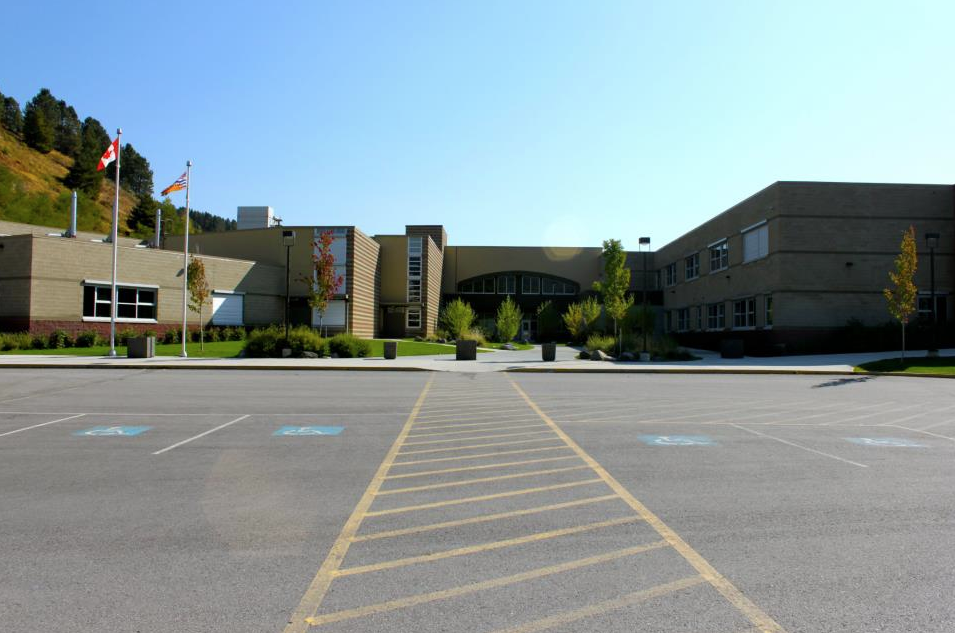

Location
- 1300 Frances Moran Rd; Trail, British Columbia, V1R 4L9; Canada; 49.1021°N 117.6981°W

Information
- School type: Public, high school
- Motto: "The Place To Be"
- Established: 1951
- School board: School District 20 Kootenay-Columbia
- Superintendent: Ms. Katherine Shearer
- School number: 2011012
- Principal: Christine Byrd
- Staff: 45
- Grades: 8–12
- Enrollment: 889 (2025/2026)
- Language: English
- Area: West Kootenays
- Colours: Navy Blue, Red, White
- Mascot: Henry the Hawk
- Team name: Hawks
- Website: www.jlcrowe.org
- Last updated: October 3, 2026

J Lloyd Crowe Secondary School (commonly referred to as J.L. Crowe) is a public high school in Trail, British Columbia, and is part of School District 20 Kootenay-Columbia. The original school was built in 1951, followed by a demolition in 2007 and opened up again in 2009. The school serves the local areas including Trail, Rossland, Fruitvale, Warfield, and Montrose.

== History ==
JL Crowe was founded in 1951 after demand grew with the aging Trail. The shops were extensive as Cominco hosted the largest apprenticeship program at Crowe in Western Canada. The school also held 1st year Arts and Science classes until 1966 when Selkirk Regional College opened. It was originally a grades 10-12 plus 1st year Arts & Science, as there were 2 middle schools in the area. Modifications were made to the school during the mid 70s, and 80s, and a bigger library. After 58 years the school was demolished, and a new one was built.

== Staff ==
=== Administration ===
- Christine Byrd (Principal),

== New school ==
In late 2007, construction of a new school began on the field adjacent to the original school. The new building was opened in September 2009, and demolition of the old building was completed a few weeks later. It came with state of the art technology, including document cameras in most classrooms, and 70 new iPads that were later added for learning use. The new school has a gym, cardio room, weight room, a full science lab, and five classrooms for shop classes, including woodworking, metalworking, and electronics.

== Student life ==
Students have a wide variety of classes to choose from, including art classes to shop classes. Students can also enter in before and after school activities including debate, theatre, band, strength training, cross-training, volleyball, basketball, swimming, field hockey, hockey, track and field, rugby, and cross country running. As of the 2019/2020 school year there were 826 students attending the school.

== Extracurricular activities ==
Activities are run by the schools Leadership team. They include assemblies and other fun activities. They also make videos and post them on YouTube, and can be found under Crowe Television.

== Student Council 2025-2026 ==
The student council is made up of 2 co-presidents, one vice-president, a treasurer, and a secretary from grade 12. There is also 3 representatives from each grade, with the exception of grade 8 which only has 2 representatives, due to only 2 people signing up.

== Notable alumni ==
- Gerry Moro - Olympian 1964 & 1972 Track and Field
- Dianne Gerace - Olympian 1964 Track and Field
- Jason Bay - Major League Baseball Rookie of the year
- Lauren Bay-Regula - Olympian 2004 & 2020 Fastball
- Ben McPeek - composer, arranger, conductor, pianist
- Kerrin Lee-Gartner - olympic medalist in downhill skiing
- Cesare Maniago, NHL Hockey Player
- Seth Martin, NHL Hockey Player
- Adam Deadmarsh, NHL Hockey Player
- Dallas Drake, NHL Hockey Player
- Ray Ferraro, NHL Hockey Player
- Mike Matteucci, NHL Hockey Player
- Steve Tambellini, NHL Hockey Player
- Steve McCarthy, NHL Hockey Player
- Ed Cristofoli, NHL Hockey Player
- Garth Rizzuto, NHL Hockey Player

== See also ==
- List of school districts in British Columbia
- West Kootenay
