= Moyie Lake Provincial Park =

Provincial park in British Columbia, Canada

- IUCN category II (national park)
- Location within British Columbia
- Interactive map of Moyie Lake Provincial Park
- Location: British Columbia, Canada
- Nearest city: Cranbrook
- Coordinates: 49°22′19″N 115°50′25″W
- Area: 0.9 km^{2} (0.35 sq mi)
- Established: July 7, 1959
- Governing body: BC Parks

Moyie Lake Provincial Park is a provincial park in British Columbia, Canada. It is located on Moyie Lake, part of the Moyie River.
