= Gladstone Provincial Park =

Provincial park in British Columbia, Canada

- IUCN category Ib (wilderness area)
- Location within British Columbia
- Interactive map of Gladstone Provincial Park
- Location: Kootenay Boundary, British Columbia, Canada
- Nearest city: Grand Forks
- Coordinates: 49°18′00″N 118°15′00″W
- Area: 39,387 ha (152.07 sq mi)
- Established: July 12, 1995
- Governing body: BC Parks

Gladstone Provincial Park is a provincial park in British Columbia, Canada, surrounding and north of the north end of Christina Lake in that province's Boundary Country.

== History ==
The park was established July 1995. Gladstone Park includes the former Ole Johnson and Texas Creek parks.

== Conservation ==
The park aims to protect blue-listed California bighorn sheep, Grizzly bear and the red-listed Northern leopard frog.

== Recreation ==
The following recreational activities are encouraged: Camping, hiking (there are over 48 km of trails in the park), fishing (for Kokanee, Rainbow Trout and Small-mouth Bass), swimming, canoeing and kayaking.

== Location ==
Located 20 kilometres northeast of Grand Forks, British Columbia on Hwy 3 at the north end of Christina Lake in the Monashee Mountains.

== Size ==
39,387 hectares in size.
