= Jimsmith Lake Provincial Park =

Provincial park in British Columbia

- IUCN category II (national park)
- Location within British Columbia
- Interactive map of Jimsmith Lake Provincial Park
- Location: Kootenay Land District, British Columbia, Canada
- Nearest city: Cranbrook, BC
- Coordinates: 49°28′57″N 115°50′27″W
- Area: 13.7 ha (34 acres)
- Established: March 16, 1956
- Governing body: BC Parks

Jimsmith Lake Provincial Park is a provincial park in British Columbia, Canada. The small park has Jimsmith Lake surrounded by mixed forest. It is located just south of Cranbrook.

The Jimsmith Lake Provincial Park is spread over an area of 13.70 hectares. Forests of Douglas fir, also known as the Colombian Pine, and larch cover the lake shore. The park is popular haunt for picnickers and visitors from the nearby city of Cranbrook. The park has some 35 camping sites. In 2001, they were modified to accommodate recreational vehicles. The park draws visitors for recreational activities like sunbathing, swimming, non-motorized boating and picnicking. Nature walks and bird watching are also popular activities here. In winter, when the park is covered in snow, people also enjoy ice skating.

== Climate ==
Climate is from Cranbrook, 7 km (4.3 mi) away.

Climate data for Cranbrook (Cranbrook/Canadian Rockies International Airport) WMO ID: 71880; coordinates 49°36′44″N 115°46′55″W; elevation: 940.0 m (3,084.0 ft); 1991-2020 normals (sun 1981–2010), , extremes 1901–2010 (Note: Climate data was recorded at Cranbrook from January 1901 to March 1939 and at Cranbrook Airport from February 1938 to present.)
Month	Jan	Feb	Mar	Apr	May	Jun	Jul	Aug	Sep	Oct	Nov	Dec	Year
Record high humidex	0.0	0.0	0.0	0.0	0.2	1.5	9.1	8.3	0.86	0.0	0.0	0.0	19.9
Record high °C (°F)	13.9 (57.0)	13.5 (56.3)	22.4 (72.3)	28.0 (82.4)	34.2 (93.6)	40.1 (104.2)	36.7 (98.1)	40.5 (104.9)	34.9 (94.8)	29.2 (84.6)	19.5 (67.1)	12.2 (54.0)	40.4 (104.7)
Mean daily maximum °C (°F)	−1.9 (28.6)	1.6 (34.9)	7.3 (45.1)	12.8 (55.0)	18.3 (64.9)	21.5 (70.7)	26.9 (80.4)	26.6 (79.9)	20.4 (68.7)	11.4 (52.5)	2.7 (36.9)	−2.8 (27.0)	12.1 (53.8)
Daily mean °C (°F)	−6.1 (21.0)	−3.5 (25.7)	1.8 (35.2)	6.4 (43.5)	11.5 (52.7)	14.9 (58.8)	19.2 (66.6)	18.6 (65.5)	13.1 (55.6)	5.6 (42.1)	−1.3 (29.7)	−6.5 (20.3)	6.1 (43.0)
Mean daily minimum °C (°F)	−10.1 (13.8)	−8.6 (16.5)	−3.8 (25.2)	0.0 (32.0)	4.7 (40.5)	8.2 (46.8)	11.3 (52.3)	10.4 (50.7)	5.7 (42.3)	−0.3 (31.5)	−5.3 (22.5)	−10.1 (13.8)	0.2 (32.4)
Record low °C (°F)	−41.1 (−42.0)	−31.8 (−25.2)	−28.3 (−18.9)	−15.6 (3.9)	−6.1 (21.0)	−1.3 (29.7)	1.0 (33.8)	−1.3 (29.7)	−6.9 (19.6)	−18.5 (−1.3)	−31.8 (−25.2)	−40.0 (−40.0)	−40.0 (−40.0)
Record low wind chill	−43.2	−39.1	−37.2	−19.7	−8.9	−5.0	0.0	−2.9	−9.4	−22.6	−37.4	−46.8	−46.8
Average precipitation mm (inches)	26.7 (1.05)	19.9 (0.78)	26.5 (1.04)	23.2 (0.91)	42.0 (1.65)	62.2 (2.45)	35.4 (1.39)	24.0 (0.94)	30.1 (1.19)	26.1 (1.03)	34.8 (1.37)	34.8 (1.37)	385.5 (15.18)
Average rainfall mm (inches)	4.8 (0.19)	3.4 (0.13)	11.9 (0.47)	17.7 (0.70)	41.1 (1.62)	66.4 (2.61)	38.1 (1.50)	25.4 (1.00)	30.9 (1.22)	18.7 (0.74)	13.8 (0.54)	6.6 (0.26)	278.9 (10.98)
Average snowfall cm (inches)	27.8 (10.9)	17.4 (6.9)	15.5 (6.1)	6.4 (2.5)	1.4 (0.6)	0.0 (0.0)	0.0 (0.0)	0.0 (0.0)	0.0 (0.0)	5.8 (2.3)	23.9 (9.4)	34.6 (13.6)	132.6 (52.2)
Average precipitation days (≥ 0.2 mm)	12.3	9.1	10.0	9.2	11.0	13.4	8.6	7.2	8.0	9.6	12.3	12.9	123.5
Average rainy days (≥ 0.2 mm)	3.0	2.3	5.3	7.4	10.9	13.7	8.8	7.7	8.0	8.0	5.4	2.5	82.9
Average snowy days (≥ 0.2 cm)	10.9	7.6	6.4	3.0	0.7	0.0	0.0	0.0	0.0	1.8	7.8	12.1	50.2
Average relative humidity (%) (at 1500 LST)	71.9	58.5	48.7	41.0	40.2	42.6	33.7	32.2	39.7	50.7	67.8	75.2	50.2
Mean monthly sunshine hours	63.5	106.9	163.2	215.0	256.7	267.8	315.1	302.7	218.2	159.5	69.8	51.9	2,190.5
Percentage possible sunshine	23.7	37.5	44.4	52.2	54.0	55.0	64.2	67.7	57.5	47.6	25.5	20.4	45.8
Source: Environment and Climate Change Canada (sun 1981-2010) (January minimum) {June maximum) (August maximum)
