= Morrissey Provincial Park =

British Columbia provincial park

- IUCN category II (national park)
- Location within British Columbia
- Interactive map of Morrissey Provincial Park
- Location: British Columbia, Canada
- Nearest city: Fernie
- Coordinates: 49°23′25″N 115°01′03″W
- Area: 0.04 km^{2} (0.015 sq mi)
- Established: August 6, 1962
- Governing body: BC Parks

Morrissey Provincial Park is a provincial park near the southeastern corner of British Columbia, Canada. The park is primitive, with no designated picnic or day-use areas, and no available parking. The park protects a remnant Black Cottonwood (Populus trichocarpa) ecosystem.
