= Ryan Provincial Park =

Provincial park in British Columbia, Canada

- IUCN category II (national park)
- Location within British Columbia
- Interactive map of Ryan Provincial Park
- Location: British Columbia, Canada
- Nearest city: Creston
- Coordinates: 49°08′09″N 116°01′55″W
- Area: 0.58 km^{2} (0.22 sq mi)
- Established: September 3, 1971
- Governing body: BC Parks

Ryan Provincial Park is a provincial park in British Columbia, Canada.
