= Conkle Lake Provincial Park =

Provincial park in British Columbia, Canada

- IUCN category II (national park)
- Location within British Columbia
- Interactive map of Conkle Lake Provincial Park
- Location: Similkameen Division Yale Land District, British Columbia, Canada
- Nearest city: Osoyoos, BC
- Coordinates: 49°10′19″N 119°06′00″W
- Area: 587 ha (1,450 acres)
- Established: March 15, 1973
- Governing body: BC Parks

Conkle Lake Provincial Park is a provincial park in British Columbia, Canada, west of the confluence of the Kettle and West Kettle Rivers. The park size is 587 hectares. Bird species that live in the area are the common loon, merganser, ruffed grouse, pileated woodpecker, black-capped chickadee, and ruby-crowned kinglet. Mammals that live in the area are bears, squirrels, raccoons, rodents, beavers, deer, rabbits, foxes, and moose.
