= Christina Lake Provincial Park =

Provincial park in British Columbia

- IUCN category II (national park)
- Location within British Columbia
- Interactive map of Christina Lake Provincial Park
- Location: Similkameen Yale Land District, British Columbia, Canada
- Nearest city: Grand Forks, BC
- Coordinates: 49°02′33″N 118°13′07″W
- Area: 6 ha (15 acres)
- Established: April 26, 1971
- Governing body: BC Parks
- Website: bcparks.ca/christina-lake-park/

Christina Lake Provincial Park is a provincial park in British Columbia, Canada. The lake it's on, Christina Lake, is renowned as the warmest lake in Canada.

== See also ==
- Christina Lake (British Columbia) – lake
- Christina Lake, British Columbia – community
