= McDonald Creek (Walker County, Texas) =

Coordinates: 30°34′50″N 95°38′10″W

McDonald Creek is a creek in Walker County, Texas, United States.

McDonald Creek has the name of William McDonald, a pioneer who settled there.

== See also ==
- List of rivers of Texas
