= Lockhart Creek Provincial Park =

Provincial park in British Columbia, Canada

- IUCN category II (national park)
- Location within British Columbia
- Interactive map of Lockhart Creek Provincial Park
- Location: British Columbia, Canada
- Nearest city: Creston
- Coordinates: 49°30′09″N 116°42′34″W
- Area: 37.5 km^{2} (14.5 sq mi)
- Established: July 13, 1995
- Governing body: BC Parks

Lockhart Creek Provincial Park is a provincial park in British Columbia, Canada, located adjacent to Lockhart Beach Provincial Park, 40 km north of Creston, British Columbia on the east shore of Kootenay Lake.

== History ==
The park was established 1995.

== Conservation ==
The park aims to protect an old-growth cedar-hemlock forest, as well as a wide variety of fish and bird life. The park encompasses one of the few /valleys in the region without roads and protects a diverse old-growth forest.

== Recreation ==
The following recreational activities are available: backcountry camping, hiking, fishing (in season), and hunting (in season). Multi-day backpackers can access Kianuko Provincial Park from Lockhart Creek.

== Location ==
Located 40 kilometres north of Creston, British Columbia on the east side of Kootenay Lake.

== Size ==
3,734 hectares in size.
