= Kianuko Provincial Park =

Provincial park in British Columbia, Canada

- IUCN category II (national park)
- Location within British Columbia
- Interactive map of Kianuko Provincial Park
- Location: British Columbia, Canada
- Nearest city: Creston
- Coordinates: 49°25′44″N 116°28′00″W
- Area: 116.37 km^{2} (44.93 sq mi)
- Established: July 13, 1995
- Governing body: BC Parks

Kianuko Provincial Park is a provincial park in British Columbia, Canada.

== History ==
The park was established on July 12, 1995. This is an area of Ktunaxa-kinbasket First Nation traditional use and has high spiritual values.

== Conservation ==
The park aims to protect important habitat for caribou, moose and grizzly bear, and fish.

== Recreation ==
The following recreational activities are available: backcountry camping and hiking, fishing, and hunting.

== Location ==
Located 40 kilometres north of Creston, British Columbia. Access to the park is usually done by hiking from Lockhart Creek Provincial Park, but vehicle access to the park boundary is possible via old unmaintained forestry roads.

== Size ==
11,638 hectares in size. On Vehicle to Park Gate from Highway # 3 in Kitchener, via Goat River Rd and Skelly Creek Road. Only hiking or on Horseback into the Park is accepted.
