= Rosebery Provincial Park =

Provincial park in British Columbia, Canada

- IUCN category II (national park)
- Location within British Columbia
- Interactive map of Rosebery Provincial Park
- Location: British Columbia, Canada
- Nearest city: New Denver
- Coordinates: 50°02′07″N 117°24′14″W
- Area: 0.32 km^{2} (0.12 sq mi)
- Established: 1959
- Governing body: BC Parks

Rosebery Provincial Park is a provincial park in British Columbia, Canada.
