= Premier Lake Provincial Park =

Provincial park in southeastern British Columbia, Canada

Coordinates: 49.8499°N 115.6525°W

Premier Lake Provincial Park is a provincial park near Cranbrook, British Columbia . It is located on the south and western shores of Premier Lake in the East Kootenays, a small (5 km long) lake situated on the eastern flank of the Kootenay trench about 60 km north of Cranbrook. Also contained within the park are several smaller lakes, including Rockbluff (Quartz) Lake, Yankee Lake and Canuck Lake, all notable for the vivid green colour of their water.
