= School District 20 Kootenay-Columbia =

School district in British Columbia, Canada

School District No. 20 (Kootenay-Columbia)
- School District 20 Kootenay-Columbia Logo

Location
- Trail Trail, Warfield, Castlegar, Rossland, Robson, Fruitvale in Kootenays Canada

District information
- Superintendent: Ms. Katherine Shearer
- Schools: 12
- Budget: CA$50.09 million

Students and staff
- Students: 4,806 (2024/2025)

Other information
- Website: www.sd20.bc.ca

School District No. 20 (Kootenay-Columbia) is a school district in southeastern British Columbia. It includes Trail, Castlegar, Rossland, Warfield, and Fruitvale.

== History ==
The Kootenay-Columbia School District was created in 1996 by combining School District 9 (Castlegar) and School District 11 (Trail).

== Schools ==
Information in this table changes regularly, but the listed values are not always accurate. Listed values are current as of October 14, 2024

School	Number	Location	Grades	Enrollment	Moniker	Principal
Continuing Education SD20	2020000	Trail	10–12, Graduated Adult	32		Not confirmed
Fruitvale Elementary School	2011005	Fruitvale	K–7	390	Falcons	Mike Page
Glenmerry Elementary School	2011015	Trail	K–7	422	Grizzlies	Beverly Kanda
J. Lloyd Crowe Secondary School	2011012	Trail	8–12	953	Hawks	Christine Byrd
James L Webster Elementary School	2011009	Warfield (Trail)	K–7	311	Lions	Mr. Brian Stefani
Kinnaird Elementary School	2009006	Castlegar	K–7	474	Cobras	Mrs. Leanne McKenzie
Kootenay-Columbia Learning Centre Kootenay-Columbia Secondary School	2099137	Trail	6–12	124		
Kootenay-Columbia Learning Centre Kootenay-Columbia Secondary School	2099090	Castlegar	9–12	61		Patrick Kinghorn
Robson Community School	2020021	Robson	K–7	236	Raptors	Denise Laurie
Rossland Summit School	2011014	Rossland	K–9	539	Royals	David DeRosa
Stanley Humphries Secondary School	2009010	Castlegar	8–12	785	Coyotes	Stephanie Liethead
Twin Rivers Elementary School	2009011	Castlegar	K–7	572	Tigers	Wendy Cutler
Castlegar Primary Campus		Castlegar	3–7 K–2	427	Tigers	Wendy Cutler
St. Michael's Catholic School* (Independent)		Trail	K-7	150	Saints	Miguel Arruda

== Old Schools ==
Before 2003, there was also a Sunningdale and Montrose Elementary school, both of which were disbanded in 2003. The Sunningdale Elementary school was changed to a middle school, before it was finally sold by the district in 2012.

== See also ==
- List of school districts in British Columbia
