= Stanley Humphries Secondary School =

Stanley Humphries Secondary
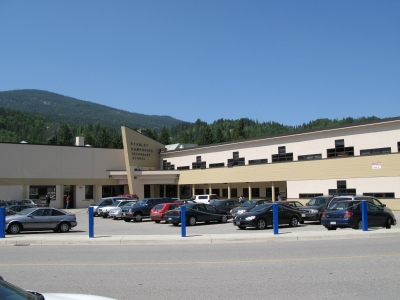

Location
- 720 7 Ave; Castlegar, British Columbia, V1N 1R5; Canada; 49.31997°N 117.66069°W

Information
- School type: Public, high school
- Motto: Carpe Diem (Seize the Day)
- Founded: 1951
- Founder: Nikolai Stepanovich Sokolov (Russian: Николай Степанович Соколов)
- School board: School District 20 Kootenay-Columbia
- Superintendent: Katherine Shearer
- Area trustee: Catherine Zaitsoff
- School number: 2009010
- Principal: Stephanie Leithead
- Staff: 51
- Grades: 8 - 12
- Enrollment: 731 (2025/2026)
- Language: English, French, Russian
- Colours: Yellow and Blue
- Mascot: Flash the Coyote
- Team name: Coyotes
- Website: shsscastlegar.com
- Last updated: October 3, 2026

Stanley Humphries Secondary, also known as "SHSS", is a public high school in Castlegar, British Columbia part of School District 20 Kootenay-Columbia. Stanley Humphries was founded in 1951 and continues to be open to the community.

Stanley Humphries is the main Secondary School for the Castlegar area. Known colloquially as "SH", the school houses grades 8 to grade 12 in a building located in the centre of the downtown residential core, surrounded by several other schools, including Selkirk College, across the river, Twin Rivers Elementary, and Castlegar Primary, both of which sit directly adjacent to SHSS.

As of the 2024/2025 school year, the school provides access to various electronic devices for the students to use during class, such as laptops and iPads.
