= Syringa Provincial Park =

Canadian provincial park

- IUCN category II (national park)
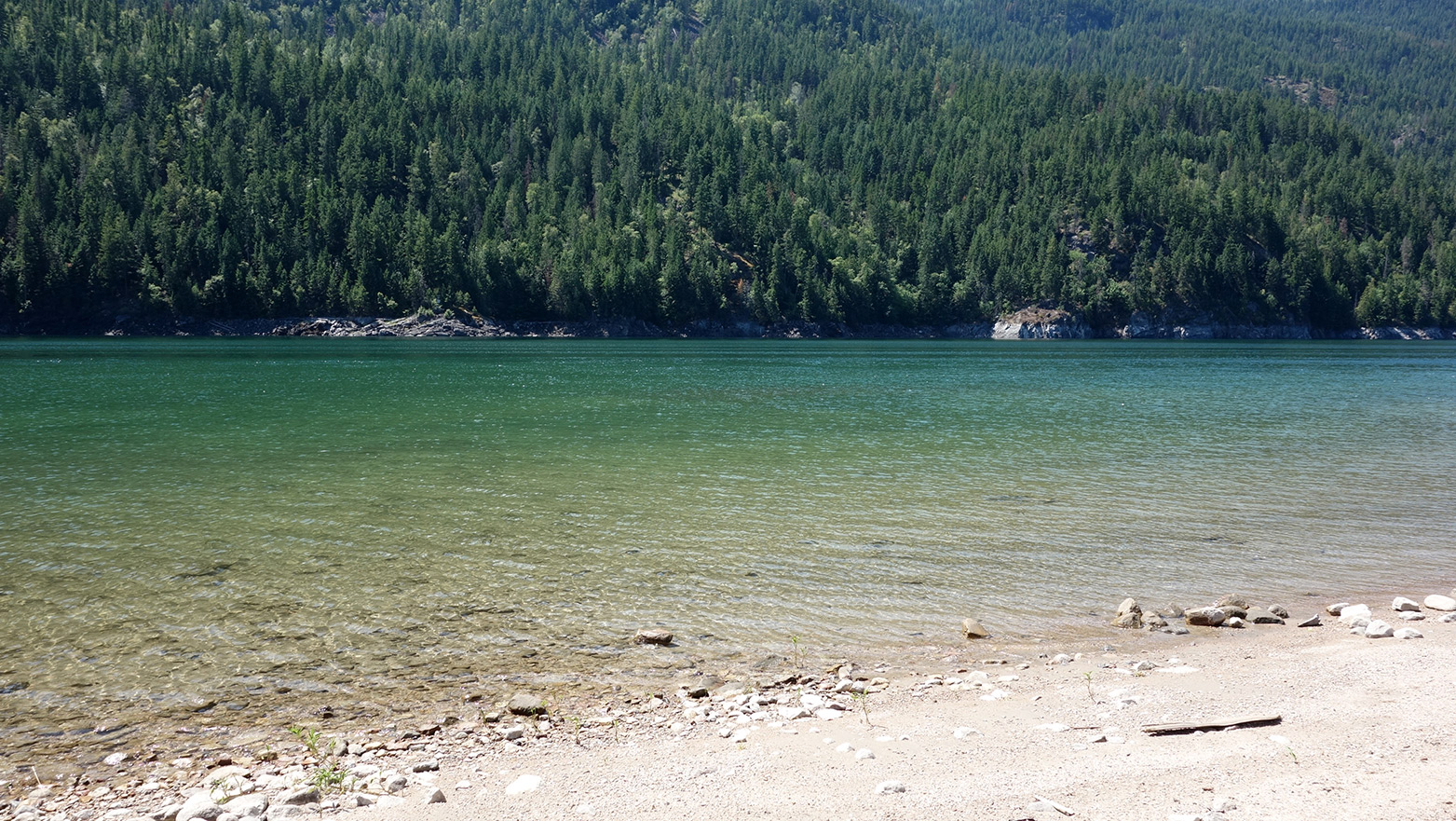
- Lower Arrow Lake, Syringa Park, 2015

- Location within British Columbia
- Interactive map of Syringa Provincial Park
- Location: British Columbia, Canada
- Nearest city: Castlegar
- Coordinates: 49°22′44″N 117°53′44″W
- Area: 45.03 km^{2} (17.39 sq mi)
- Established: November 19, 1968
- Governing body: BC Parks

Syringa Park is a provincial park on the east shore of Lower Arrow Lake in the West Kootenay region of southeastern British Columbia. At the foot of the Norns Range, Tulip Creek passes through the centre, and Syringa Creek is closer to the southeastern boundary. The park is about 19 kilometres (12 mi) west of Castlegar via Broadwater Rd.

== Name origin ==
In 1903, David Loughnan and Robert Russell Rose spent several months camped by Syringa Creek, which they named on observing the preponderance of syringa. The men had been hired by a British aristocrat to log the land, but could not receive mail to their camp unless the place was given an official name. The following year, the Geographic Board of Canada officially adopted the name. The mock-orange syringa, indigenous to the area, blooms in the early spring, releasing a distinct scent. The area has cultural and spiritual significance to the Okanagan, Shuswap and Ktunaxa-kinbasket First Nations. A European community soon developed on what was the Columbia River foreshore. Residents relocated prior to the reservoir for the Keenleyside Dam submerging the area in 1968.

== Park profile ==
In 1968, following the dam construction, Syringa Creek Provincial Park was established. In 1995, the park expanded and the name contracted to Syringa Park. In 2019, private land acquisition expanded the park by 35 hectares. The park currently encompasses 4,499 hectares.

== Park facilities ==
One of the largest provincial campgrounds in the region, many of the approximately 70 sites have electrical outlets. All have fire pits. The two separated camping areas are the Big Horn, adjacent to the day-use area overlooking the lake, and the other back from the water. Showers, and a combination of pit and flush toilets exist. The location has two boat ramps, an archaeological site, three rocky beaches and outdoor nature displays. A $350,000 upgrade to the filtration of drinking water lifted the longstanding "boil water advisory" for the reopening of the park for the 2021 camping season.

== Flora & fauna ==
The moderately warm and dry climate promotes the growth of Ponderosa Pine and bunchgrass, creating one of the few unique grassland ecosystems in the Kootenays. Wildlife includes elk, deer, and rocky mountain bighorn sheep that graze on the rock bluffs.

== Recreational activities ==
Fishing, swimming, waterskiing, canoeing and kayaking are popular. The Yellow Pine Nature Trail, about 4 kilometres (2.5 mi), is a moderately difficult steep climb from behind the park. The trail presents mature yellow pine, several granite rock outcroppings, and lake views, which can be enjoyed especially from the first lookout or farther up at the summit. Other hikes are the Middle Trail and Syringa Trail, leading to additional viewpoints.

== See also ==
- List of British Columbia Provincial Parks
