= West Kootenay Regional Airport =

West Kootenay Regional Airport Castlegar/West Kootenay Regional Airport
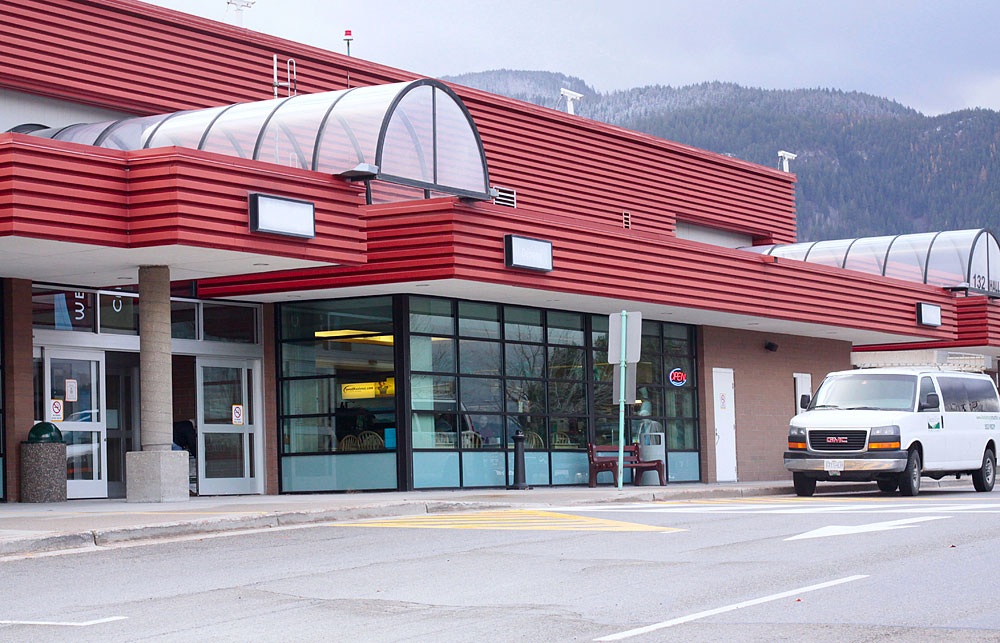
- IATA: YCG; ICAO: CYCG

Summary
- Airport type: Public
- Owner/Operator: City of Castlegar
- Location: Castlegar, British Columbia
- Time zone: MST (UTC−07:00)
- Elevation AMSL: 1,626 ft / 496 m
- Coordinates: 49°17′46″N 117°37′57″W
- Website: www.wkrairport.ca

Map
- Location in British Columbia

Runways
Direction	Length		Surface
Direction	ft	m	Surface
15/33	5,299	1,615	Asphalt

Statistics (2024)
- Passengers: 28,800
- Sources: DestinationBC; Canada Flight Supplement and Transport Canada; Movements from Statistics Canada

The West Kootenay Regional Airport (Castlegar Airport) (IATA: YCG, ICAO: CYCG) is a small regional airport located 2 nautical miles (3.7 km; 2.3 mi) south southeast of Castlegar, British Columbia, Canada. It serves the West Kootenay region, including Castlegar, Nelson and Trail. It is owned and operated by the City of Castlegar, and has a 15,317 sq ft (1,423 m^{2}) passenger terminal.

Due to the mountainous terrain impinging on both runway approaches, there is no possibility of a straight-in approach. The airport is therefore certified for day operations only, and the glideslope on approach is set to a steep 5.0° rather than the standard 3.0°. The instrument approaches to Castlegar are considered among the most challenging of any in use at a commercial airport in North America. The airport has earned the nickhame "Cancelgar" due to the frequency of weather-related flight cancellations.

In 2006, Castlegar airport was developing departure procedures for night time operation, but as of 2010 the airport was certified for daytime operation only. A $1 million programme installed six beacons on the hills of the Columbia Valley that allow night-time take offs from the airport. It is expected that this will only be used by air ambulances and medical traffic.

Central Mountain Air began service to the airport in October 2020 using Beechcraft 1900D aircraft. On June 14, 2021, Central Mountain Air announced they would suspend service on July 5, 2021.

In May 2021, Air Canada announced they will be using 78 passenger De Havilland Dash-8-400s when they resume service following route suspension due to the COVID-19 pandemic.

The airport is classified as an airport of entry by Nav Canada and is staffed by the Canada Border Services Agency (CBSA). The customs at CBSA officers at this airport can handle general aviation aircraft only, with no more than 15 passengers.
