= Christina Lake (British Columbia) =

Lake in British Columbia, Canada

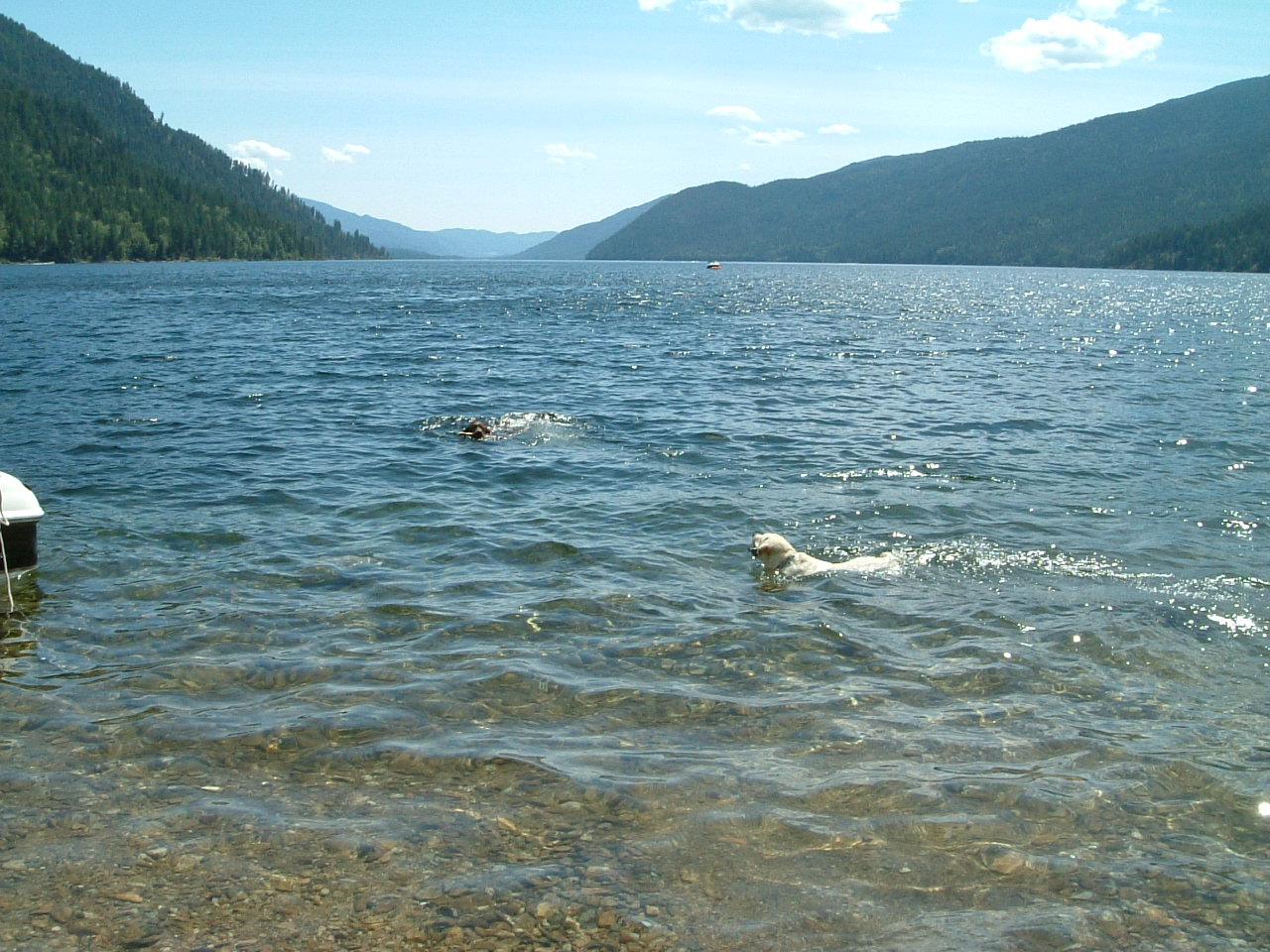

- Location within British Columbia
- Location: British Columbia
- Coordinates: 49°07′N 118°15′W
- Primary outflows: Christina Creek
- Basin countries: Canada
- Max. length: 18.12 km (11.26 mi)
- Max. width: 1.5 km (0.93 mi)
- Surface area: 25.489 km^{2} (9.841 sq mi)
- Surface elevation: 446 m (1,463 ft)

Christina Lake is a lake located along the Crowsnest Highway in the south-central area of British Columbia known as Boundary Country, which separates the Okanagan region from the Kootenays. It is located 23 kilometers east of Grand Forks, just 1 km north of the United States border. The region experiences very hot, dry summers which results in July and early August water temperatures averaging in the 26 °C (80 Degrees Fahrenheit) range. Divers will experience thermoclines beginning at a depth of approximately 10 feet in the summer. The lake is renowned as the warmest tree-lined lake in British Columbia.

== History ==
Christina Lake was named after a Métis woman named Christina McDonald, the daughter of the Hudson's Bay Company chief factor Angus McDonald of Fort Colvile (1852–1871).

The Kettle Valley region had been inhabited by the Kettle Indians for thousands of years before the arrival of European settlers. They lived in villages along the Kettle River, leaving their legacy in pictographs on rocks along the shores of Christina Lake — visible from a boat only.

Four cabins previously used as part of a Japanese internment camp during WWII still remain as part of the Christina Lake Alpine Resort.

== Attractions ==
The Trans Canada Trail, Dewdney Trail and the Kettle Valley Railway Trail all merge at the lake, attracting visitors to the area from all over. The region is frequented by hikers and bikers along the local trails in the lake area.

Vacation homes surround the lake and outdoor adventure providers cater to adventure enthusiasts. Not considered a great sport fishing lake, it is home to trout, smallmouth bass and kokanee salmon, which can be found spawning along McRae Creek and Sandner Creek each fall.

The lake has many beaches in Gladstone Provincial Park, which surrounds the entire northern half of the lake. Boat access recreation sites are available on the western shore, at various locations. Several boat access beaches offer camping, swimming and fishing on the west shore. Christina Lake Provincial Park, located at the south end of the lake is home to the largest of the public beaches. The lake is surrounded by the Christina and Rossland Ranges of the Monashee Mountains.

The area is also home to Christina Lake Golf Club, an 18-hole, 6,685-yard (6,113 m) championship course designed by golf course architect Les Furber. The course has a rare feature, black sand traps.

== See also ==
- List of lakes of British Columbia
