= Castlegar, British Columbia =

Castlegar
- City
- City of Castlegar
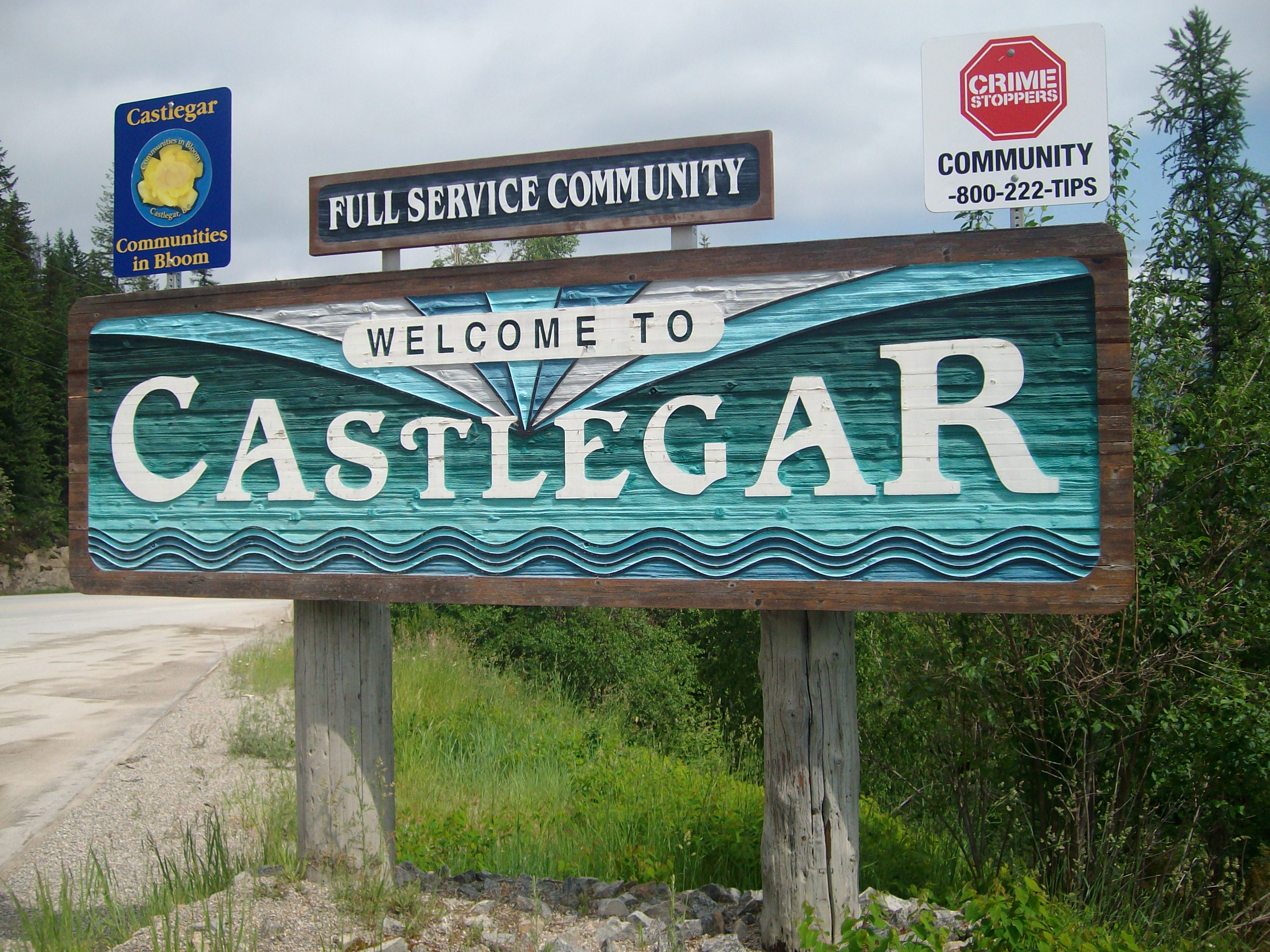
- Motto: "Haec Lumina Numquam Errantiae" (Latin) "These Lights Never Wander"
- Location of Castlegar in British Columbia
- Coordinates: 49°19′28″N 117°40′01″W
- Country: Canada
- Province: British Columbia
- Region: West Kootenay
- Regional district: Central Kootenay
- Incorporated: 1946

Government
  - Type: Elected city council
  - Mayor: Brian Bogle
  - Governing body: Castlegar City Council
  - MP: Helena Konanz (Conservative)
  - MLA: Steve Morissette (BC NDP)

Area
  - Land: 19.87 km^{2} (7.67 sq mi)
- Elevation At airport: 495.6 m (1,626 ft)

Population (2021)
  - Total: 8,338
  - Density: 419.6/km^{2} (1,087/sq mi)
- Time zone: UTC−07:00 (PT)
- Forward sortation area: V1N
- Area code: 250 / 778 / 236 / 672
- Website: www.castlegar.ca

Castlegar is a community in the West Kootenay region of British Columbia, Canada. In the Selkirk Mountains, at the confluence of the Kootenay and Columbia Rivers, it is a regional trade and transportation centre, with a local economy based on forestry, mining and tourism.

Castlegar is home to Selkirk College, a regional airport, a pulp mill, and several sawmills. Its population of 8,338 includes many Doukhobors, who were largely responsible for much of the town's early development and growth.

The area which became Castlegar was an important centre for the Sinixt (Lakes) Peoples. Outside the city limits are the small surrounding communities of Ootischenia, Brilliant, Robson, Robson West, Raspberry, Tarrys, Thrums, Glade, Shoreacres, Fairview, Genelle, Pass Creek and Krestova, and the much smaller communities of Deer Park, Renata, and Syringa on Lower Arrow Lake. These outlying areas have a further population of about 8,000 people.

== History ==
On 5 September 1811, David Thompson arrived in the area of present-day Castlegar, and camped near the mouth of the Kootenay River. A plaque dedicated to him is on the east bank of the Columbia River overlooking the town.

The area's first settlement was West Waterloo, now known as South Castlegar. With widespread provincial interest in gold prospecting in the late 19th century, by 1895 there were 40 houses in Waterloo. The town boomed until the end of the century when interest in the local mines declined.

Castlegar takes its name from Castlegar Estate, the ancestral home of townsite founder Edward Mahon, near Ahascragh in County Galway, Ireland. Castlegar, BC was planned in 1897. Around 1902, the Canadian Pacific Railway (CPR) built the bridge there and laid the wide-gauge railway tracks to Trail. They built a boxcar station at the old Waterloo Trail crossing and named it Kinnaird Station in honour of Lord Kinnaird, a CPR shareholder.

There was little in Castlegar until after the completion of the CPR bridge. A Mr. Farmer built the first store, housing both the post office and town hall. William Gage built the Castlegar Hotel in 1908, which stood until 1982 when it was destroyed by fire. Also in 1908, the first schoolhouse was built by a few local residents. A dance pavilion, garage, tourist cabins and a slaughterhouse were established by 1925.

On 30 October 1946, Castlegar was incorporated into a village; and in 1966, became a town. It amalgamated with neighbouring Kinnaird into a city on 1 January 1974, effectively doubling its population. On 20 May 2004, the city's boundary was extended to include the Blueberry Creek Irrigation District.

=== Indigenous peoples history ===
Castlegar is in the border area between the Sinixt (Interior Salish) and Ktunaxa Indian bands. Experts cannot agree where one band's range ended and the other's began, as there was much overlapping of cultural and territorial activity between them. Most recent information suggests that the Sinixt were the area's original people, and that the Kootenai arrived several hundred years ago from central Canada.

Kp'itl'els was an Indigenous settlement on the north side of the Kootenay River, just above the junction with the Columbia River. Implements such as arrowheads and pestles have been found along the nearby Arrow Lakes. A reconstructed kekuli dwelling was discovered on Zuckerberg Island, at the confluence of the Kootenay and Columbia rivers.

=== Doukhobor history ===
The Doukhobors operated a ferry near Brilliant on the Kootenay River in 1910, and the Christian Community of Universal Brotherhood (CCUB) applied to CPR for a railway station and siding to that point. Brilliant was the centre of the CCUB commercial enterprises, including the Brilliant Jam Factory, a grain elevator, and a flax mill.

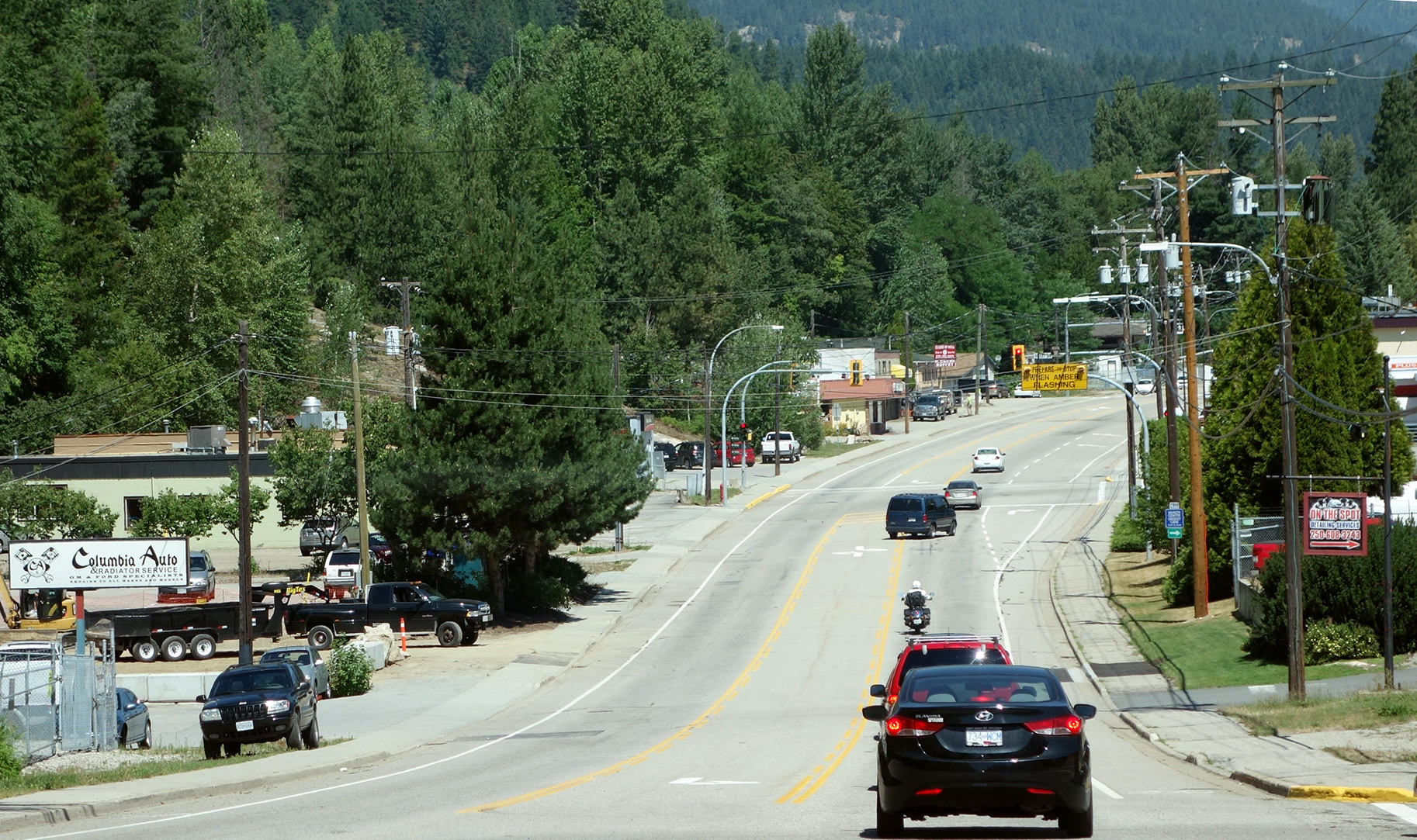
Columbia Avenue

== Demographics ==
In the 2021 Census of Population conducted by Statistics Canada, Castlegar had a population of 8,338 living in 3,549 of its 3,702 total private dwellings, a change of 3.7% from its 2016 population of 8,039. With a land area of 19.87 km^{2} (7.67 sq mi), it had a population density of 419.6/km^{2} (1,086.8/sq mi) in 2021.

- Population (2016): 9,023
- Population (2011): 7,816
- Population (2006): 7,259
  - Growth Rate: +7.7%
- Total Private Dwellings: 3,349
- Population Density: 399.3 per km²
- Area: 19.8 km²
- Median Age: 46.1
- Number of Immigrants: 725

=== Ethnicity ===
Panethnic groups in the City of Castlegar (1996−2021)
Panethnic group	2021		2016		2011		2006		2001		1996	
Panethnic group	Pop.	%	Pop.	%	Pop.	%	Pop.	%	Pop.	%	Pop.	%
European (Note: Statistic includes all persons that did not make up part of a visible minority or an indigenous identity.)	6,920	85.86%	6,885	88.5%	6,900	91.33%	6,610	93.63%	6,530	94.78%	6,500	93.93%
Indigenous	550	6.82%	415	5.33%	345	4.57%	275	3.9%	215	3.12%	190	2.75%
South Asian	270	3.35%	215	2.76%	60	0.79%	15	0.21%	20	0.29%	120	1.73%
East Asian (Note: Statistic includes total responses of "Chinese", "Korean", and "Japanese" under visible minority section on census.)	145	1.8%	100	1.29%	135	1.79%	65	0.92%	30	0.44%	50	0.72%
Southeast Asian (Note: Statistic includes total responses of "Filipino" and "Southeast Asian" under visible minority section on census.)	100	1.24%	50	0.64%	55	0.73%	35	0.5%	55	0.8%	10	0.14%
African	45	0.56%	75	0.96%	40	0.53%	0	0%	0	0%	10	0.14%
Latin American	10	0.12%	25	0.32%	0	0%	20	0.28%	10	0.15%	0	0%
Middle Eastern (Note: Statistic includes total responses of "West Asian" and "Arab" under visible minority section on census.)	0	0%	0	0%	0	0%	15	0.21%	30	0.44%	35	0.51%
Other/multiracial (Note: Statistic includes total responses of "Visible minority, n.i.e." and "Multiple visible minorities" under visible minority section on census.)	20	0.25%	20	0.26%	0	0%	10	0.14%	10	0.15%	0	0%
Total responses	8,060	96.67%	7,780	96.78%	7,555	96.66%	7,060	97.26%	6,890	98.4%	6,920	98.48%
Total population	8,338	100%	8,039	100%	7,816	100%	7,259	100%	7,002	100%	7,027	100%
Note: Totals greater than 100% due to multiple origin responses.

=== Language ===
- Mother Tongue:
  - English: 6,500
  - French: 65
  - Other: 1,010

=== Religion ===
According to the 2021 census, religious groups in Castlegar included:

- Irreligion (4,875 persons or 60.5%)
- Christianity (2,855 persons or 35.4%)
- Sikhism (115 persons or 1.4%)
- Hinduism (65 persons or 0.8%)
- Buddhism (40 persons or 0.5%)
- Islam (30 persons or 0.4%)
- Judaism (10 persons or 0.1%)
- Other (70 persons or 0.9%)

== Climate ==
Castlegar has a humid continental climate (Köppen Dfb) or an inland oceanic climate (Cfb), bordering an inland warm-summer mediterranean climate (Köppen Csb). Summers are warm and sunny, with late summer being quite dry, while winters are cool and frequently unsettled. Precipitation peaks in the winter months when the Aleutian Low is strongest, and a range of precipitation is experienced, sometimes in short time periods. Castlegar is wetter than most places in the Southern Interior of BC, and the city receives around 400 mm more precipitation than nearby Kelowna, Penticton and Kamloops (which are in the drier Okanagan region of British Columbia, while Castlegar is in the Kootenay region).

The highest temperature ever recorded in Castlegar is 43.9 °C (111.0 °F) on 30 June 2021, which exceeded the previous mark of 41.1 °C (106.0 °F), recorded on 2 July 1924 and 11 July 1926. The coldest temperature ever recorded was −30.6 °C (−23.1 °F) on 30 December 1968.

Climate data for Castlegar (West Kootenay Regional Airport) Climate ID: 1141455; coordinates 49°17′47″N 117°37′57″W; elevation: 495.6 m (1,626 ft); 1981–2010 normals, extremes 1916–present (Note: Climate data was recorded at Castlegar from July 1916 to June 1963 and at Castlegar Airport from December 1965 to present.)
Month	Jan	Feb	Mar	Apr	May	Jun	Jul	Aug	Sep	Oct	Nov	Dec	Year
Record high humidex	9.0	14.1	22.6	27.7	35.9	46.9	53.4	42.8	37.9	28.2	19.2	10.6	53.4
Record high °C (°F)	10.0 (50.0)	14.3 (57.7)	23.1 (73.6)	32.2 (90.0)	34.5 (94.1)	43.9 (111.0)	41.1 (106.0)	40.0 (104.0)	36.8 (98.2)	27.2 (81.0)	19.4 (66.9)	11.7 (53.1)	43.9 (111.0)
Mean daily maximum °C (°F)	0.5 (32.9)	3.2 (37.8)	9.4 (48.9)	15.3 (59.5)	20.0 (68.0)	23.6 (74.5)	28.1 (82.6)	28.2 (82.8)	22.0 (71.6)	12.9 (55.2)	4.7 (40.5)	0.0 (32.0)	14.0 (57.2)
Daily mean °C (°F)	−1.6 (29.1)	−0.1 (31.8)	4.4 (39.9)	8.8 (47.8)	13.3 (55.9)	16.8 (62.2)	20.2 (68.4)	20.0 (68.0)	14.7 (58.5)	8.0 (46.4)	2.1 (35.8)	−2.1 (28.2)	8.7 (47.7)
Mean daily minimum °C (°F)	−3.7 (25.3)	−3.5 (25.7)	−0.7 (30.7)	2.3 (36.1)	6.5 (43.7)	10.0 (50.0)	12.2 (54.0)	11.7 (53.1)	7.3 (45.1)	3.0 (37.4)	−0.6 (30.9)	−4.2 (24.4)	3.4 (38.1)
Record low °C (°F)	−25.7 (−14.3)	−25.0 (−13.0)	−18.3 (−0.9)	−10.0 (14.0)	−3.9 (25.0)	−1.1 (30.0)	3.3 (37.9)	0.0 (32.0)	−7.8 (18.0)	−11.3 (11.7)	−20.2 (−4.4)	−30.6 (−23.1)	−30.6 (−23.1)
Record low wind chill	−32	−33	−28	−9	−4	−7	0	0	−5	−19	−30	−42	−42
Average precipitation mm (inches)	75.5 (2.97)	51.2 (2.02)	62.9 (2.48)	59.3 (2.33)	70.3 (2.77)	72.3 (2.85)	48.1 (1.89)	30.4 (1.20)	42.4 (1.67)	51.3 (2.02)	96.7 (3.81)	90.3 (3.56)	750.9 (29.56)
Average rainfall mm (inches)	26.2 (1.03)	28.1 (1.11)	50.1 (1.97)	57.1 (2.25)	70.1 (2.76)	72.3 (2.85)	48.1 (1.89)	30.4 (1.20)	42.4 (1.67)	49.4 (1.94)	58.7 (2.31)	31.3 (1.23)	564.3 (22.22)
Average snowfall cm (inches)	55.4 (21.8)	25.7 (10.1)	13.2 (5.2)	2.0 (0.8)	0.2 (0.1)	0 (0)	0 (0)	0 (0)	0 (0)	1.9 (0.7)	37.5 (14.8)	64.8 (25.5)	200.6 (79.0)
Average precipitation days (≥ 0.2 mm)	16.5	13.4	14.5	14.4	15.5	14.4	9.7	7.7	8.2	12.1	17.4	16.6	160.3
Average rainy days (≥ 0.2 mm)	7.8	8.1	12.4	14.2	15.5	14.4	9.7	7.7	8.2	12.0	13.0	5.7	128.5
Average snowy days (≥ 0.2 cm)	12.6	8.6	4.9	1.2	0.2	0	0	0	0	0.7	8.2	14.5	50.7
Average relative humidity (%) (at 1500 LST)	76.0	66.6	52.5	42.8	43.7	45.7	37.3	35.0	42.6	58.1	74.6	77.7	54.4
Mean monthly sunshine hours	38.9	76.1	128.8	173.8	226.7	233.0	291.9	276.3	204.0	123.2	48.2	33.4	1,854.2
Percentage possible sunshine	14.4	26.7	35.0	42.3	47.8	48.0	59.6	61.9	53.8	36.8	17.5	13.0	38.1
Source: Environment and Climate Change Canada (June maximum) (July maximum)

== Airport ==
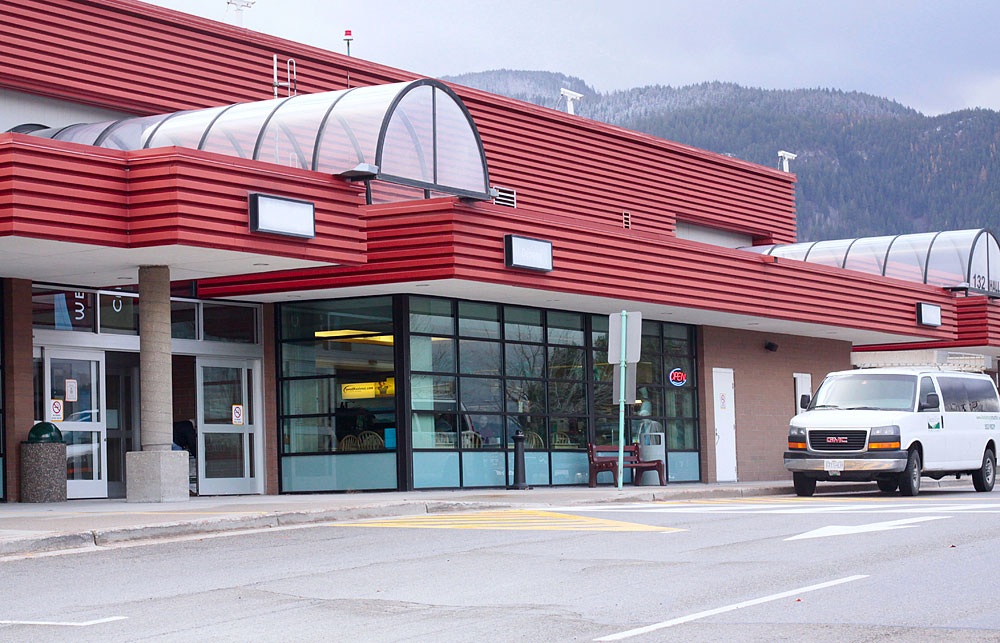
West Kootenay Regional Airport

The West Kootenay Regional Airport is owned and operated by the City of Castlegar, and provides regular service to Vancouver International Airport. The other nearest airport is Trail Airport, 40 km (25 mi) to the south.

== Schools ==
Castlegar is part of School District 20 Kootenay-Columbia. There are four elementary schools in the town:

- Castlegar Primary School
- Kinnaird Elementary School
- Robson Community School
- Twin Rivers Elementary School

There is one high school, Stanley Humphries Secondary School.

Selkirk College's main campus is also in Castlegar.

== Recreation ==
Dozens of walking trails in and near Castlegar are maintained by the Castlegar Parks and Trails Society. The area attracts retirees and tourists for its summer and winter sports.

The Columbia River flows through Castlegar. Along the river to the west are Scotties Marina and Syringa Provincial Park, with boating and camping amenities.

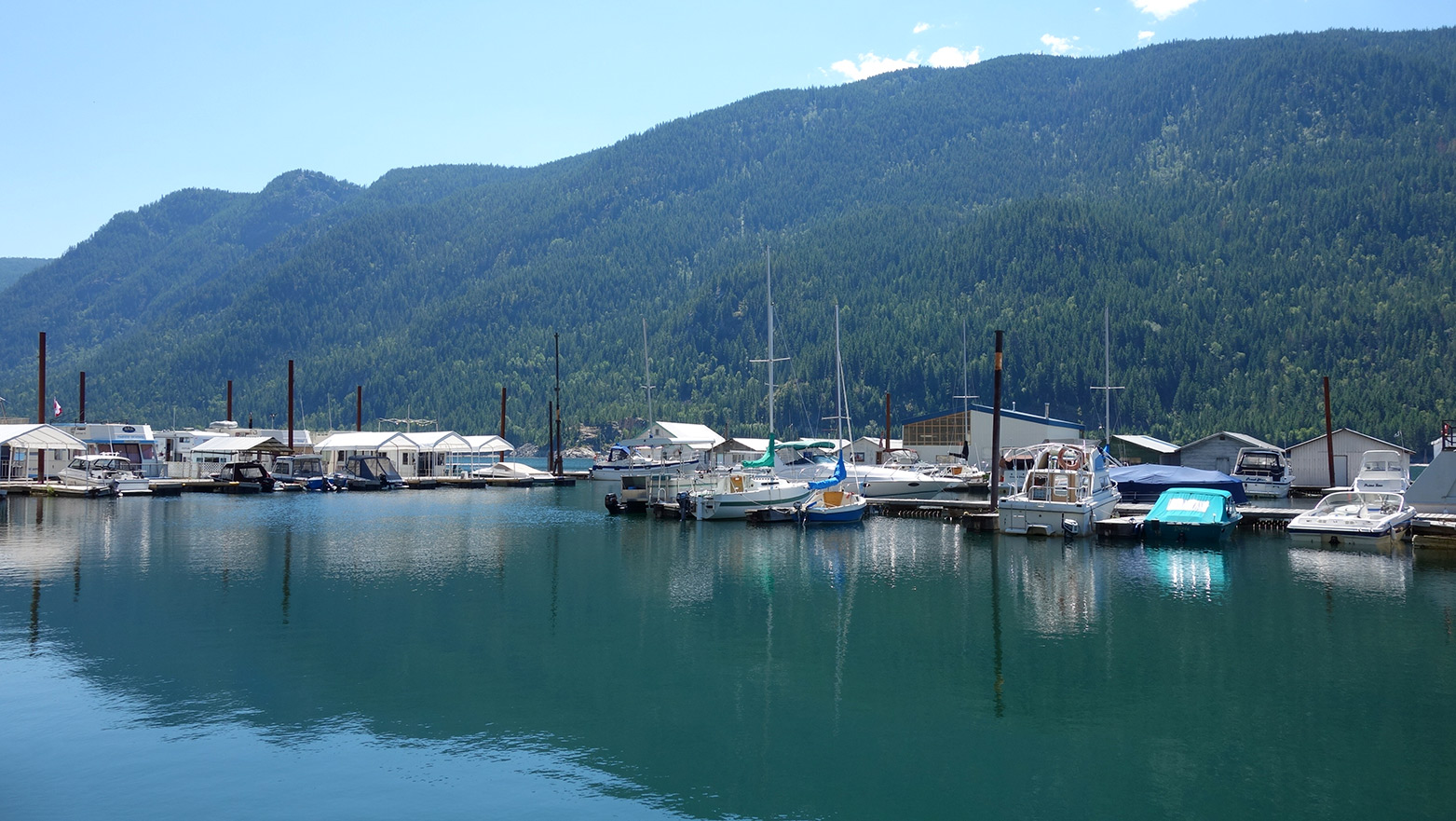
Scotties Marina, near Castlegar

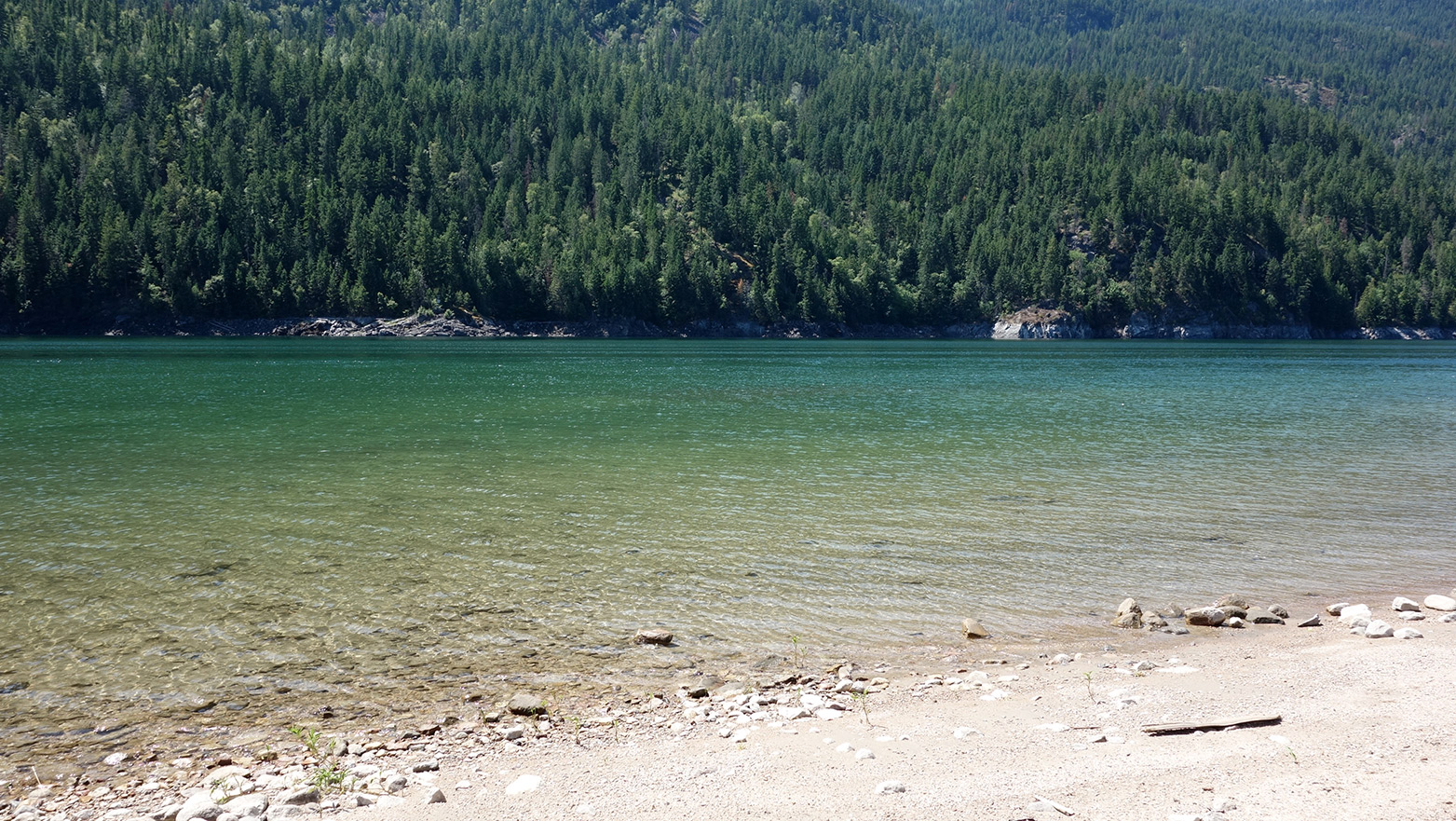
Syringa Provincial Park

== Sports ==
The city's collegiate hockey team is the Selkirk College Saints of the BCIHL, who, as of 2016, are four-time defending league champions. The Castlegar Rebels of the KIJHL are the city's Junior "B" level hockey team.

Other local sport activities include Castlegar Baseball Association, Castlegar Skating Club, Dancing at Turning Pointe Dance Studio and Scottie School of Highland Dance, Castlegar Aquanauts, Castlegar Minor Soccer Association, Selkirk Challengers Gymnastics Club, Castlegar Minor Hockey, West Kootenay Minor Football Association, the J-Hawks representing recreational basketball for the local area. Castlegar Sentinels Football Club, and the Kootenay Jiu Jitsu Academy. There are local lacrosse, golf, curling, tennis, volleyball and basketball programs. Many other fitness programs (including yoga) are offered at the Castlegar Community Complex.

Club	League	Sport	Venue	Established	Championships
Castlegar Rebels	KIJHL	Ice Hockey	Castlegar Community Complex	1976	3

== Geography ==
Castlegar's main business street, Columbia Avenue, runs the length of the city. It becomes Highway 22 at its south end, and the Robson Bridge at its north end. Most of Castlegar's local businesses are located there. There are several neighbourhoods in Castlegar, including Downtown, Southridge, Oglow Subdivision, Woodland Park, Grosvenor, Kinnaird, and Blueberry Creek. The city's outskirts include the neighbourhoods of Robson, Robson West, Brilliant, Raspberry, Pass Creek, Ootischenia, Tarrys, Thrums and Genelle.

== Transportation ==
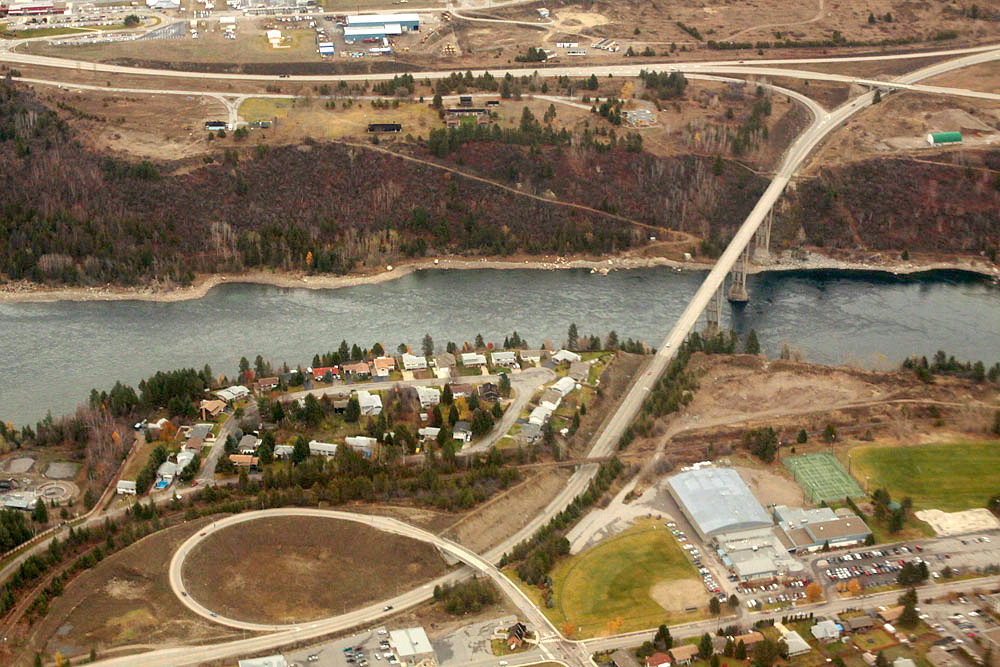
Kinnaird Bridge along Highway 3 across the Columbia River

Castlegar is a transportation hub for its region. In addition to its airport (above), it is at the junction of highways 3A, 3 and 22. Highway 22, known locally as Columbia Avenue, runs the length of the city. At its north end, Columbia meets the Robson Bridge, carrying traffic to the rural suburb of Robson, accessed via Broadwater Road.

There is a small highway interchange where the Robson Access Road meets Highway 3A towards Nelson. Highway 3 bisects Castlegar, providing the main access to the Grovesnor area, and crossing the Columbia River at the Kinnaird Bridge, to Ootischenia. Highway 3 and 3A provide routes through Ootischenia, and Highway 22 also connects to Blueberry. To the north, Highway 3A heads to Nelson. To the south, Highway 22 leads to Trail. To its east, Highway 3 leads to Salmo, and to Grand Forks to its west.

== Notable residents ==
- Felix Belczyk, former alpine skier
- Earle Connor, Paralympic amputee sprinter
- Frazey Ford, singer-songwriter
- Travis Green, retired ice hockey player, and current head coach of the Ottawa Senators
- Shawn Hook, Canadian singer/songwriter
- Shawn Horcoff, retired ice hockey player, former Edmonton Oilers captain
- Dane Jackson, retired ice hockey player
- Steve Junker, retired ice hockey player
- Doug Kostynski, retired ice hockey player
- Darcy Martini, retired ice hockey player
- Kliph Nesteroff, author
- Gordie Walker, retired ice hockey player
- Luke Walker, retired ice hockey player

== Sister cities ==
Sister cites are:

- Enbetsu, Japan
- Yueyang, China
- Stephenville, Newfoundland and Labrador
