= Wardner Provincial Park =

Provincial park in British Columbia, Canada

- IUCN category II (national park)
- Location within British Columbia
- Interactive map of Wardner Provincial Park
- Location: British Columbia, Canada
- Nearest city: Cranbrook
- Coordinates: 49°25′00″N 115°25′17″W
- Area: 0.04 km^{2} (0.015 sq mi)
- Established: May 5, 1977
- Governing body: BC Parks

Wardner Provincial Park is a provincial park in British Columbia, Canada. It is located on the edge of the Kootenay River at the border of Wardner's townsite.
