= Pilot Bay Provincial Park =

Provincial park in British Columbia, Canada

- IUCN category II (national park)
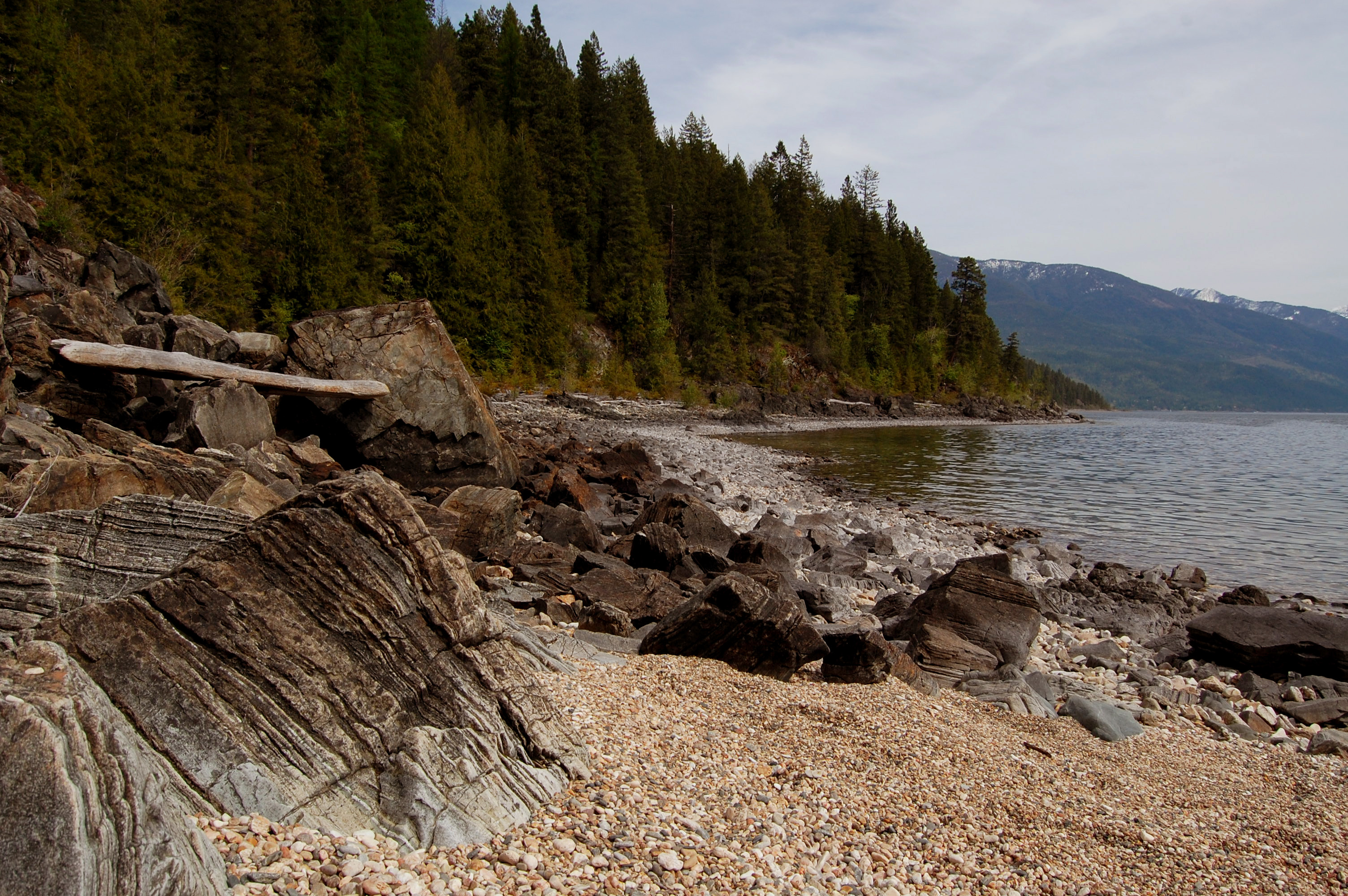
- Panoramic view

- Location within British Columbia
- Interactive map of Pilot Bay Provincial Park
- Location: British Columbia, Canada
- Nearest city: Nelson
- Coordinates: 49°38′28″N 116°51′53″W
- Area: 3.47 km^{2} (1.34 sq mi)
- Established: July 21, 1964
- Governing body: BC Parks
- Website: bcparks.ca/pilot-bay-park/

Pilot Bay Provincial Park is a provincial park in British Columbia, Canada.

The park is located on Kootenay Lake. The bay at the park is good for swimming and fishing. In the park there are many hiking tracks around and the Pilot Bay Lighthouse is nearby. The park is accessible by road. The area is 374 hectares. Drinking water is not available inside the park.
