= McDonald Creek Provincial Park =

Provincial park in British Columbia, Canada

- IUCN category II (national park)
- Location within British Columbia
- Interactive map of McDonald Creek Provincial Park
- Location: British Columbia, Canada
- Nearest city: Nakusp
- Coordinates: 50°08′24″N 117°48′59″W
- Area: 4.68 km^{2} (1.81 sq mi)
- Established: April 28, 1982
- Governing body: BC Parks

McDonald Creek Provincial Park is a provincial park in British Columbia, Canada, located 10 km south of Nakusp along Highway 6 in the Arrow Lakes region. The 468-hectare park is bisected by Upper Arrow Lake and provides beaches, a boat launch, and 73 camping spaces on the eastern shore of the reservoir. Formerly a homesteading site, the area was set aside for recreation in 1982. In 2014, the campground underwent an upgrade, including the installation of a new services including showers and additional camping spaces.
