= British Columbia Highway 3 =

Highway in British Columbia, Canada

Highway 3
- Highway 3 highlighted in red.

Route information
- Maintained by the Ministry of Transportation and Infrastructure
- Length: 838 km (521 mi)
- Existed: 1941–present
- Component highways: (1) Crowsnest Highway (2) Southern Trans-Provincial Highway (3) Southern Trans-Canada Highway

Major junctions
- West end: Highway 1 (TCH) near Hope
- Highway 5 (YH) near Hope; Highway 5A in Princeton; Highway 97 in Osoyoos; Highway 395 near Christina Lake; Highway 22 in Castlegar; Highway 6 at Salmo; Highway 21 at Creston; Highway 95 at Yahk and Cranbrook; Highway 93 at Cranbrook and Elko; Highway 43 in Sparwood
- East end: Highway 3 at Alberta border at Crowsnest Pass

Location
- Country: Canada
- Province: British Columbia
- Major cities: Greenwood, Grand Forks, Castlegar, Cranbrook, Fernie
- Towns: Princeton, Osoyoos, Creston

Highway system
- British Columbia provincial highways
← Highway 2	→ Highway 3A

British Columbia Highway 3, officially named the Crowsnest Highway, is an 841-kilometre (523 mi) highway that traverses southern British Columbia, Canada. It runs from the Trans-Canada Highway (Highway 1) at Hope to Crowsnest Pass at the Alberta border and forms the western portion of the interprovincial Crowsnest Highway that runs from Hope to Medicine Hat, Alberta. The highway is considered a Core Route of the National Highway System.

== Route description ==
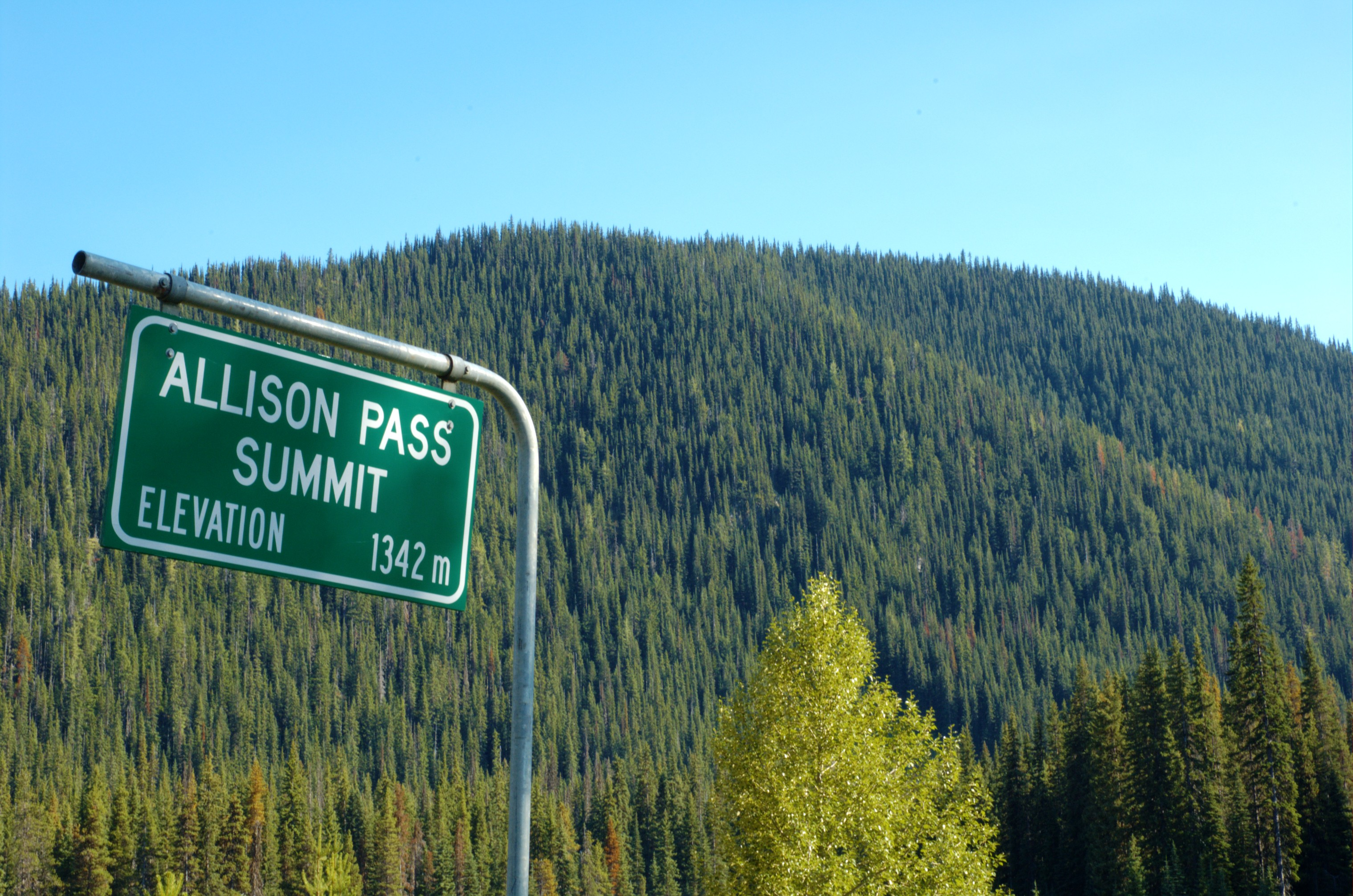
The peak of Allison Pass.

Highway 3 begins in Hope, marking the western terminus of the Crowsnest Highway. From Vancouver, the Trans-Canada Highway (Highway 1) enters Hope from the west as a four-lane freeway; however, at Exit 170, Highway 1 exits the freeway and continues north along the Fraser River to Cache Creek (as a scenic alternative and for local traffic). The freeway continues east along the Coquihalla River, designated as Highway 3 and Highway 5, for 7 km (4 mi) to Exit 177. There, the freeway turns north and continues as the Coquihalla Highway (Highway 5) towards Merritt while Highway 3 takes the exit and continues east through Manning Provincial Park for 126 km (78 mi) towards the town of Princeton. Known as the Hope–Princeton Highway, it begins several significant ascents through the Cascade Mountains; first is the steep climb to the Hope Slide, followed later by the remainder of the climb up to Allison Pass at an elevation of 1,342 metres (4,403 feet). After the summit of Allison Pass, where Highway 3 crosses from the Fraser Valley Regional District into the Regional District of Okanagan-Similkameen, the road descends for 40 miles along the Similkameen River before beginning another long climb up Sunday Summit (1,284 m (4,213 ft)). Soon after Sunday Summit is the descent into Princeton, where it meets Highway 5A.

Beyond Princeton, Highway 3 continues for 67 km (42 mi) to the southeast through Hedley to the Village of Keremeos, where it meets Highway 3A, leading towards Penticton and Highway 97. Prior to the opening of Highway 97C in 1990, this was the primary link between the Lower Mainland and the Okanagan Valley, and still functions as the main alternative route. 46 km (29 mi) southeast of Keremeos, through Richter Pass, and Highway 3 reaches the Town of Osoyoos and a junction with Highway 97. On the east end of Osoyoos, Highway 3 crosses Osoyoos Lake before entering the Monashee Mountains, ascending Anarchist Mountain through a stretch of switchbacks. Beyond the summit of Anarchist Mountain, in the upland rural community which shares the same name, Highway 3 enters the Regional District of Kootenay Boundary and proceeds to hug the Canada–United States border.

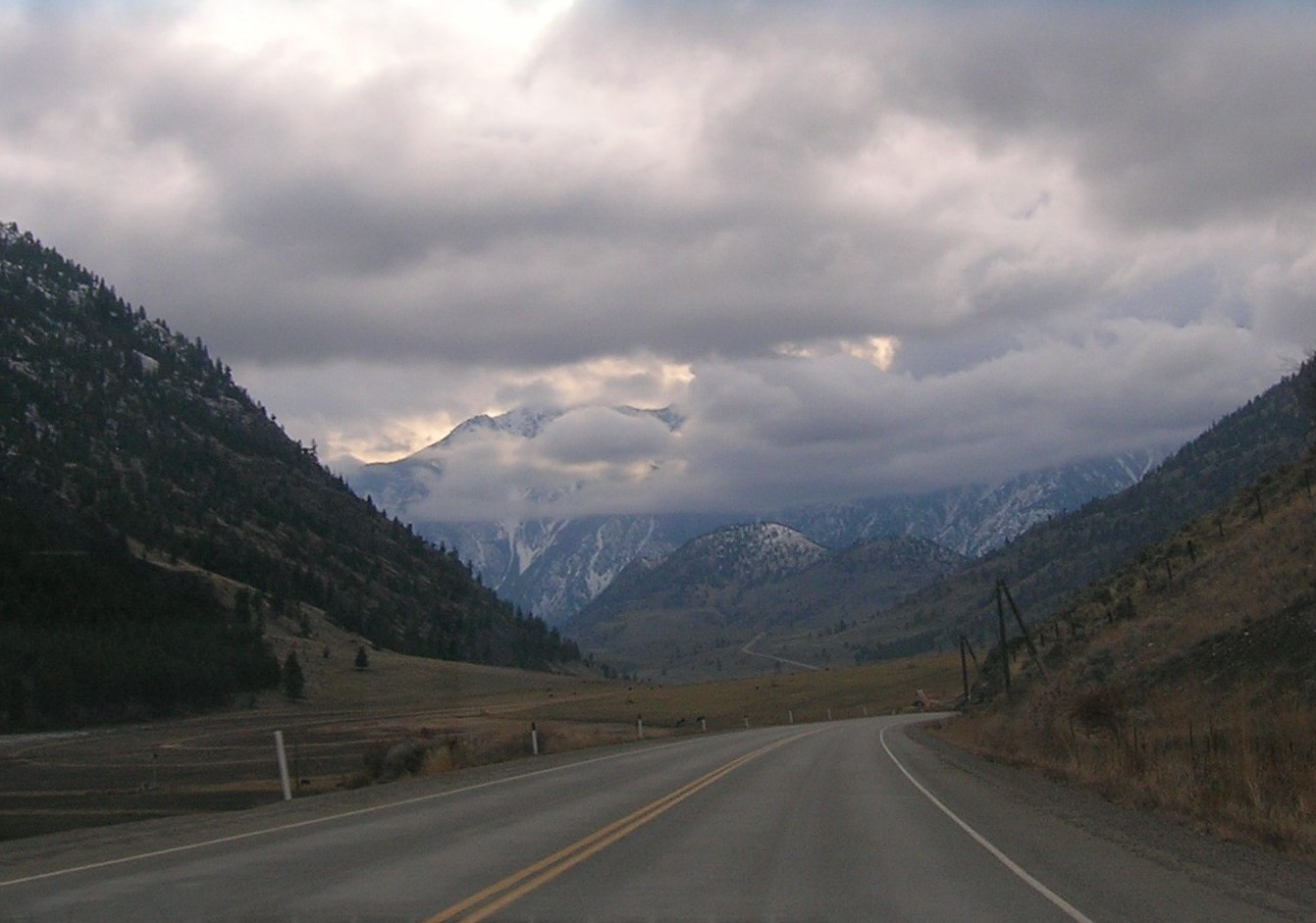
Through the Similkameen Valley westwards into the mountains

Highway 3 reaches its junction with Highway 33 at Rock Creek, 52 km (32 mi) east of Osoyoos. The highway follows the Kettle River to Midway before continuing east through Greenwood and intersecting Highway 41 at the locality of Carson, approximately 5 km (3 mi) west of Grand Forks. 21 km (13 mi) east of Grand Forks, Highway 3 meets Highway 395 at Christina Lake. East from Christina Lake, Highway 3 travels for 47 km (29 mi) through Bonanza Pass to its junction with Highway 3B at Nancy Greene Provincial Park, which is the cutoff to Rossland and Trail, passing Red Mountain Resort en route. East of Nancy Greene Lake, Highway 3 travels for 26 km (16 mi) east, crossing into the Regional District of Central Kootenay, to the City of Castlegar where Highway 3 intersects Highway 22, crosses the Columbia River, and intersects Highway 3A leading towards Nelson. 28 km (17 mi) east of Castlegar, Highway 3 reaches its eastern junction with Highway 3B. Highway 6 converges with the Highway 3 at Salmo, 11 km (7 mi) east of the Highway 3B junction, and the two highways proceed south for 14 km (9 mi) to the Burnt Flat Junction, where Highway 6 diverges south.

East of Burnt Flat, Highway 3 heads into the Selkirk Mountains and passes through the Kootenay Pass, at 1,774 m (5,820 ft) it is the highest point on the Crowsnest Highway, on a stretch known as the Kootenay Skyway, or Salmo-Creston Skyway. 69 km (43 mi) east of Burnt Flat, Highway 3 reaches the town of Creston in the Kootenay River valley, just past junctions with Highway 21 and Highway 3A. East of Creston, Highway 3 passes through the Purcell Mountains and 38 km (24 mi) later, intersects Highway 95 near Yahk. The two highways share a common alignment for 72 km (45 mi) northeast along the Moyie River, crossing into the Regional District of East Kootenay along the way, to a junction with Highway 95A in the city of Cranbrook. Another 6 km (4 mi) east is the interchange with the Highway 93 / Highway 95 concurrency, where Highway 95 diverges north and Highway 93 merges onto the Highway 3 from the north. Highway 93 and Highway 3 share a common alignment for the next 55 km (34 mi), passing through the Rocky Mountain Trench, crosses the Kootenay River, and enters the Rocky Mountains, where at Elko Highway 93 diverges south. From Elko, Highway 3 follows the Elk River for 32 km (20 mi) to Fernie, then it goes north another 29 km (18 mi) to its junction with Highway 43 at Sparwood. East of Sparwood, Highway 3 leaves the Elk River valley and travels for another 19 km (12 mi) east to Crowsnest Pass (1,382 m (4,534 ft)) on the Continental Divide, and crosses into Alberta.

== History ==
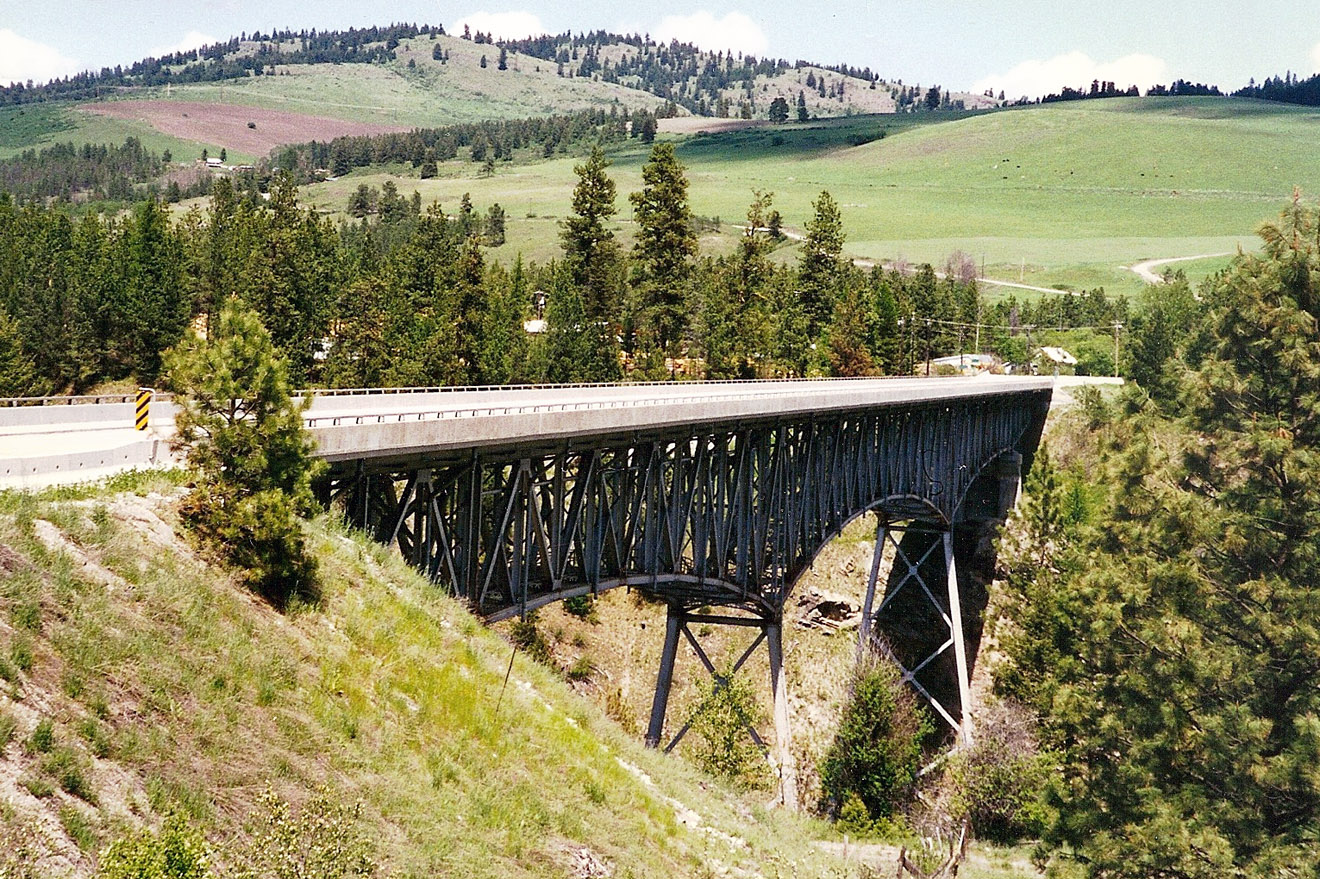
Crossing the Rock Creek Canyon Bridge between Osoyoos and Rock Creek.

Highway 3 is predated by the Dewdney Trail, a 720-kilometre (450 mi) trail used in the mid-19th century that connected the Lower Mainland to present-day Fort Steele, roughly paralleling the Canada–United States border; about 80% of the present-day highway follows the historic trail. In the early 20th century, the province began to upgrade its trails to roads, and in 1928, it was the first automobile route that connected to the Alberta border. Designated as the Southern Trans-Provincial Highway, it ran from Vancouver to Crowsnest Pass and later designated as Route 'A'; the route followed Kingsway and Yale Road from Vancouver to Hope, then turning north to Spences Bridge. The route then turned southeast and passed through Merritt and Princeton along present-day Highway 8 and Highway 5A before travelling east through Osoyoos, Grand Forks and Trail. The route included major ferry crossings at Castlegar, Nelson, and Balfour, before continuing through Creston and Cranbrook to the Alberta border.

In 1932, a more northern route following the mainline of the Canadian Pacific Railway known as the Central Trans-Provincial Highway and designated as Route 'B' was chosen as the future alignment of the Trans-Canada Highway. In 1941, British Columbia transitioned from lettered to numbered highways, with the Lower Mainland section of Route 'A' and all of Route 'B' becoming Highway 1, while the remainder of Route 'A' became Highway 3. Post-World War II, the BC government began to upgrade its highway system and on November 2, 1949, the Hope-Princeton Highway through Allison Pass and Sunday Summit was opened, reducing the highway distance from approximately 300 km (185 mi) to 135 km (85 mi). In 1954, a new highway was constructed from Trail to Salmo and was designated as Highway 3A. Highway 3A and Highway 6 shared a common alignment from Salmo to Nelson, meeting with Highway 3. On November 7, 1957, the $4 million West Arm Bridge (also known as the Nelson Bridge) was opened across the West Arm of Kootenay Lake in Nelson, replacing ferry service.

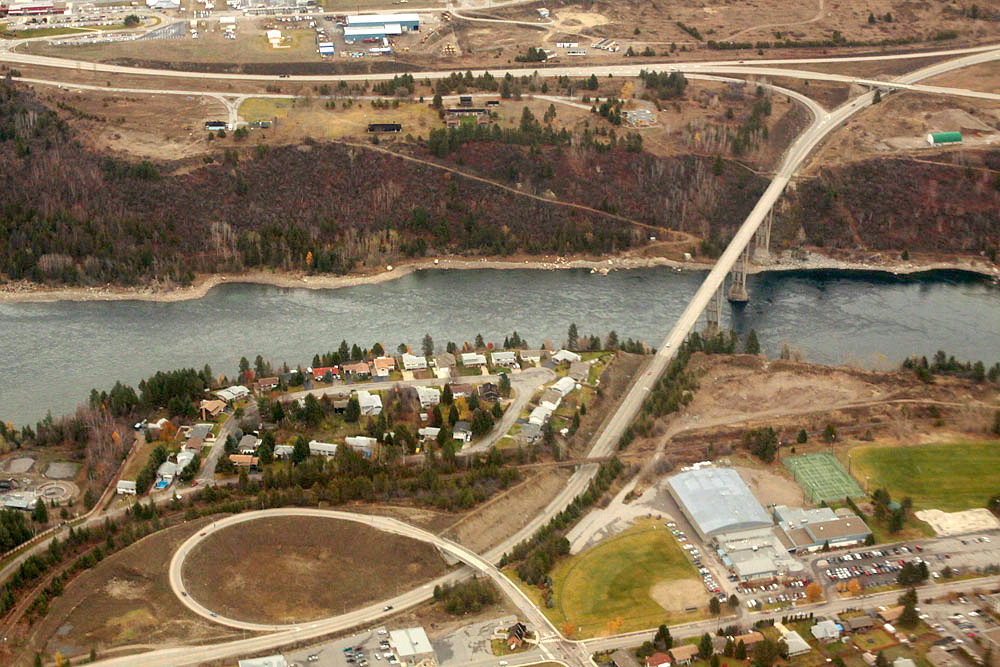
The Kinnard Bridge crossing the Columbia River in Castlegar.

The 1960s saw the construction of several major realignments and upgrades along the highway. In 1965, the Rossland-Sheep Lake Highway was completed, linking to the new Christina Lake-Castlegar section through Bonanza Pass (opened in 1962 with the completion of the Paulson Bridge), replacing a gravel mountain road that had connected Cascade City and Rossland. The Kootenay Skyway from Salmo to Creston through Kootenay Pass opened on August 15, 1964, reducing the distance from 160 km (100 mi) to 80 km (50 mi), bypassing Nelson and Kootenay Lake Ferry. As part of the Kootenay Skyway project, the bypassed section of Highway 3 became Highway 3A, while the bypassed section of Highway 3 between Trail and Castlegar became part of Highway 22. Highway 3A between Trail and Salmo, as well as the new Rossland-Sheep Lake Highway, became Highway 3B. On July 7, 1965, the Richter Pass section between Keremeos and Osoyoos opened (the bypassed section became Highway 3A), along with the Kinnaird Bridge in Castlegar, bypassing the final ferry crossing. In the morning hours of January 9, 1965, one of the largest landslides occurred in Canadian history occurred near Hope, killing four people; known as the Hope Slide. As a result, the highway had to be rerouted around and over the base of the slide's debris field. According to the B.C. MOTI, the replacement road was built a relatively short period of thirteen days. The highway built immediately after the slide has now been bypassed by a new four lane alignment to the south, which opened in 1982.

With the opening of the Trans-Canada Highway through Rogers Pass in 1962, Highway 1 became the preferred route between the Lower Mainland and Alberta. Efforts were made to promote the southern route as a more scenic alternative to the Trans-Canada Highway, beginning in the 1970s with a group from southern Alberta spearheading a proposal to rename Highway 3 in both provinces. Their efforts were successful when the route was renamed the Crowsnest Highway in 1977, with new route shields appearing a few years later. As part of the first phase of the Coquihalla Highway which opened in 1986, a 7 km (4 mi) section of the Crowsnest Highway was upgraded to a freeway, including a bypass of the old segment through Hope, which was renamed to Hope-Princeton Way.

As a result of the November 2021 Pacific Northwest floods, the Crowsnest Highway was damaged by landslides, while the Trans-Canada Highway and Coquihalla Highway had bridges that were completely washed out. Officials projected that Highway 3 would be the first of several damaged routes to reopen, and thus be the first to reconnect Canada's road network to Metro Vancouver. After this occurred, Highway 3 suffered from a high rate of crashes as it experienced volumes of truck traffic traveling at speeds faster than posted speed limits.

== Major intersections ==
Regional District	Location	km	mi	Exit	Destinations	Notes
Fraser Valley	Hope	0.00	0.00	—	Highway 1 (TCH) west – Vancouver	Freeway and exit numbers continue west
Fraser Valley	Hope	0.00	0.00	170	Highway 1 (TCH) east – Hope, Cache Creek, Prince George	Hope interchange; Highway 3 western terminus; eastbound exit and westbound entrance
Fraser Valley	Hope	0.99	0.62	171	To Highway 1 (TCH) east – Hope, Cache Creek	Westbound exit only
Fraser Valley	Hope	3.08	1.91	173	Old Hope-Princeton Way (Highway 901:0694 west) – Hope	Thacker Creek interchange; no westbound entrance; access from Highway 1 west
Fraser Valley		6.67	4.14	177	Highway 5 north (Coquihalla Highway) – Merritt, Kamloops, Kelowna	Othello interchange; Highway 3 exits freeway; exit numbers continue on Highway 5
Fraser Valley–Okanagan-Similkameen boundary	Manning Park	58.02	36.05	Allison Pass – el. 1,342 m (4,403 ft)		
Okanagan-Similkameen		99.77	61.99	Sunday Summit – el. 1,284 m (4,213 ft)		
Okanagan-Similkameen	Princeton	133.93	83.22		Highway 5A north – Merritt, Kamloops	
Okanagan-Similkameen	Keremeos	201.11	124.96		Highway 3A north – Penticton	
Okanagan-Similkameen		225.63	140.20		Nighthawk Road (Highway 904:1418 south) – U.S. Border (Chopaka), Nighthawk USA	
Okanagan-Similkameen	Osoyoos	247.11	153.55		Highway 97 – Oliver, Penticton, U.S. Border (Osoyoos), Oroville	To US 97
Okanagan-Similkameen	Osoyoos	248.80	154.60		Osoyoos Trestle Bridge across Osoyoos Lake	
Kootenay Boundary		287.81	178.84		Anarchist Summit – el. 1,233 m (4,045 ft)	
Kootenay Boundary	Rock Creek	299.12	185.86		Highway 33 north – Kelowna	
Kootenay Boundary	Midway	318.26	197.76		Florence Street (Highway 904:1321 south) – U.S. Border (Midway)	
Kootenay Boundary	Greenwood	330.28– 333.72	205.23– 207.36		Passes through Greenwood	
Kootenay Boundary		368.53	228.99		Highway 41 south – U.S. Border (Carson)	To SR 21
Kootenay Boundary	Grand Forks	371.13– 376.00	230.61– 233.64		Passes through Grand Forks	
Kootenay Boundary	Christina Lake	392.10	243.64		Highway 395 south – U.S. Border (Cascade), Spokane	To US 395
Kootenay Boundary		406.39	252.52		Bonanza Pass – el. 1,535 m (5,036 ft)	
Kootenay Boundary		441.53	274.35		Highway 3B east – Rossland, Trail	
Central Kootenay	Castlegar	467.95– 468.15	290.77– 290.89		Highway 22 south / Columbia Avenue – Castlegar, Trail	Kinnaird interchange
Central Kootenay	Castlegar	468.78	291.29		Kinnaird Bridge crosses Columbia River	
Central Kootenay	Castlegar	469.21	291.55		Highway 3A east – Airport, Nelson	Ootischenia interchange
Central Kootenay		495.67	308.00		Highway 3B east – Trail, Rossland	
Central Kootenay	Salmo	506.07	314.46		Highway 6 north / International Selkirk Loop north – Nelson	Western end of Highway 6 concurrency
Central Kootenay		520.23	323.26		Highway 6 south / International Selkirk Loop south – U.S. Border (Nelway), Spokane	To SR 31; eastern end of Highway 6 concurrency
Central Kootenay		543.27	337.57		Kootenay Pass – el. 1,774 m (5,820 ft)	
Central Kootenay		582.34	361.85		Crosses the Kootenay River	
Central Kootenay	Creston	585.08	363.55		Highway 21 south / International Selkirk Loop south – U.S. Border (Rykerts)	To SH-1
Central Kootenay	Creston	586.50	364.43		Highway 3A north / International Selkirk Loop north – Kootenay Lake Ferry	
Central Kootenay	Yahk	626.59	389.34		Highway 95 south – U.S. Border (Kingsgate), Coeur d'Alene	To US 95; western end of Highway 95 concurrency
East Kootenay	Cranbrook	692.53– 698.91	430.32– 434.28		Passes through Cranbrook	
East Kootenay	Cranbrook	698.91	434.28		Highway 95A north – Airport, Kimberley	Cranbrook interchange
East Kootenay		704.34	437.66		Highway 93 north / Highway 95 north – Fort Steele, Invermere, Radium Hot Springs	Fort Steele interchange; eastern end of Highway 95 concurrency; western end of Highway 93 concurrency
East Kootenay	Wardner	730.34	453.81		Wardner Bridge across Kootenay River	
East Kootenay	Wardner	730.81	454.10		Wardner Fort Steele Road (Highway 903:1455 north) – Fort Steele	
East Kootenay	Elko	760.08	472.29		Highway 93 south – U.S. Border (Roosville), Eureka, Missoula	To US 93; eastern end of Highway 93 concurrency
East Kootenay		772.00	479.70		Elko Tunnel	
East Kootenay	Fernie	791.04– 793.05	491.53– 492.78		Passes through Fernie	
East Kootenay	Sparwood	821.89	510.70		Highway 43 north – Elkford	
East Kootenay		841.29	522.75		Crowsnest Pass (Continental Divide) – el. 1,358 m (4,455 ft)	
East Kootenay		841.29	522.75		Highway 3 east (Crowsnest Highway) – Crowsnest Pass, Fort Macleod, Lethbridge	Continuation into Alberta
1.000 mi = 1.609 km; 1.000 km = 0.621 mi: Concurrency terminus; Incomplete access; Route transition

== See also ==
- Dewdney Trail
- Kettle Valley Railway (southern mainline of the CPR)
