= Anarchist Protected Area =

Protected area in British Columbia, Canada

Coordinates: 49.057°N 119.415°W

- IUCN category II (national park)
- Interactive map of Anarchist Protected Area
- Nearest city: Osoyoos, British Columbia
- Area: 467 ha (1,150 acres)
- Established: April 18, 2001

Anarchist Protected Area is a 467-hectare (1,150-acre) park in British Columbia, Canada, with limited public access. It was established by BC Parks to increase the representation of low-elevation Douglas fir and ponderosa pine forests in the provincial protected area system. It is named after the nearby Anarchist Mountain.
