= Sunday Summit =

Highway summit in British Columbia, Canada

- Location within British Columbia
- Elevation: 1,284 m (4,213 ft)
- Traversed by: Highway 3 (Crowsnest Highway)

Third Approach
- Location: British Columbia, Canada
- Range: Canadian Cascades
- Coordinates: 49.2389°N 120.5619°W
- Topo map: NTS 92H2 Manning Park

Sunday Summit (el. 1,284 m or 4,213 ft) is a highway summit along the Crowsnest Highway in British Columbia, Canada. It is the second-highest point on the section of the Crowsnest Highway between the cities of Hope and Princeton - the highest being Allison Pass, located to the west. It is located 15km northeast of the eastern boundary to Manning Park. There is a brake check located at the summit.
