= Kootenay Pass =

Mountain pass in British Columbia, Canada

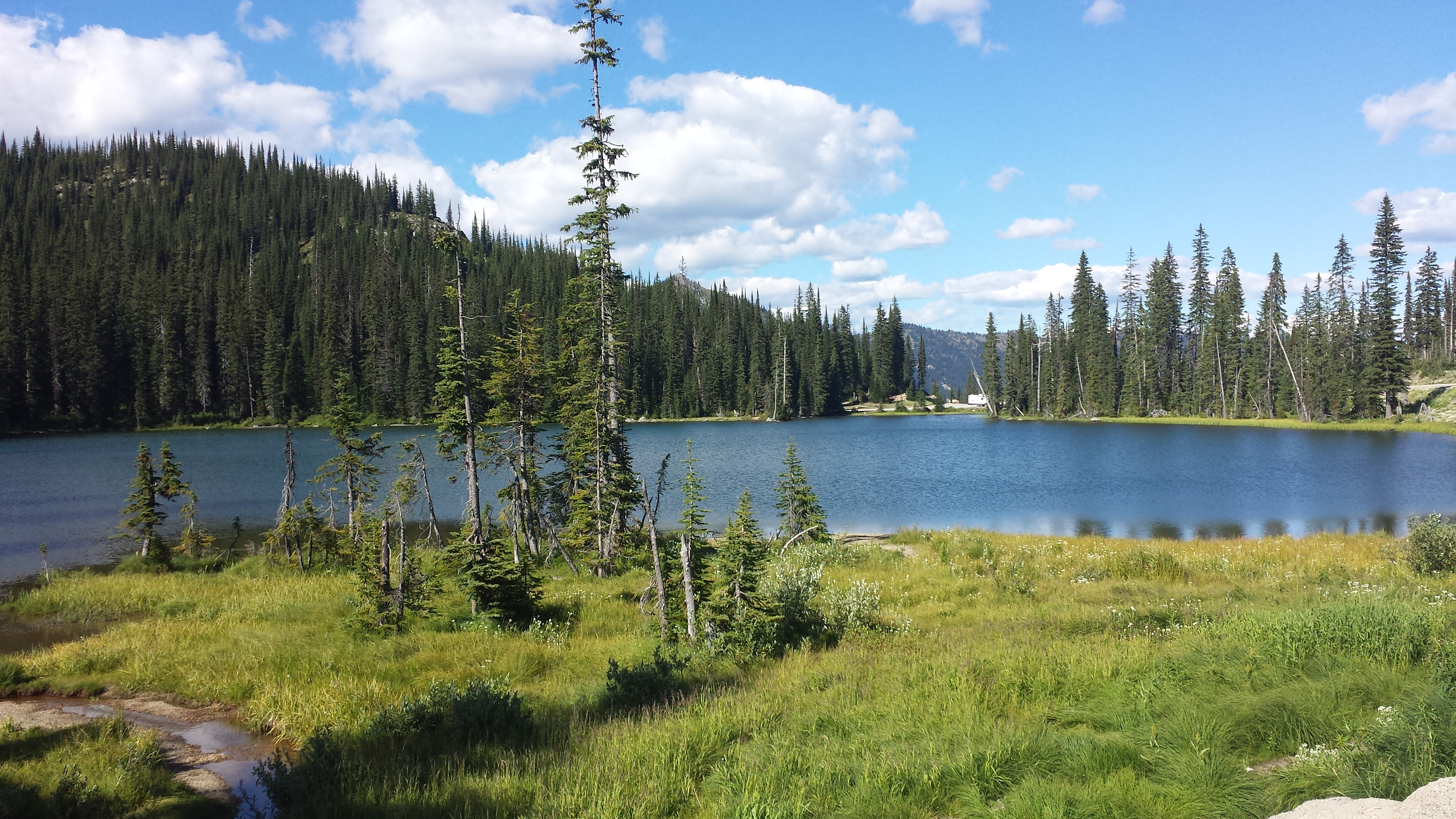
- Bridal Lake at Kootenay Pass

- Location within British Columbia
- Elevation: 1,775 metres (5,823 ft)
- Traversed by: Highway 3 (Crowsnest Highway)

Third Approach
- Location: British Columbia, Canada
- Range: Selkirk Mountains
- Coordinates: 49°3′29″N 117°2′31″W
- Topo map: NTS 82F3 Salmo

Kootenay Pass, known locally as "the Salmo–Creston" is a mountain pass in the Selkirk Mountains of British Columbia, Canada. The pass summit divides the drainage basin of the Pend d'Oreille River on the west (via tributaries Stagleap Creek, the South Salmo River and the Salmo River) from that of Kootenay River/Kootenay Lake to the east (via tributary Summit Creek). It is used by the Crowsnest Highway to transverse the Selkirks, connecting the communities of Salmo and Creston. At its opening the highway route was also dubbed the Kootenay Skyway.

The pass summit is located within Stagleap Provincial Park near Bridal Lake. A webcam operates year-round showing the current conditions of the pass.

The Kootenay Pass is one of the highest highway-served passes in Canada that is open year-round, although it is frequently closed in bad weather for avalanche control and clearing of debris. Bow Summit on the Icefields Parkway in Banff National Park, Alberta, is higher at 2,088 m (6,850 ft). Highwood Pass in Kananaskis Country, Alberta, is even higher at 2,206 m (7,238 ft), but it is traversed by Highway 40, which closes from December 1 to June 15 every year.

== Avalanche control ==
Most avalanche control at Kootenay Pass is done by a Gazex system that allows avalanche technicians to trigger avalanches remotely from the comfort of their office at the summit, visible from the summit webcam. This Gazex system has allowed for the removal of large artillery stations that were used to fire ballistic shells into start zones. On occasion, artillery shells would not explode and had to be found and destroyed during summer months with considerable expense and danger.

== Gallery ==
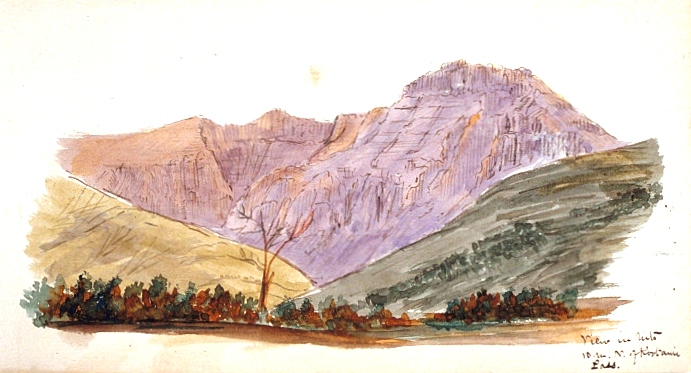
View in mountains 10 mi (16 km) north of Kootenay Pass, George Dawson 1862–1863
