= Richter Pass =

Mountain pass to the south of the summit of British Columbia highway 3

- Location within British Columbia
- Elevation: 650 m (2,130 ft)

Third Approach
- Location: British Columbia, Canada
- Coordinates: 49°04′00″N 119°35′00″W
- Topo map: NTS 82E4 Keremeos

Richter Pass is a mountain pass to the south of the summit of British Columbia Highway 3 (the Crowsnest Highway) between Keremeos (W) and Osoyoos (E), linking the Similkameen Valley with the South Okanagan over the southernmost end of the Thompson Plateau. The pass is traversed by Old Richter Pass Road and is ~650 m (2,130 ft) in elevation though the name is generally used for the route of Highway 3 as well.

The pass was named in association nearby Richter Mountain, which was named for Francis Xavier Richter, an early cattle rancher and orchardist in the area, who settled in the region during the days of the Colony of British Columbia., originally working for the Hudson's Bay Company post in Keremeos, taking care of their packhorses. His descendants still own the Richter Ranch, which spans the mountain rangeland in this area.
