= Osoyoos Times =

Canadian newspaper in British Columbia

- Type: Daily newspaper
- Founder(s): Stan Stodola
- Editor: Vanessa Broadbent
- Founded: 1947
- Language: English
- Headquarters: Osoyoos, British Columbia, Canada
- Circulation: 2,000 (as of 2022)
- Website: osoyoostimes.com

The Osoyoos Times is a local newspaper based in Osoyoos, British Columbia, Canada, It was founded in 1947 by Stan Stodola, with the motto of the newspaper being "delivering [sic] the community's news since 1947." Osoyoos Times is headquartered at 8712 Main Street.

Controversy has come from the Osoyoos Times, however. Lacey had been consuming beer at a local pub and was challenged by a police officer, which led to Lacey writing offensive comments regarding the officer in his Osoyoos Times article. The Royal Canadian Mounted Police (RCMP) claimed that the officer made the correct decision, and proposed that footage of the incident be shown to the people of the Osoyoos town.

In May 2020 the Osoyoos Times and Oliver Chronicle merged to become the Times Chronicle.

== Controversy ==
In February 2012, two months after the start of his career with the Osoyoos Times, editor Keith Lacey was driving home after an evening at a local pub and was challenged by a police officer. Lacey complied with the officer's request to do a roadside test to ensure he was not impaired. Lacey stated he was "humiliated", and in his Osoyoos Times article, wrote that the officer had "harassed" and "intimidated" him, "abused his position of authority," and treated him as a criminal; the officer was mentioned nine times in his newspaper article. However, the officer in question carried a photo in his duty bag of a young girl who was killed by a drunk driver.

According to the Royal Canadian Mounted Police (RCMP), his expressions were very "serious" and had cast the officer, as well as the RCMP, in a negative light. The RCMP stated it believed the officer had made the correct decision. The constable's dashboard camera recorded the incident, which the RCMP proposed making public to refute Lacey's claims, by either posting it on the official website of the Osoyoos Times or by the RCMP presenting the video in Osoyoos itself. Lacey responded by saying, "what I wrote is the truth," adding he had no problem with the video being shown to the public.

According to Lacey, the editorial served its purpose, and he was not "intoxicated" during the writing of it. Lacey said he has never had a problem with the police during his career. The editor later apologized, however, despite previously assuring the newspaper would not be writing one. He wrote, "I realize I let emotion get the better of me, which I sincerely regret", having posted the apologies on the Osoyoos Times' official website. Lacey also assured that his newspaper would be writing a retraction to the original editorial, and admitted that losing his job with the newspaper was a possibility. He admittedly claimed that the officer had not humiliated or embarrassed him at the time, and was just doing his job, properly. The RCMP agreed not to charge the editor over the incident.

== See also ==
- List of newspapers in Canada
