= British Columbia Highway 43 =

Highway in British Columbia

Highway 43
- Elk Valley Highway
- Highway 43 highlighted in red

Route information
- Maintained by the Ministry of Transportation and Infrastructure
- Length: 34.85 km (21.65 mi)
- Existed: 1983–present

Major junctions
- South end: Highway 3 in Sparwood
- North end: Elkford

Location
- Country: Canada
- Province: British Columbia

Highway system
- British Columbia provincial highways
← Highway 41	→ Highway 49

Highway 43, the Elk Valley Highway, is the easternmost spur off of the British Columbia segment of the Crowsnest Highway (Highway 3), in the Regional District of East Kootenay. The highway, which is two lanes, starts in Sparwood, and travels 35 km (22 mi) north along the Elk River to the community of Elkford, where a connection to Elk Lakes Provincial Park, on the border with Alberta, is located. The route received its designation in 1983, and it has not been re-aligned.

== Major intersections ==
The entire route is in East Kootenay Regional District.

Location	km	mi	Destinations	Notes
Sparwood	0.00	0.00	Highway 3 (Crowsnest Highway) – Lethbridge, Fernie, Cranbrook	Southern terminus
Elkford	34.85	21.65	Fording Mine Road (Highway 903:1399 north) / Alpine Way	
Elkford	34.85	21.65	Galbraith Drive	Northern terminus; continues as Elk River Forestry Service Road
1.000 mi = 1.609 km; 1.000 km = 0.621 mi
