= Oroville–Osoyoos Border Crossing =

Border crossing between Canada and the United States

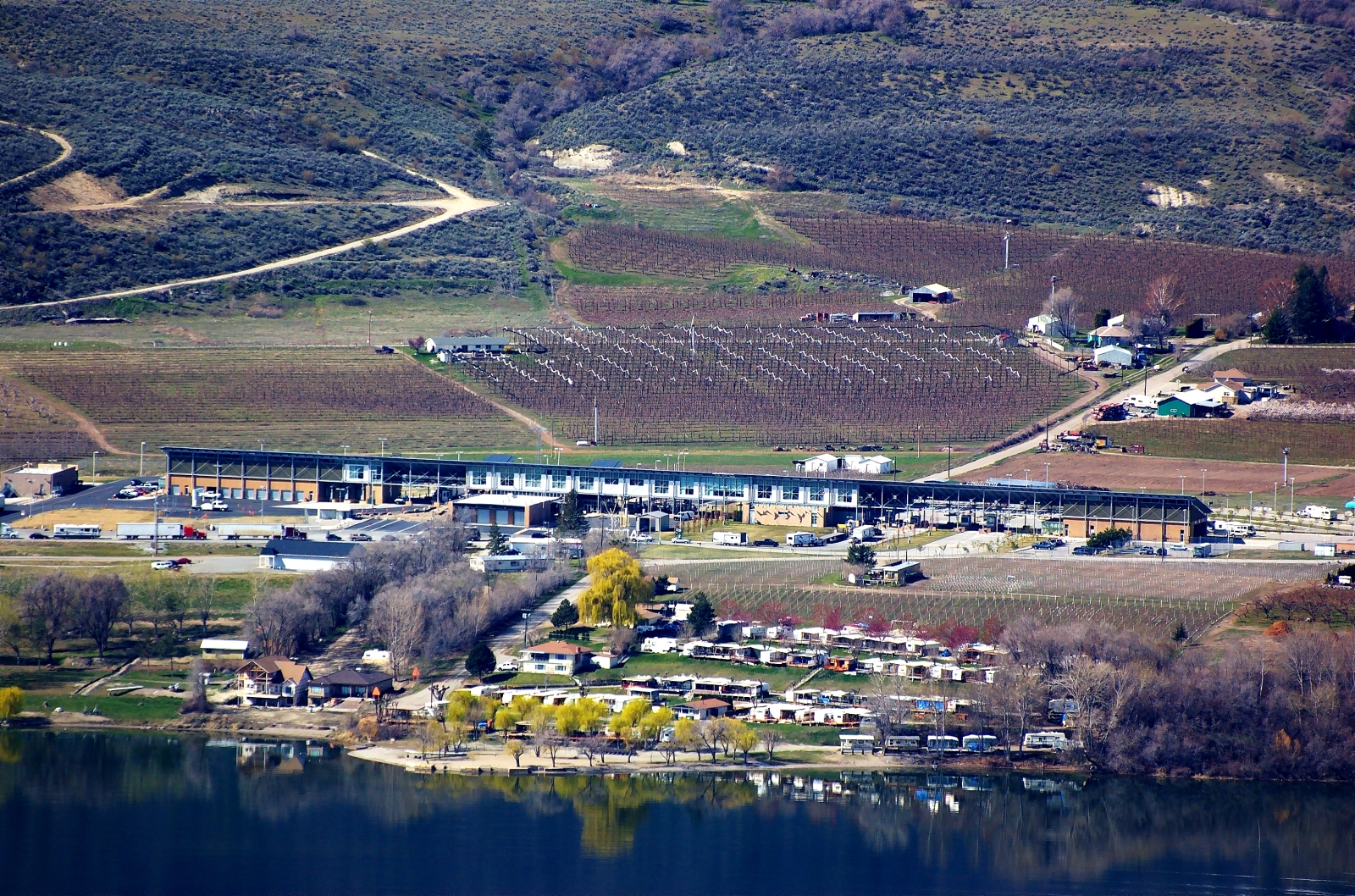
- Aerial view of the US-Canada joint border station in 2010. Canada is to the right.

Location
- Country: United States; Canada
- Location: US 97 / Highway 97; US Port: 33643 Hwy 97, Oroville, WA 98844; Canadian Port: 202 97th Street, Osoyoos, BC V0H 1V1
- Coordinates: 49°00′00″N 119°27′42″W

Details
- Opened: 1861

Website
- US Canadian

The Oroville–Osoyoos Border Crossing connects the city of Oroville, Washington and the town of Osoyoos, British Columbia on the Canada–US border. U.S. Route 97 on the American side joins British Columbia Highway 97 on the Canadian side.

== Canadian side ==
The first cattle drive crossing at Osoyoos was in 1858.

John Carmichael Haynes was the inaugural customs officer 1861–1888 until his death. Initially on the lower Similkameen River, the customs office relocated to the west shore at the north end of Osoyoos Lake within months. The building was physically moved to the village of Osoyoos in 1865. After the structure burned down in 1878, Haynes operated out of his residence.

Administrative oversight transferred from the Port of Victoria to the Port of New Westminster in 1880 and to the Port of Grand Forks in 1899. The office closed in 1902 but reopened in 1905. Oversight passed to the Port of Greenwood in 1907 and the Port of Penticton in 1924. The status was upgraded to Port of Osoyoos in 1948.

In 1940, an RCMP border patrol was established at Osoyoos.

In 2003, the US and Canada completed a US$31 million joint border inspection station which houses the agencies of both countries.

A 2015 thesis examining the security vulnerabilities of the Osoyoos Port of Entry lacks informative summary conclusions.

In 2022, protesting truck drivers seeking to end COVID-19 pandemic restrictions tied up traffic on Highway 97 and into Osoyoos before heading to the border.

The crossing was one of three crossings designated for accommodating travellers from Washington to Alaska.

== US side ==
During the 1860s, the original Dewdney Trail ran south of the border for a brief span near Oroville, but this section was soon decommissioned and a new section blazed north of the border. That decade, a rudimentary building housed the US Customs office.

The Oroville border patrol station, established in 1929, actively pursued liquor smugglers during Prohibition in the United States. On at least one occasion, officers mistakenly believed the smugglers had crossed to the US side. Consequently, the arrested individuals were released without charge at dawn. The customs building location changed several times before erection at the present site.

US agents patrol the lake, which straddles the border. Boaters can cross the border but cannot land or contact anyone without having reported to the Customs and Border Protection office. In 2003, two Canadians were apprehended after crossing under the cover of darkness in an 18-foot canoe loaded with 478 pounds of marijuana. In 2021, officers discovered and seized US$132,980 and CA$12,200 in unreported currency during a vehicle inspection.

== Gallery ==
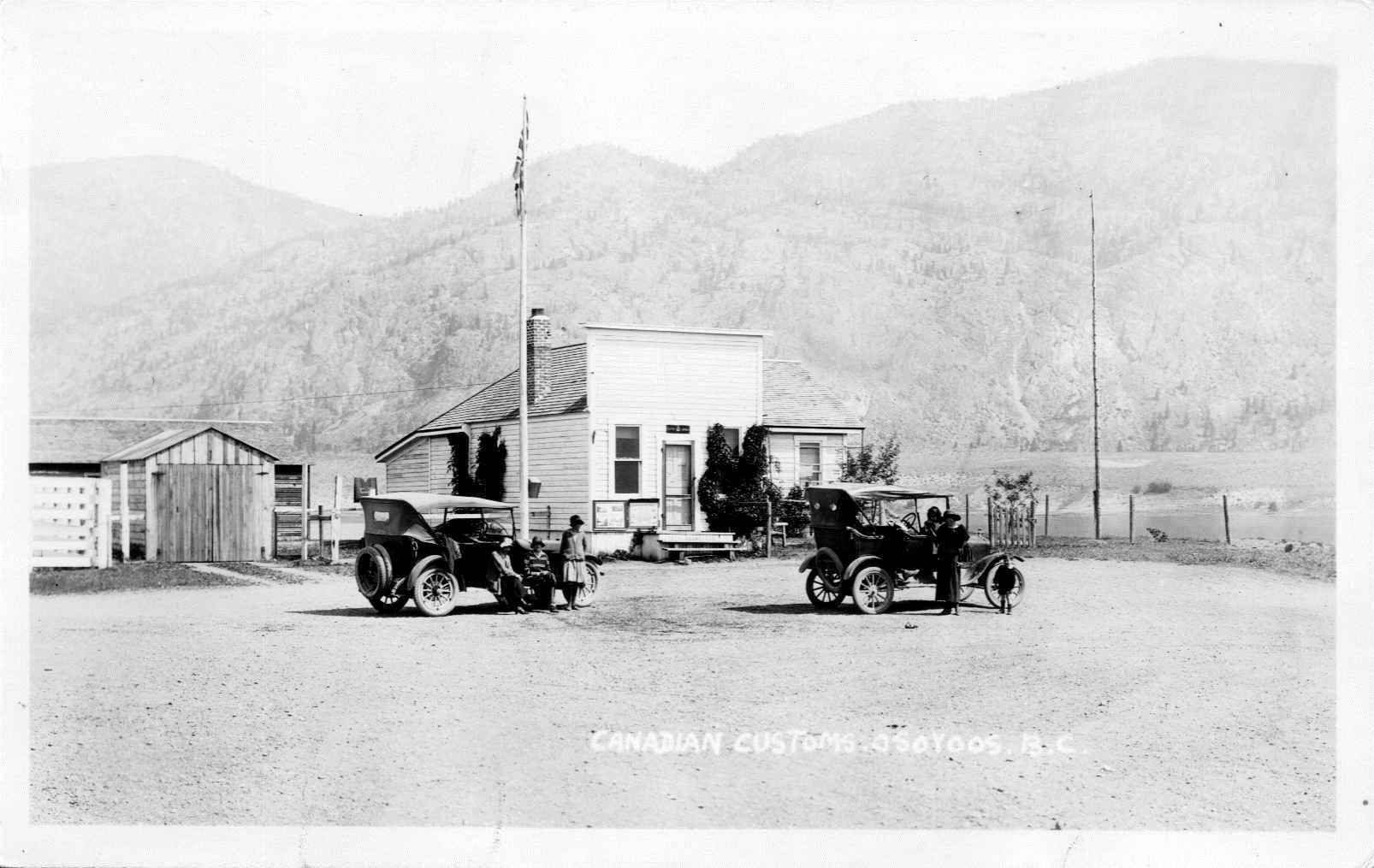
Canadian border station at Osoyoos, BC, 1922

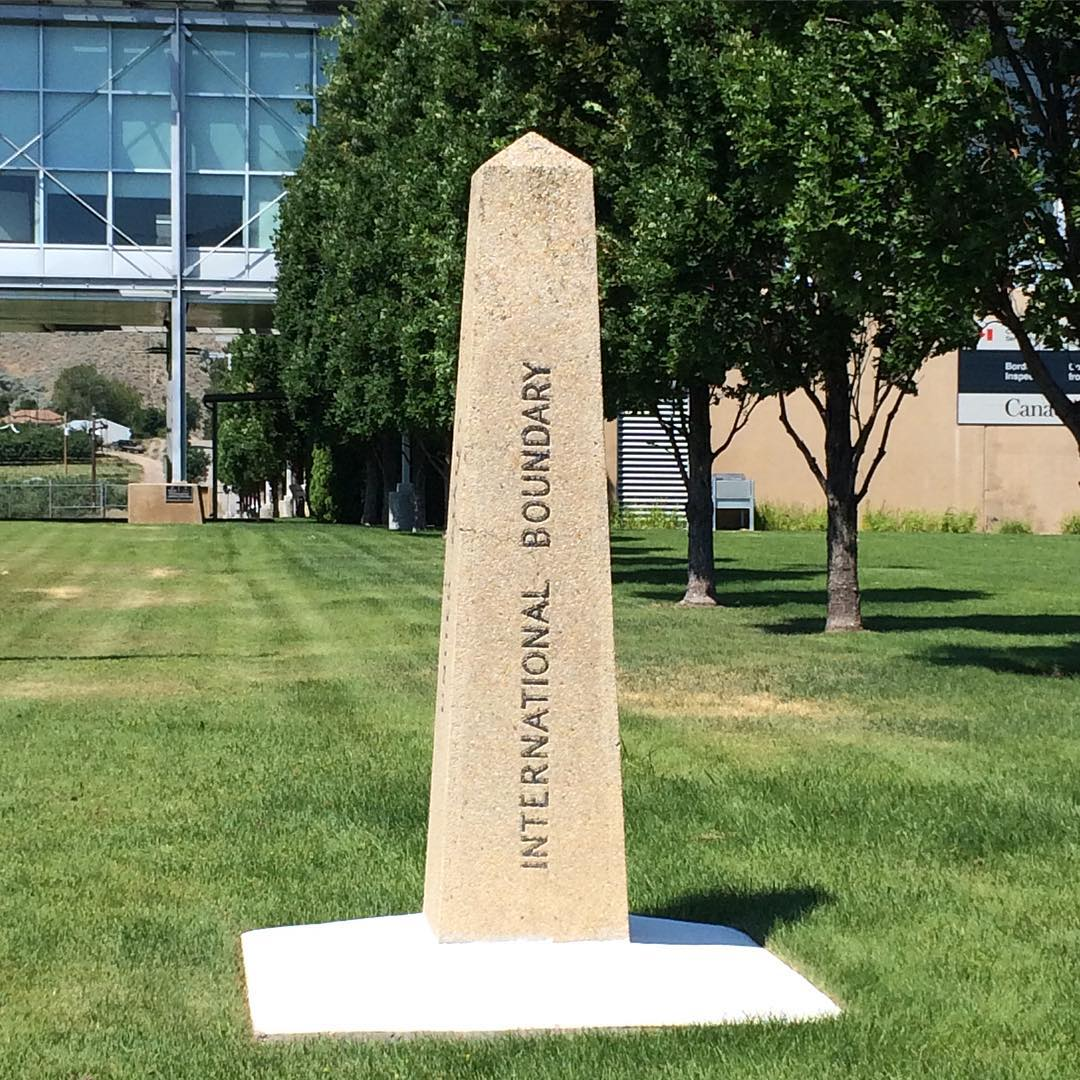
Oroville-Osoyoos border survey marker, 2015

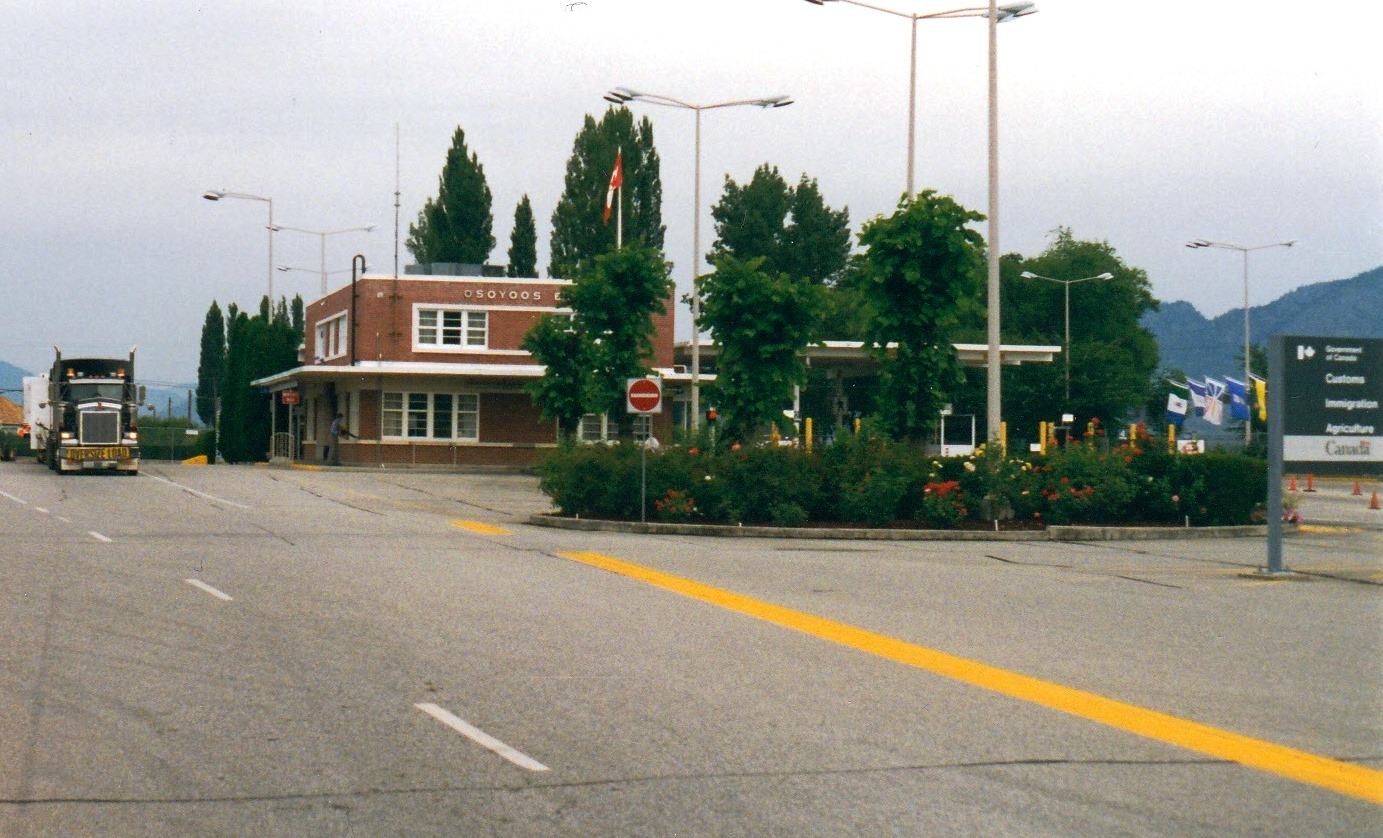
Canadian border station at Osoyoos, BC, 1997.

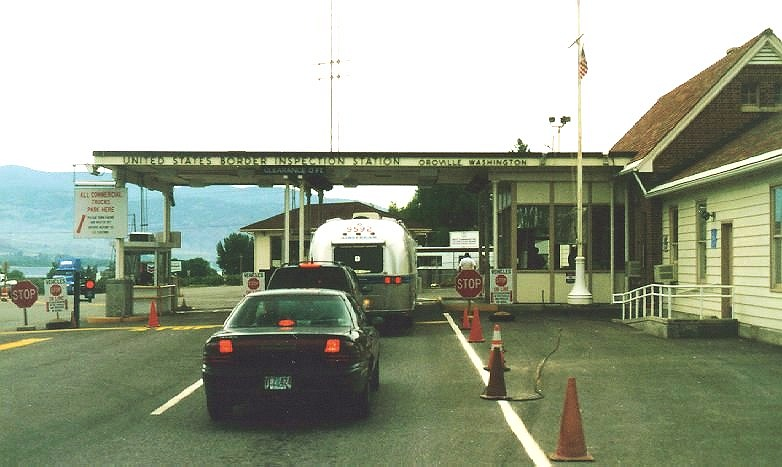
US border station at Oroville, WA, c.1990s

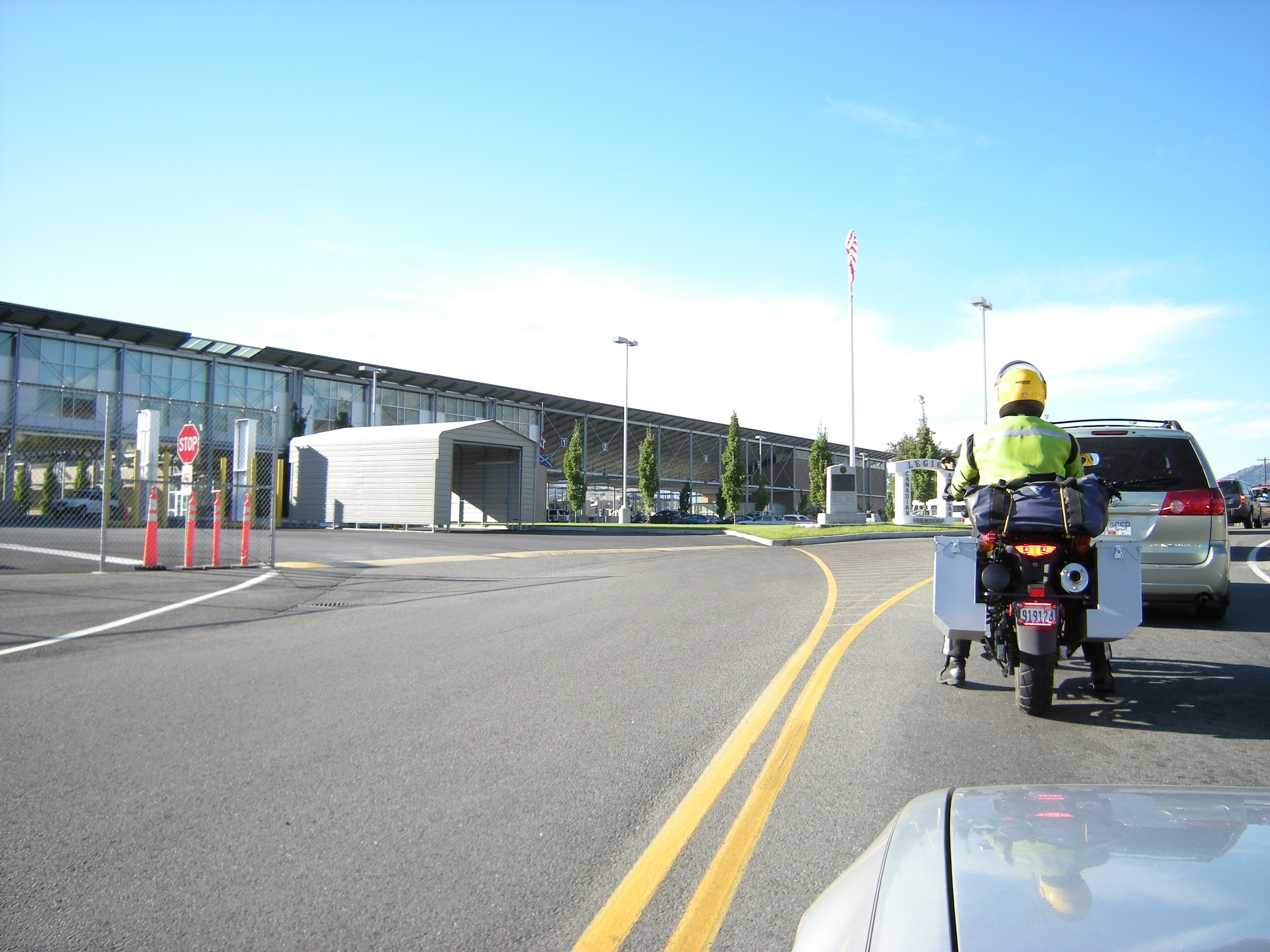
Canada border crossing at Osoyoos, BC, c.2003

== See also ==
- List of Canada–United States border crossings
