= Yahk Provincial Park =

Provincial park in British Columbia, Canada

- IUCN category II (national park)
- Location within British Columbia
- Interactive map of Yahk Provincial Park
- Location: British Columbia, Canada
- Nearest city: Yahk
- Coordinates: 49°4′49″N 116°5′44″W
- Area: 9 ha (22 acres)
- Established: 1956
- Governing body: BC Parks

Yahk Provincial Park is a provincial park located just south of Yahk, British Columbia, 70 kilometres south of Cranbrook, and 14.5 kilometres north of the Canada–United States border at Kingsgate in British Columbia, Canada.

== History ==
The park was established 1956. The area was once a major supplier of railroad ties for the Canadian Pacific Railway.

The park serves as both an introduction to British Columbia for tourists entering from the United States and a scenic day use area and camping location for travelers following the southern trans-provincial highway.

== Conservation ==
The park aims to protect a short scenic section of the Moyie River, though the primary purpose for the park is to provide camping and picnicking opportunities for the travelling public.

== Recreation ==
The park provides vehicle accessible camping, picnicking, and fishing opportunities for the travelling public. There is also the opportunity of hiking an abandoned railway grade which borders the park.
