= Regional District of Okanagan-Similkameen =

Regional district in British Columbia, Canada

Coordinates: 49°25′00″N 120°00′00″W

Okanagan-Similkameen
- Regional district
- Regional District of Okanagan-Similkameen
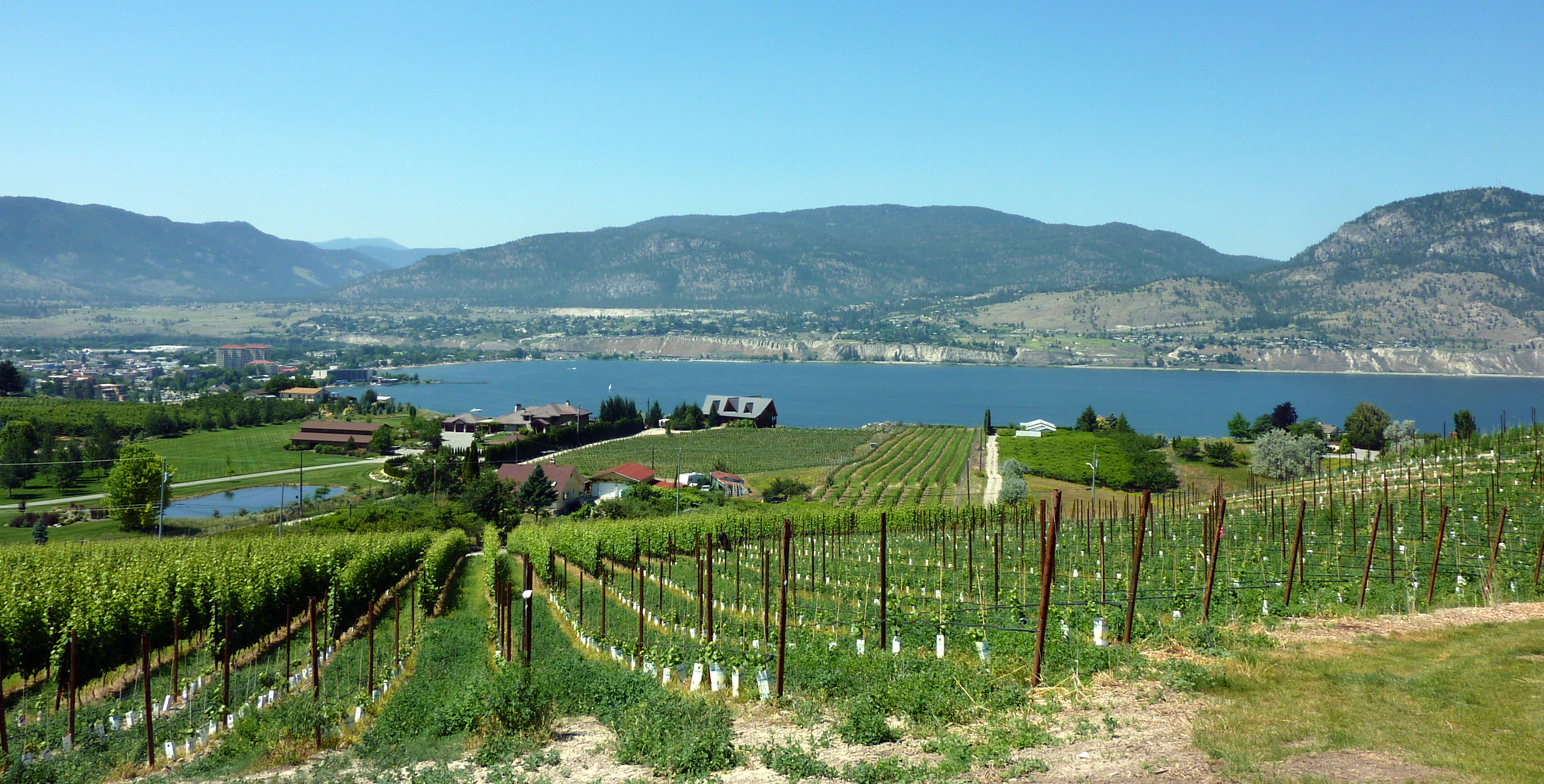
- Okanagan Lake from Naramata

- Logo

- Location in British Columbia
- Country: Canada
- Province: British Columbia
- Administrative office location: Penticton

Government
  - Type: Regional district
  - Body: Board of Directors
  - Chair: Mark Pendergraft (A)
  - Vice Chair: Campbell Watt (City of Penticton)
  - Electoral Areas: A - Osoyoos Rural; B - Cawston; C - Oliver Rural; D - Skaha East & Okanagan Falls; E - Naramata; F - Okanagan Lake West/West Bench; G - Keremeos Rural/Hedley; H - Princeton Rural; I - Skaha West, Kaleden and Apex

Area
  - Land: 10,411.68 km^{2} (4,019.97 sq mi)

Population (2021)
  - Total: 90,178
  - Density: 8.66/km^{2} (22.4/sq mi)
- Website: www.rdos.bc.ca

The Regional District of Okanagan-Similkameen (RDOS) is in southern British Columbia, adjacent to the U.S. state of Washington. It is bounded by Fraser Valley Regional District to the west, Thompson-Nicola Regional District and Regional District of Central Okanagan to the north, Regional District of Kootenay Boundary to the east, and by Okanogan County, Washington to the south. At the 2011 census the population was 80,742. The district covers a land area of 10,413.44 square kilometres (4,020.65 sq mi). The administrative offices are in Penticton.

== Population history ==
- 2021: 90,178 (+8.6%)
- 2016: 83,022 (+2.8%)
- 2011: 80,742 (+1.6%)
- 2006: 79,475 (+3.7%)
- 2001: 76,635 (+0.9%)
- 1996: 75,933

== Municipalities ==
RDOS comprises seven municipalities and nine rural electoral areas designated Electoral areas A - I. The municipalities of RDOS are Penticton, Summerland, Okanagan Falls, Osoyoos, Oliver, Princeton, and Keremeos.

Municipality	Type	Population	Growth 2016-2021
Penticton	City	36,885	9.3%
Summerland	District municipality	12,042	3.7%
Okanagan Falls	District municipality	2,266	-
Osoyoos	Town	5,556	10.0%
Oliver	Town	5,094	3.4%
Princeton	Town	2,826	3.0%
Keremeos	Village	1,608	7.1%

== Demographics ==
As a census division in the 2021 Census of Population conducted by Statistics Canada, the Regional District of Okanagan-Similkameen had a population of 90,178 living in 40,981 of its 46,436 total private dwellings, a change of 8.6% from its 2016 population of 83,022. With a land area of 10,406.64 km^{2} (4,018.03 sq mi), it had a population density of 8.7/km^{2} (22.4/sq mi) in 2021.

=== Ethnicity ===
Panethnic groups in the Okanagan–Similkameen Regional District (2001−2021)
Panethnic group	2021		2016		2011		2006		2001	
Panethnic group	Pop.	%	Pop.	%	Pop.	%	Pop.	%	Pop.	%
European (Note: Statistic includes all persons that did not make up part of a visible minority or an indigenous identity.)	73,430	83.76%	68,860	85.6%	69,095	88.14%	70,640	90.02%	69,205	91.08%
Indigenous	6,640	7.57%	6,145	7.64%	4,910	6.26%	3,380	4.31%	2,865	3.77%
South Asian	3,445	3.93%	2,950	3.67%	2,630	3.35%	2,805	3.57%	2,030	2.67%
East Asian (Note: Statistic includes total responses of "Chinese", "Korean", and "Japanese" under visible minority section on census.)	1,315	1.5%	940	1.17%	655	0.84%	780	0.99%	940	1.24%
Southeast Asian (Note: Statistic includes total responses of "Filipino" and "Southeast Asian" under visible minority section on census.)	1,205	1.37%	735	0.91%	510	0.65%	415	0.53%	380	0.5%
Latin American	590	0.67%	270	0.34%	160	0.2%	130	0.17%	365	0.48%
African	555	0.63%	240	0.3%	230	0.29%	125	0.16%	165	0.22%
Middle Eastern (Note: Statistic includes total responses of "West Asian" and "Arab" under visible minority section on census.)	185	0.21%	115	0.14%	75	0.1%	30	0.04%	30	0.04%
Other (Note: Statistic includes total responses of "Visible minority, n.i.e." and "Multiple visible minorities" under visible minority section on census.)	305	0.35%	195	0.24%	125	0.16%	160	0.2%	10	0.01%
Total responses	87,665	97.21%	80,445	96.9%	78,395	97.09%	78,475	98.74%	75,985	99.15%
Total population	90,178	100%	83,022	100%	80,742	100%	79,475	100%	76,635	100%

- Note: Totals greater than 100% due to multiple origin responses.

=== Language ===
According to the 2011 Census, 84.43% of Okanagan-Similkameen's population have English as mother tongue; German is the mother tongue of 2.99% of the population, followed by Punjabi (2.86%), French (1.90%), Portuguese (1.06%), Dutch (0.80%), Ukrainian (0.42%), Hungarian (0.41%), Spanish (0.41%), and Italian (0.39%).

Mother tongue	Population	Percentage
English	67,360	84.43%
German	2,385	2.99%
Punjabi	2,280	2.86%
French	1,515	1.90%
Portuguese	845	1.06%
Dutch	640	0.80%
Ukrainian	335	0.42%
Hungarian	330	0.41%
Spanish	330	0.41%
Italian	310	0.39%

== Electoral areas ==
Okanagan-Similkameen A
Rural areas surrounding Osoyoos, including Anarchist Mountain to the east between Rock Creek and Osoyoos.
Population: 2,139

Okanagan-Similkameen B
The valley of the Similkameen River from Cawston downstream to Chopaka, at the US border.
Population: 1,151

Okanagan-Similkameen C
Rural areas surrounding Oliver.
Population: 3,986

Okanagan-Similkameen D
Rural areas and unincorporated communities southeast of Penticton, including Okanagan Falls.
Population: 4,016

Okanagan-Similkameen E
Rural areas and unincorporated settlements to the northeast of Penticton including Naramata.
Population: 2,015

Okanagan-Similkameen F
Rural areas west of Summerland and northwest of Penticton.
Population: 2,092

Okanagan-Similkameen G
Rural areas of the middle Similkameen Valley surrounding Keremeos, including Hedley.
Population: 2,298

Okanagan-Similkameen H
Rural areas and unincorporated communities in the upper Similkameen Valley, including Tulameen and Coalmont.
Population: 2,232

Okanagan-Similkameen I
Rural areas southwest of Penticton, including Kaleden and Apex.
Population: 2,207
