= Yahk =

- Hamlet (unincorporated)
- Location within British Columbia
- Coordinates: 49°04′59″N 116°05′03″W
- Country: Canada
- Province: British Columbia
- Region: Kootenays
- Regional district: Central Kootenay

Government

Area
  - Total: 4.32 km^{2} (1.67 sq mi)

Population (2021)
  - Total: 179
  - Density: 41.4/km^{2} (107/sq mi)
- Time zone: MST
- Area codes: 250, 778, 236, & 672
- Highways: Highway 3 Highway 95

Yahk /ˈjæk/ is an unincorporated hamlet in southeastern British Columbia, Canada, just north of the Canada-U.S. border. Yahk Provincial Park borders the village to the south. Yahk is located on the Moyie River.

CBC Television talk show The Hour taped a live episode in Yahk on February 9, 2006. The show was there in part because of Kyle MacDonald, the blogger behind one red paperclip, who said in an interview with CBC News he would go anywhere to trade "except Yahk, British Columbia". He eventually relented with the catch that CBC News had to do a show from Yahk.

== See also ==
- Yaak River
