= Bonanza Pass =

Mountain pass in British Columbia, Canada

- Location within British Columbia
- Elevation: 1,535 m (5,036 ft)

Third Approach
- Location: British Columbia, Canada
- Range: Monashee Mountains
- Coordinates: 49°13′N 118°4′W
- Topo map: NTS 82E1 Grand Forks

Bonanza Pass, also known as the Blueberry-Paulson, is a mountain pass in the Monashee Mountains of British Columbia, Canada. It is utilized by the Crowsnest Highway to traverse the Monashees, and informally separates the Kootenays to the east from the Boundary Country to the west.
