= Stagleap Provincial Park =

Provincial park in Central Kootenay Regional District, British Columbia, Canada

- IUCN category II (national park)
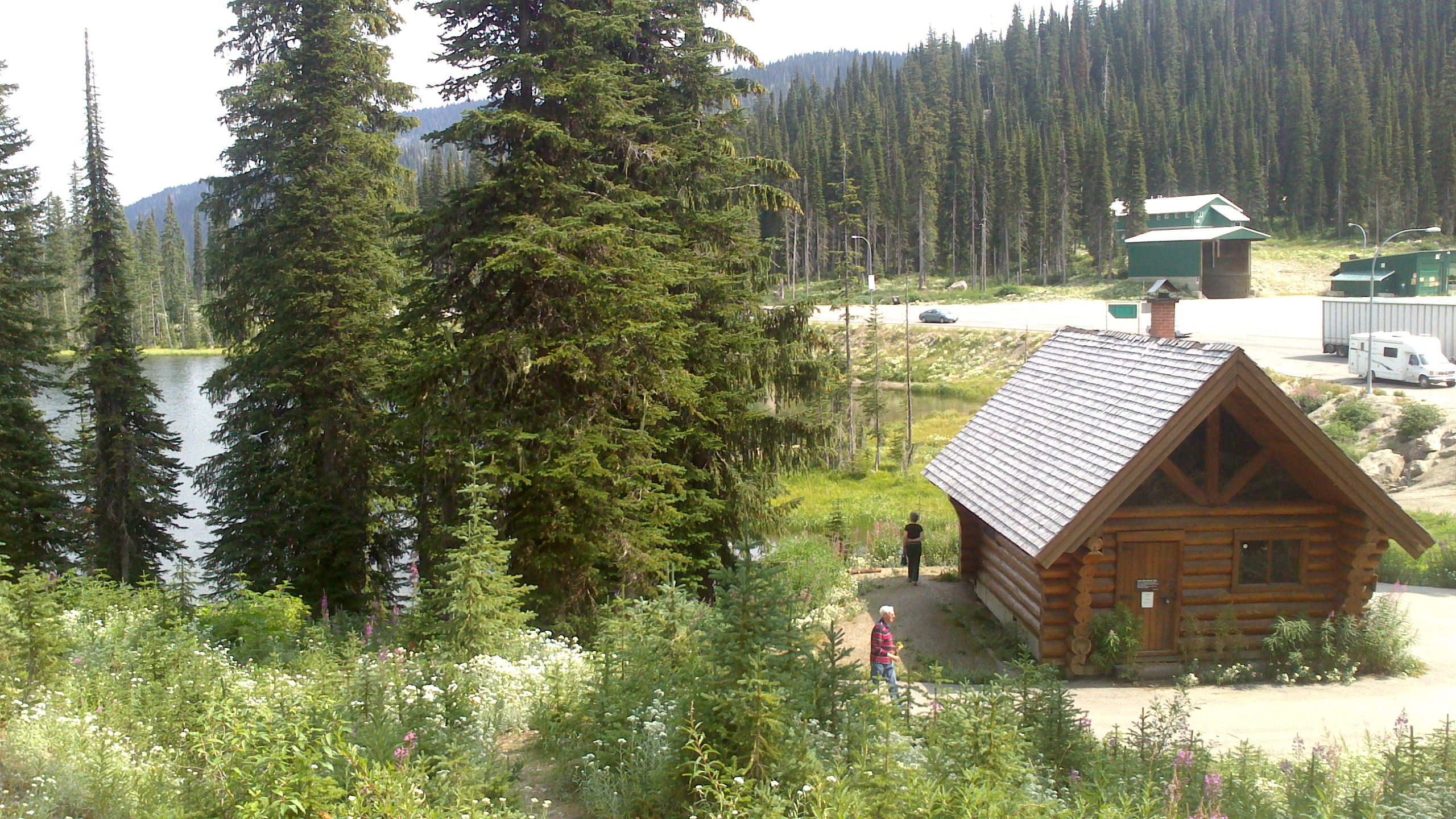
- Panoramic view

- Location within British Columbia
- Interactive map of Stagleap Provincial Park
- Location: British Columbia, Canada
- Nearest city: Creston
- Coordinates: 49°03′36″N 117°02′55″W
- Area: 11.33 km^{2} (4.37 sq mi)
- Established: August 17, 1964
- Governing body: BC Parks
- Website: bcparks.ca/stagleap-park/

Stagleap Provincial Park is a provincial park in British Columbia, Canada. The park is approximately 1133 hectares (2800 acres). It is 34 kilometres (21 mi) west of Creston.

Stagleap is a protected habitat for mountain caribou, which are an endangered species. For this reason, dogs and other domestic animals are prohibited from the park from November 1st through April 30.

== Attractions ==
- Canoeing
- Kayaking
- Fishing
- Hiking
- Skiing
- Log cabins for day use
