= Anarchist Mountain =

Mountain in British Columbia, Canada

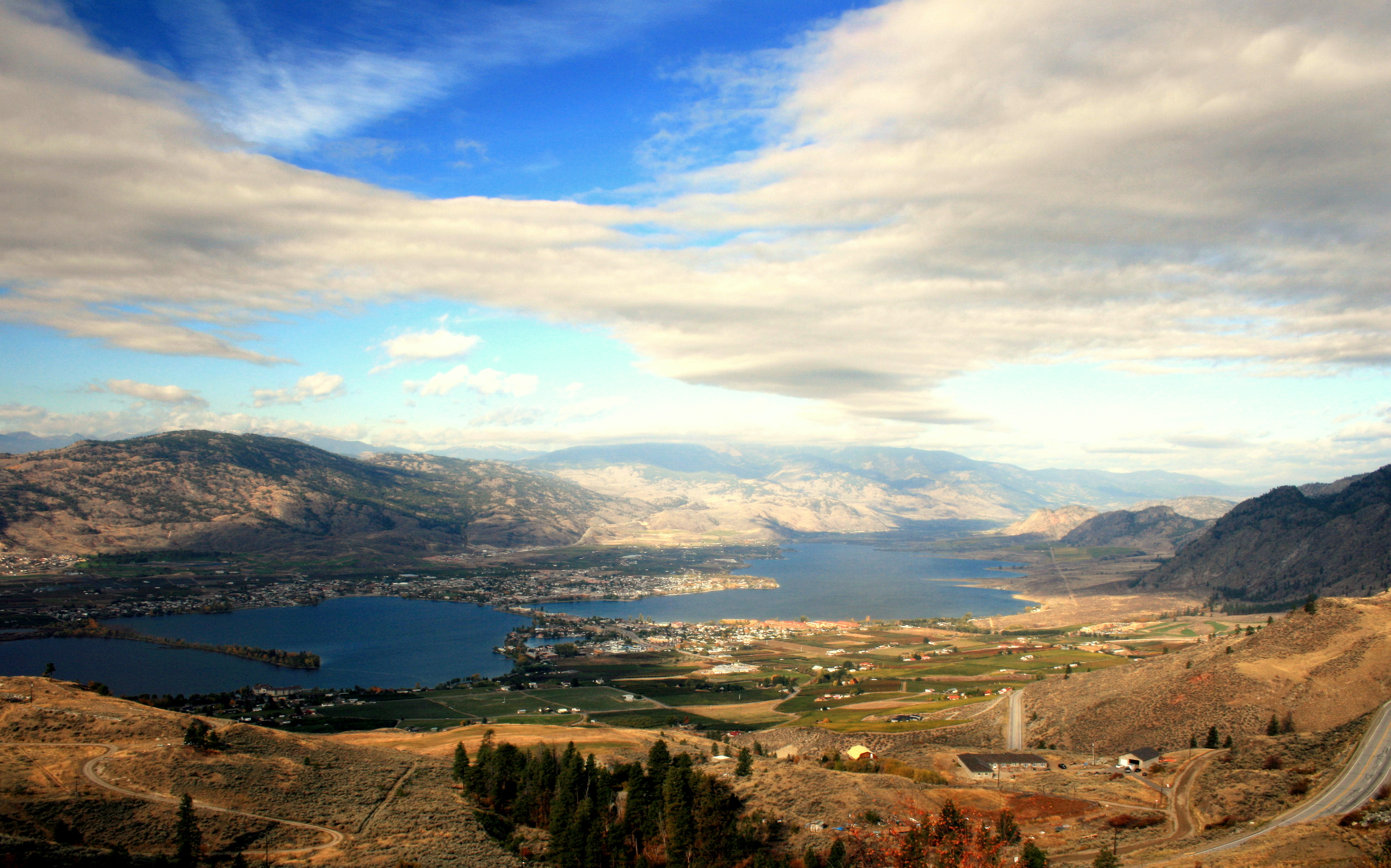
- View of Osoyoos Lake from near the summit of the hill-climb on Highway 3 to Anarchist Mountain

Highest point
- Elevation: 1,491 m (4,892 ft)
- Prominence: 186 m (610 ft)
- Listing: Mountains of British Columbia
- Coordinates: 49°02′18″N 119°20′10″W

Geography
- Location within British Columbia
- Interactive map of Anarchist Mountain
- Location: British Columbia, Canada
- District: Similkameen Division Yale Land District
- Parent range: Monashee Mountains
- Topo map: NTS 82E3 Osoyoos

Anarchist Mountain is a mountain in British Columbia, Canada, which rises 1,491 metres (4,892 ft) above sea level. Its summit is located 9.6 kilometres (6.0 mi) east of Osoyoos and 4.0 kilometres (2.5 mi) north of the United States border with Washington state. The term is used primarily to refer to the rural district around the summit and its communities, and also to the Crowsnest Highway with its long climb up the mountainside from the floor of the Okanagan Valley at Osoyoos, just below.

The name was officially adopted 6 June 1922 to refer to the plateau between Osoyoos, the town of Rock Creek, and the town of Sidley. Anarchist Mountain and Sidley were both named by Richard G. Sidley, a settler from Ontario who arrived in 1885, was appointed the first postmaster of Sidley in 1895, and was later made Justice of the Peace and Customs Officer. He named the mountain after prospector John Haywood, who called himself an Anarchist, and carried a stick of dynamite in his boot. Before Sidley, English speaking settlers called this summit Larch Tree Hill.

On July 16, 2003, a wildfire was sparked scorching 1,230 hectares along the mountain. Two structures were lost in the fire.

== Gallery ==
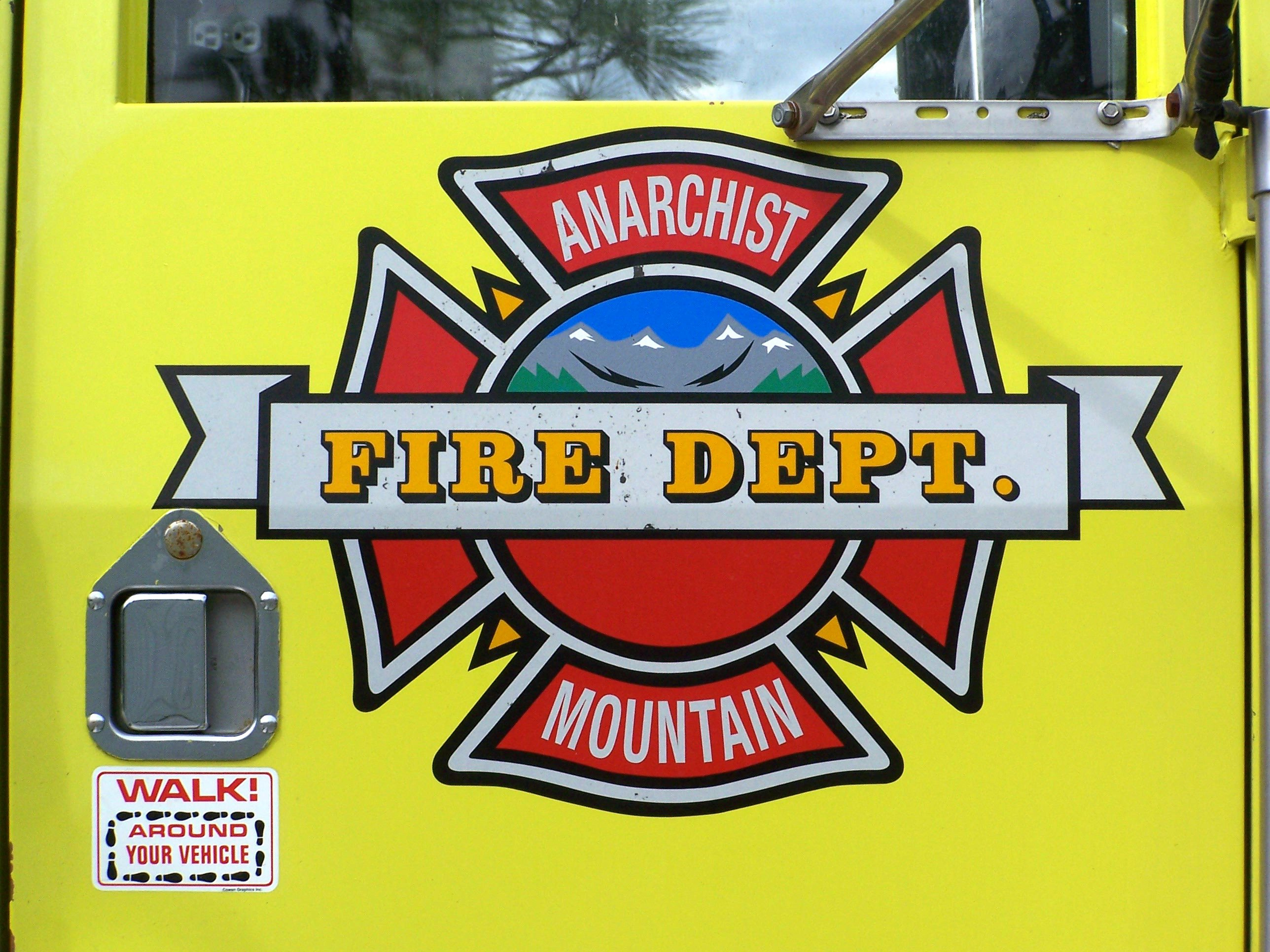
Anarchist Mountain Fire Department truck
