= Osoyoos =

- Town
- Town of Osoyoos
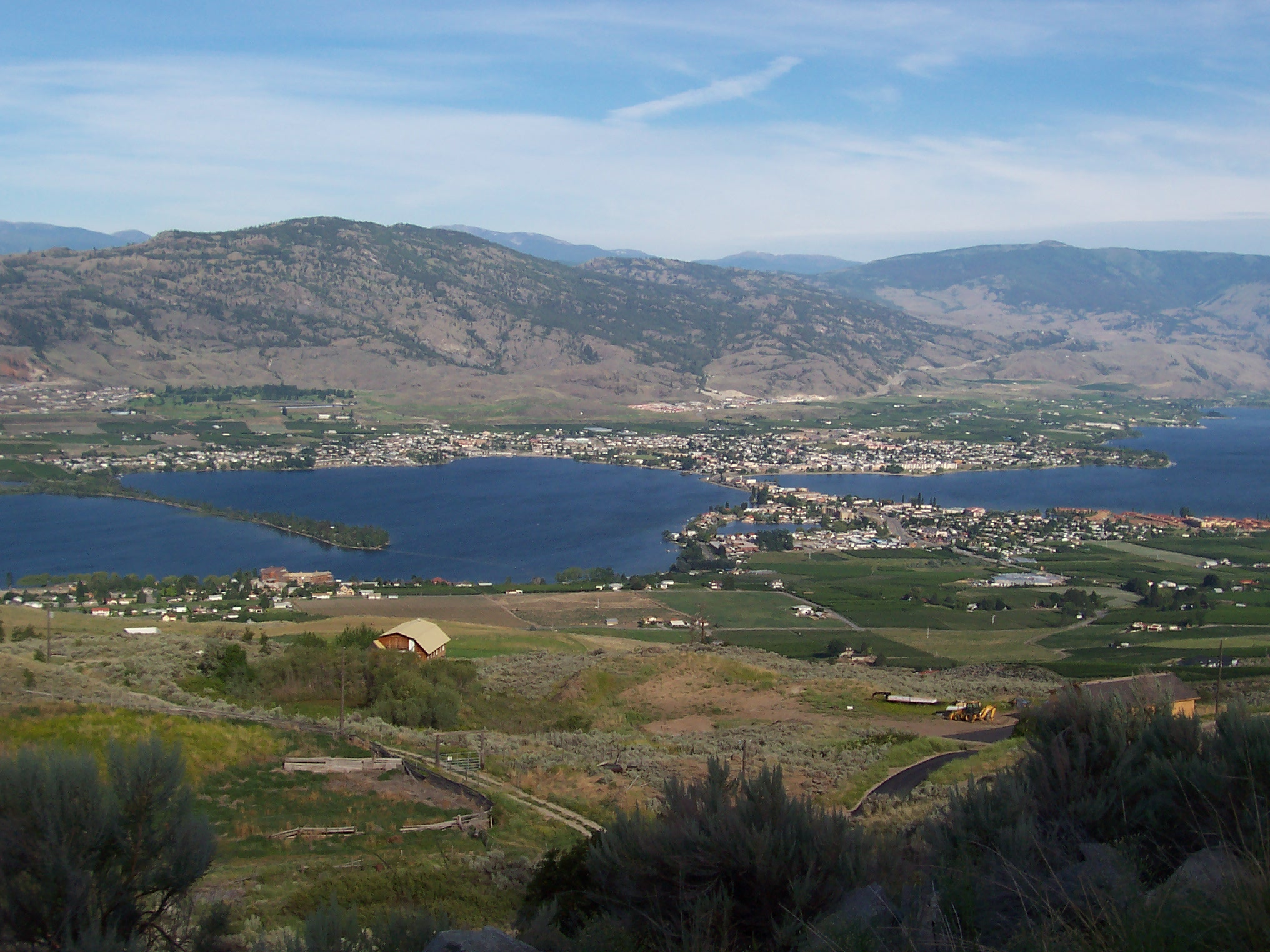
- Town of Osoyoos
- Motto: "Canada's warmest welcome"
- Location of Osoyoos Osoyoos (Canada)
- Coordinates: 49°01′57″N 119°28′06″W
- Country: Canada
- Province: British Columbia
- Region: South Okanagan / Boundary
- Regional District: Okanagan-Similkameen
- Incorporated: January 14, 1946

Government
  - Mayor: Dustin Sikora
  - Governing Body: Osoyoos Town Council
  - MP: Helena Konanz
  - MLA: Donegal Wilson

Area
  - Total: 8.76 km^{2} (3.38 sq mi)
- Elevation: 283 m (928 ft)

Population (2021)
  - Total: 5,556
  - Density: 660.7/km^{2} (1,711/sq mi)
- Time zone: UTC−07:00 (PT)
- Postal code span: V0H 1V0 & 2V0
- Area code: 250 / 778 / 236
- Highways: Highway 3 Highway 97
- NTS Map: 82E3 Osoyoos
- GNBC Code: JBHJG
- Website: www.osoyoos.ca

Osoyoos (/ɒˈsuːjuːs/, historically /ˈsuːjuːs/) is the southernmost town in the Okanagan Valley in British Columbia between Penticton and Omak. The town is 3.6 km (2.2 mi) north of the United States border in Washington and is adjacent to the Osoyoos Indian reserve. The origin of the name Osoyoos was the word sw̓iw̓s (pronounced "soo-yoos") meaning "narrowing of the waters" in the local Okanagan language (Syilx'tsn). The "O-" prefix is not indigenous in origin and was attached by settler-promoters wanting to harmonize the name with other place names beginning with O in the Okanagan region (Oliver, Omak, Oroville, Okanogan). There was a local newspaper, the Osoyoos Times, but merged with the Oliver Chronicle and became the Times Chronicle in May 2020.

The town's population of 5,556 (2021) swells in the summer months with seasonal visitors. Seniors (age 65 and over) comprise 43% of the town population. Another 2,139 people live around the town within Electoral Area A of the Regional District of Okanagan-Similkameen, and 1,426 more in the Osoyoos 1 Indian Reserve.

== History ==
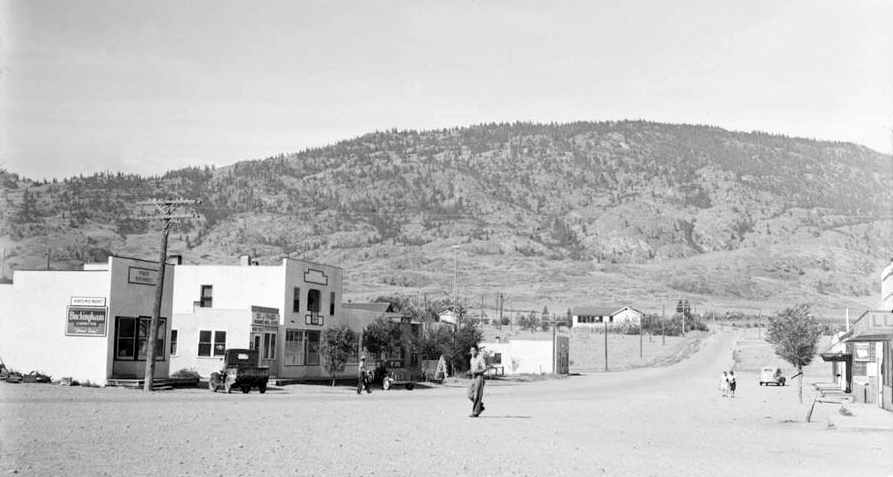
Osoyoos, 1943

The first Europeans to visit Osoyoos were fur traders working for the Pacific Fur Company, an American enterprise. They ventured up the Okanagan River to Osoyoos Lake and farther north. After the Hudson's Bay Company took over the fur trade in 1821, the Okanagan Valley became a major trade route for supplies to inland forts of British Columbia and furs that were shipped south to the Columbia River and the Pacific to European and Asian markets. The final Hudson's Bay Company brigade in 1860 was the end of an era, as gold rushes transformed the economy of the new Colony of British Columbia. As parties of miners headed for the Fraser goldfields via the Okanagan Trail, they commonly met conflict with the Okanagan people. The Dewdney Trail passed through Osoyoos on its way from Hope to the Kootenays. The trail now forms the backbone of the Crowsnest Highway.

Thousands of miners heading to the goldfields and drovers with large herds of livestock crossed the 49th parallel after 1858. A customs house was built in Osoyoos in 1861 with John Carmichael Haynes as the tax collector. Haynes was also the first pioneer settler who obtained land along the Okanagan River north of Osoyoos that had been part of the Osoyoos Indian Reserve established by the Joint Indian Reserve Commission in 1877. These lands, now known as the Haynes Lease lands, remain as an original house and barn.

Osoyoos was incorporated as a village in 1946 when the railway arrived and became a town in the 1980s. When the railway was discontinued, its station house was purchased from the Town of Osoyoos and moved 300 m north to its current location by the Osoyoos Sailing Club.

== Geography ==
Osoyoos is situated on the east-west Crowsnest Highway (Highway 3) with a significant ascent out of the Okanagan Valley in either direction. The Crowsnest headed east begins with an 18 km (11 mi) switchback up the flank of the Okanagan Highland with a 685 m (2,247 ft) rise to the mining and ranching region of Anarchist Mountain, which is part of the Boundary Country (the stretch of rising highway is also referred to as Anarchist Mountain). Highway 3 westbound leads to Keremeos and the Similkameen Valley via Richter Pass. On Highway 97 south is a 24-hour border crossing between Canada and the United States between Osoyoos and Oroville, Washington. The Canada–United States border is located 4 km (2.5 mi) south of the Highway 3 and 97 intersection on the northwest side of town.

The town is situated on Osoyoos Lake, which has a perimeter of 47.9 km (29.8 mi), an elevation of 276 m (906 ft), a maximum depth of 63 m (207 ft), and a mean depth of 14 m (46 ft). The lake's elevation marks the lowest point in Canada of the Okanagan Valley.

=== Ecology ===
The far southern reaches of the Okanagan and Similkameen Valleys are part of a threatened xeric shrubland ecosystem in Canada known as the Columbia Plateau ecoregion. Specifically, the ecosystem of the area is named after the antelope brush plant typical of the local climate. This ecosystem was once more prevalent in the South Okanagan but is now becoming fragmented and degraded due to the spread of agriculture, urban development, and other human activities.

Since 2003, a feasibility study by Parks Canada has been going on to determine the need for protection of a large area of grasslands west of the town known as the South Okanagan-Lower Similkameen National Park Reserve Feasibility Study.

=== Climate ===
Osoyoos

Climate chart (precipitation, max. and min. temperature)
J	F	M	A	M	J	J	A	S	O	N	D
29 2 −4	22 7 −3	24 13 0	24 18 4	37 23 8	42 27 12	25 32 14	17 31 14	15 26 9	19 16 4	34 7 −1	36 2 −4
- █ Average max. and min. temperatures in °C
- █ Precipitation totals in mm
Imperial conversion
J	F	M	A	M	J	J	A	S	O	N	D
1.1 36 25	0.9 44 27	0.9 55 31	0.9 65 38	1.5 74 46	1.6 80 53	1 89 58	0.7 88 56	0.6 78 48	0.7 62 38	1.3 45 31	1.4 36 26
- █ Average max. and min. temperatures in °F
- █ Precipitation totals in inches

The climate, according to the Köppen climate classification, is a cold semi-arid (BSk) with summers that are generally hot and dry. Although it claims to be a desert, Osoyoos is actually about 100 mm (3.9 in) too wet to be an actual desert. The average daytime temperature in Osoyoos is 17.0 °C (62.6 °F), which is the warmest in Canada. Osoyoos also has an average annual temperature of 10.7 °C (51.3 °F), which is one of the warmest in the country.

September and October are usually dry and sunny with cool mornings. Winters are short and mild by Canadian standards, and usually dry, but can be cold for brief periods during Arctic outflow conditions bringing sporadic snowfall. Spring arrives earlier than other parts of the Okanagan. Osoyoos averages seven months at or above a 10 °C (50 °F) mean temperature.

During the summer, the southern Okanagan Valley is on average one of the hottest areas in Canada during the day, one of the few places in Canada where the average high is above 30 °C (86 °F). Temperatures exceed 35 °C (95 °F) on average 17 days per summer, sometimes topping 38 °C (100 °F). Although days are hot, the humidity is low and nights cool adequately. The summer mean is higher in Windsor, Ontario, 21.6 °C (70.9 °F) in Osoyoos compared to 22.0 °C (71.6 °F) in Windsor, due to warmer nights where July averages 23.0 °C (73.4 °F). The USDA places Osoyoos in Plant Hardiness Zone 7a.

The highest temperature ever recorded in Osoyoos was 45.0 °C (113.0 °F) on 29 June 2021 during the 2021 Western North America heat wave. The coldest temperature ever recorded was −21.7 °C (−7.1 °F) on 4 December 2007 and −26.5 °C (−15.7 °F) at Osoyoos West on 29 December 1990.

Climate data for Osoyoos (Osoyoos CS) WMO ID: 71215; coordinates 49°01′42″N 119°26′28″W; elevation: 282.9 m (928 ft); 1991–2020 normals, extremes 1954–present (Note: Precipitation and precipitation days are for Osoyoos West: Climate ID: 1125865; coordinates 49°01′55″N 119°26′34″W; elevation: 297.2 m (975 ft); 1981–2010 normals.)
Month	Jan	Feb	Mar	Apr	May	Jun	Jul	Aug	Sep	Oct	Nov	Dec	Year
Record high humidex	15.5	16.0	25.0	29.6	36.2	45.8	46.5	45.3	39.0	30.2	19.4	14.5	46.5
Record high °C (°F)	16.1 (61.0)	16.2 (61.2)	25.4 (77.7)	29.8 (85.6)	36.1 (97.0)	45.0 (113.0)	42.8 (109.0)	41.7 (107.1)	37.5 (99.5)	28.2 (82.8)	18.6 (65.5)	14.9 (58.8)	45.0 (113.0)
Mean daily maximum °C (°F)	1.8 (35.2)	5.8 (42.4)	12.2 (54.0)	17.7 (63.9)	23.2 (73.8)	26.5 (79.7)	31.6 (88.9)	31.0 (87.8)	25.1 (77.2)	16.2 (61.2)	7.3 (45.1)	2.0 (35.6)	16.7 (62.1)
Daily mean °C (°F)	−1.0 (30.2)	1.4 (34.5)	6.1 (43.0)	10.7 (51.3)	15.8 (60.4)	19.2 (66.6)	23.2 (73.8)	22.5 (72.5)	17.2 (63.0)	10.2 (50.4)	3.6 (38.5)	−0.7 (30.7)	10.7 (51.3)
Mean daily minimum °C (°F)	−3.8 (25.2)	−3.1 (26.4)	0.0 (32.0)	3.6 (38.5)	8.4 (47.1)	11.9 (53.4)	14.8 (58.6)	14.0 (57.2)	9.3 (48.7)	4.1 (39.4)	−0.3 (31.5)	−3.4 (25.9)	4.6 (40.3)
Record low °C (°F)	−21.5 (−6.7)	−20.9 (−5.6)	−13.4 (7.9)	−7.3 (18.9)	−1.6 (29.1)	2.3 (36.1)	6.1 (43.0)	4.0 (39.2)	−1.3 (29.7)	−9.8 (14.4)	−17.5 (0.5)	−21.7 (−7.1)	−21.7 (−7.1)
Record low wind chill	−28.1	−24.5	−19.9	−8.1	−2.3	0.0	0.0	0.0	−2.3	−11.1	−24.5	−26.3	−28.1
Average precipitation mm (inches)	28.8 (1.13)	22.3 (0.88)	24.0 (0.94)	24.2 (0.95)	37.1 (1.46)	41.7 (1.64)	24.6 (0.97)	17.3 (0.68)	14.9 (0.59)	18.6 (0.73)	33.8 (1.33)	35.8 (1.41)	323.2 (12.72)
Average rainfall mm (inches)	14.3 (0.56)	17.7 (0.70)	22.3 (0.88)	24.1 (0.95)	37.1 (1.46)	41.7 (1.64)	24.6 (0.97)	17.3 (0.68)	14.9 (0.59)	18.5 (0.73)	28.2 (1.11)	18.8 (0.74)	279.4 (11.00)
Average snowfall cm (inches)	14.6 (5.7)	4.6 (1.8)	1.7 (0.7)	0.1 (0.0)	0.0 (0.0)	0.0 (0.0)	0.0 (0.0)	0.0 (0.0)	0.0 (0.0)	0.1 (0.0)	5.7 (2.2)	17.0 (6.7)	43.8 (17.2)
Average precipitation days (≥ 0.2 mm)	12.0	9.2	9.9	9.7	10.4	10.2	6.7	5.5	5.2	7.8	12.2	12.3	111.1
Average rainy days (≥ 0.2 mm)	6.0	6.9	9.2	9.6	10.4	10.2	6.7	5.5	5.2	7.7	10.2	5.6	93.4
Average snowy days (≥ 0.2 cm)	6.7	2.7	1.1	0.1	0.0	0.0	0.0	0.0	0.0	0.1	2.7	7.6	20.9
Average relative humidity (%) (at 1500 LST)	73.9	58.7	43.5	33.9	34.1	35.0	27.9	29.1	35.9	48.3	65.1	73.0	46.5
Source: Environment and Climate Change Canada (June maximum) (precipitation / precipitation days)

Average number of days:

- above 20 °C (68 °F): 152.2
- above 30 °C (86 °F): 53.0
- above 35 °C (95 °F): 15.5

== Agriculture ==
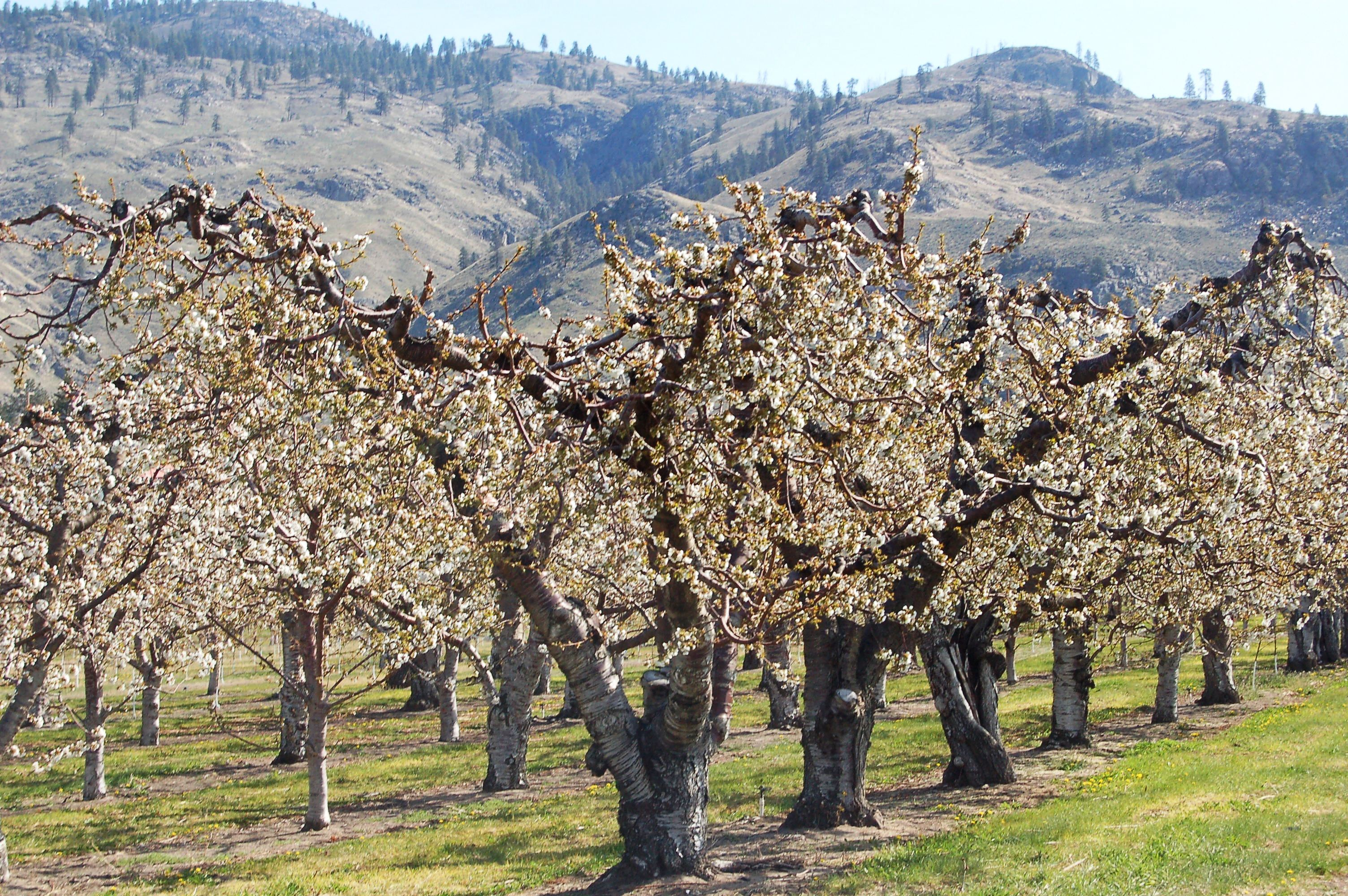
Osoyoos fruit trees in April

Although the fruit-growing possibilities were noticed by early settlers, the first commercial orchard in the area was not established until 1907, growing cherries, apricots, nectarines, peaches, plums, pears and apples. Osoyoos Orchard Limited was formed in 1920 and an irrigation project was planned which finally brought water to the west bench via "The Ditch" in 1927. The former shrub-steppe environment was transformed into a lush agricultural belt and Osoyoos promoted "the earliest fruit in Canada".

Today, the area continues to produce tree fruits. Aside from tourism, agriculture is a major component of the local economy, as is evident by the abundant produce stands along Highways 3 and 97, and the numerous commercial orchards surrounding the town. With the growing popularity of viticulture, some of these orchards are being converted to vineyards, as the area is a major wine-producing region of Canada. After clearing of mainly sagebrush, parcels of bench land have been replanted for viticulture.

The vast majority of the land in the valley bottom surrounding the town is protected by the Agricultural Land Reserve which prevents valuable agricultural lands from being converted into other uses.

== Tourism ==
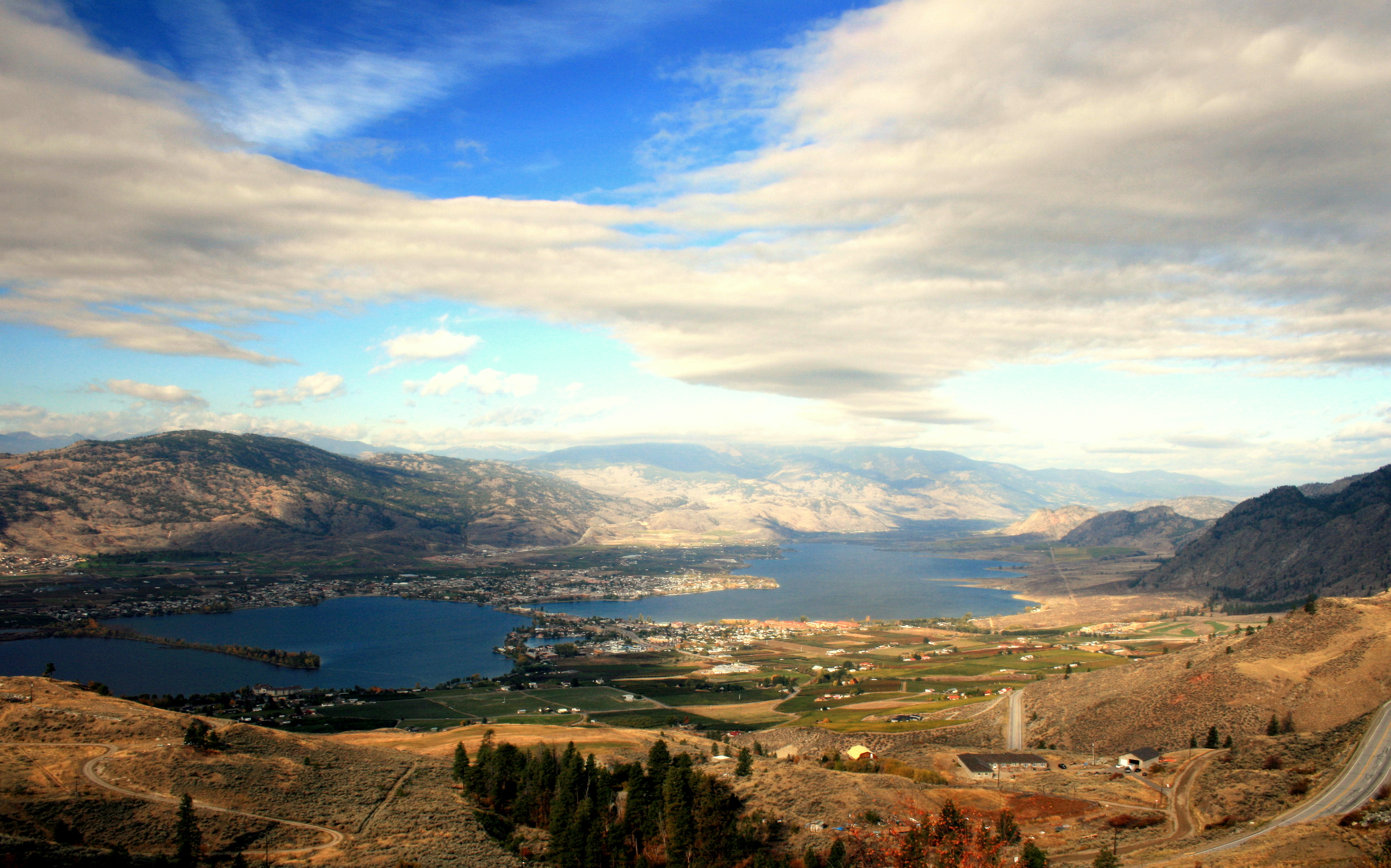
Looking over Osoyoos Lake

Tourism in the Osoyoos area is a large contributor to the local economy. This tourism is stimulated by many amenities in the Osoyoos area.

Osoyoos Lake is "the warmest freshwater lake in Canada" according to the town of Osoyoos and the BC Parks System, with reported average summer water temperatures of 24 °C (75 °F). The lake is surrounded by kilometres of beaches (public and private), parks and picnic grounds, such as Gyro Beach, Lions Centennial Park, Kinsmen Park, Legion Beach and Sẁiẁs Provincial Park. There are also major plans to revitalize the waterfront along the town core, spurred on by recent major developments, such as the Watermark Beach Resort, increased public space, and an expanded marina.

Spotted Lake is a saline endorheic alkali lake located northwest of Osoyoos.

There are two centres dedicated to preserving the ecosystem of the Okanagan Desert. The Osoyoos Desert Centre is located 3 km (2 mi) north of Osoyoos off Highway 97, while the Nk'Mip Desert Cultural Centre is located adjacent to the Nk'mip Winery on the Osoyoos Indian Reserve.

The area is served by four championship golf courses: Osoyoos Golf Club, having two distinct eighteen-hole courses – the Park Meadows Golf Course and the Desert Gold Golf Course – Fairview Mountain Golf Club (ranked among Canada's top 100 golf courses in 2025, Oliver), and the Nk'Mip Canyon Desert Golf Course (Oliver) – and one nine-hole course, Sonora Dunes (at Spirit Ridge in Osoyoos).

== Demographics ==
Historical populations, 1951 to 2016

Historical population
Year	Pop.	±%
1951	899	—
1956	860	−4.3%
1961	1,022	+18.8%
1966	1,166	+14.1%
1971	1,285	+10.2%
1976	2,100	+63.4%
1981	2,738	+30.4%
1986	2,956	+8.0%
1991	3,403	+15.1%
1996	4,127	+21.3%
2001	4,295	+4.1%
2006	4,752	+10.6%
2011	4,845	+2.0%
2016	5,085	+5.0%
Sources: Statistics Canada

In the 2021 Census of Population conducted by Statistics Canada, Osoyoos had a population of 5,556 living in 2,647 of its 3,279 total private dwellings, a change of 10% from its 2016 population of 5,050. With a land area of 8.41 km^{2} (3.25 sq mi), it had a population density of 660.6/km^{2} (1,711.1/sq mi) in 2021.

The town's popularity among retirees is reflected in the age of the average resident at 55.4 years (2016) compared to 40.8 years for the rest of the population of British Columbia. The average age of the Osoyoos senior population is second in Canada only to Qualicum Beach, BC (60.1 years).

The town is served by a high school, Osoyoos Secondary School.

=== Ethnicity ===
Panethnic groups in the Town of Osoyoos (1996−2021)
Panethnic group	2021		2016		2011		2006		2001		1996	
Panethnic group	Pop.	%	Pop.	%	Pop.	%	Pop.	%	Pop.	%	Pop.	%
European (Note: Statistic includes all persons that did not make up part of a visible minority or an indigenous identity.)	4,530	85.8%	4,235	87.14%	4,115	89.95%	4,470	96.34%	4,175	98.35%	3,680	92.58%
South Asian	305	5.78%	225	4.63%	270	5.9%	45	0.97%	25	0.59%	60	1.51%
Indigenous	215	4.07%	245	5.04%	100	2.19%	70	1.51%	25	0.59%	85	2.14%
Southeast Asian (Note: Statistic includes total responses of "Filipino" and "Southeast Asian" under visible minority section on census.)	85	1.61%	10	0.21%	0	0%	0	0%	0	0%	40	1.01%
Latin American	75	1.42%	30	0.62%	0	0%	10	0.22%	0	0%	25	0.63%
East Asian (Note: Statistic includes total responses of "Chinese", "Korean", and "Japanese" under visible minority section on census.)	10	0.19%	55	1.13%	55	1.2%	50	1.08%	15	0.35%	55	1.38%
African	10	0.19%	45	0.93%	20	0.44%	0	0%	10	0.24%	0	0%
Middle Eastern (Note: Statistic includes total responses of "West Asian" and "Arab" under visible minority section on census.)	0	0%	10	0.21%	0	0%	0	0%	0	0%	15	0.38%
Other/multiracial (Note: Statistic includes total responses of "Visible minority, n.i.e." and "Multiple visible minorities" under visible minority section on census.)	40	0.76%	15	0.31%	0	0%	0	0%	0	0%	0	0%
Total responses	5,280	95.03%	4,860	96.24%	4,575	94.43%	4,640	97.64%	4,245	98.84%	3,975	96.32%
Total population	5,556	100%	5,050	100%	4,845	100%	4,752	100%	4,295	100%	4,127	100%
Note: Totals greater than 100% due to multiple origin responses.

=== Religion ===
According to the 2021 census, religious groups in Osoyoos included:

- Christianity (2,600 persons or 49.3%)
- Irreligion (2,345 persons or 44.5%)
- Sikhism (225 persons or 4.3%)
- Hinduism (45 persons or 0.9%)
- Buddhism (10 persons or 0.2%)
- Islam (10 persons or 0.2%)
- Other (15 persons or 0.3%)

== Sports ==
Club	League	Sport	Venue	Established	Championships
Osoyoos Coyotes	KIJHL	Ice hockey	Osoyoos Sunbowl Arena	2010	1 (2011)

== Notable people ==
- George Victor Jmaeff - U.S. Marine and Navy Cross recipient
- Chuck Kobasew – retired professional hockey player
- Jack B. Newton – amateur astronomer
- Liam Ruck and Markus Ruck – twin professional hockey players
- Alison Smith – television journalist and anchor

== See also ==
- List of francophone communities in British Columbia
