= Crowsnest Highway =

Canadian cross-provincial highway (est. 1932)

Crowsnest Highway
- Highway 3
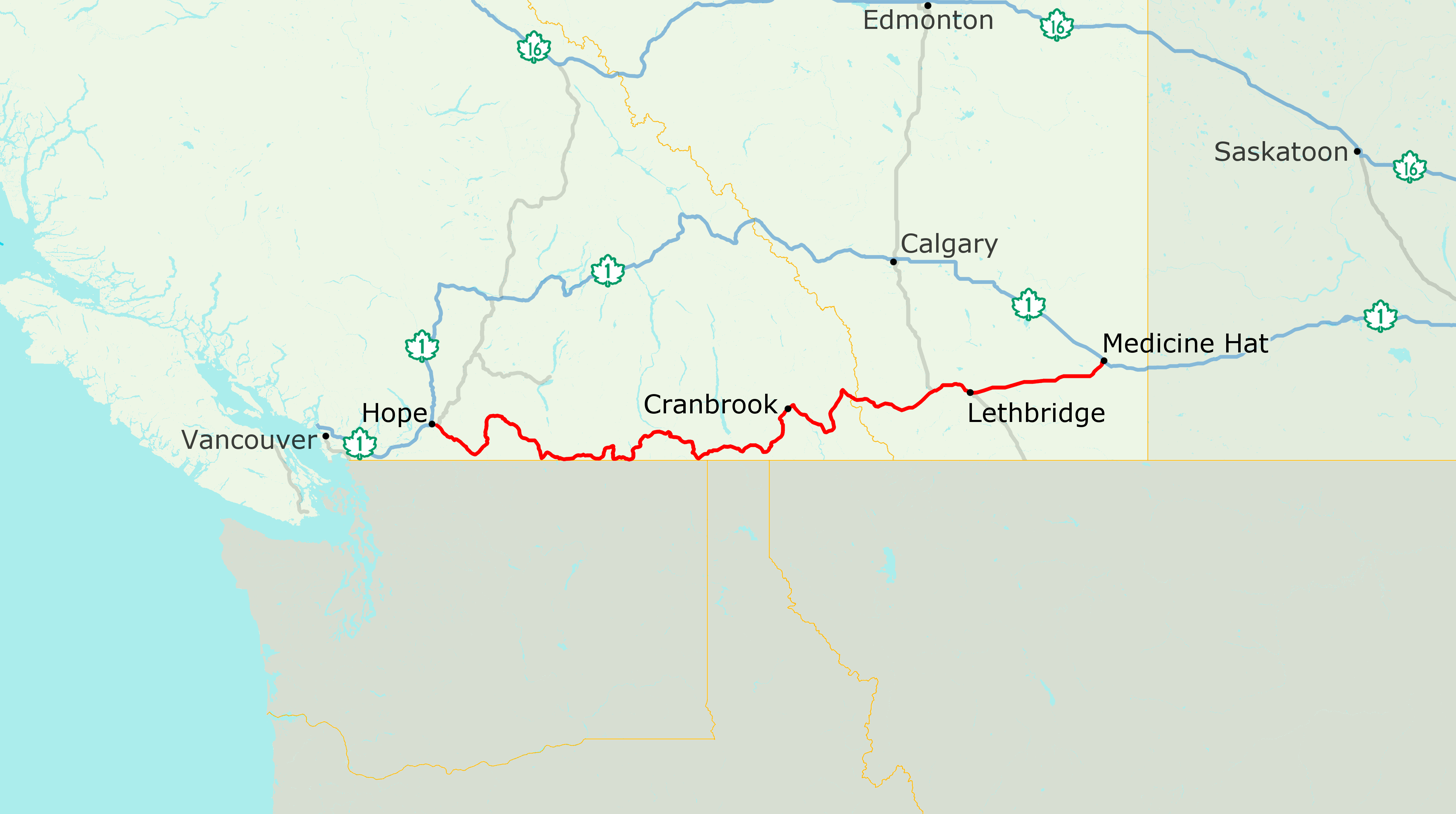
- The Crowsnest Highway highlighted in red

Route information
- Length: 1,161 km (721 mi)
- Existed: 1932–present
- Component highways: BC 3, AB 3

Major junctions
- West end: Highway 1 (TCH) in Hope
- Highway 5 near Hope; Highway 97 in Osoyoos; Highway 95 from Yahk and Cranbrook; Highway 93 from Cranbrook and Elko; Highway 22 near Lundbreck; Highway 2 in Fort Macleod; Highway 4 in Lethbridge; Highway 36 in Taber
- East end: Highway 1 (TCH) in Medicine Hat

Location
- Country: Canada
- Provinces: British Columbia, Alberta

Highway system
National Highway System

The Crowsnest Highway is an east-west highway in British Columbia and Alberta, Canada. It stretches 1,161 kilometres (721 miles) across the southern portions of both provinces, from Hope, British Columbia to Medicine Hat, Alberta, providing the shortest highway connection between the Lower Mainland and southeast Alberta through the Canadian Rockies. Mostly two-lane, the highway was officially designated in 1932, mainly following a mid-19th-century gold rush trail originally traced out by an engineer named Edgar Dewdney. It takes its name "Crowsnest" from the Crowsnest Pass, the location at which the highway crosses the Continental Divide between British Columbia and Alberta.

In British Columbia, the highway is entirely in mountainous regions and is also known as the Southern Trans-Provincial Highway. The western-most segment between the Trans-Canada Highway and Highway 5A is locally known as the Hope–Princeton Highway, and passes by the site of the Hope Slide. In Alberta, the terrain is initially mountainous, before smoothing to foothills and eventually generally flat prairie in the vicinity of Pincher Creek. The highway forms part of the Red Coat Trail and the CANAMEX Corridor from Highway 2 near Fort Macleod to Highway 4 in Lethbridge. Many sections of the highway were built by Japanese labour while they were interned during the Second World War, including sections like the Hope-Princeton. This history has been preserved at a heritage marker at Sunshine Valley, which was the largest internment camp in Canada.

== Route description ==
Crowsnest Highway is designated a core route in Canada's National Highway System, and is designated as Highway 3 for its entire length.

=== British Columbia ===
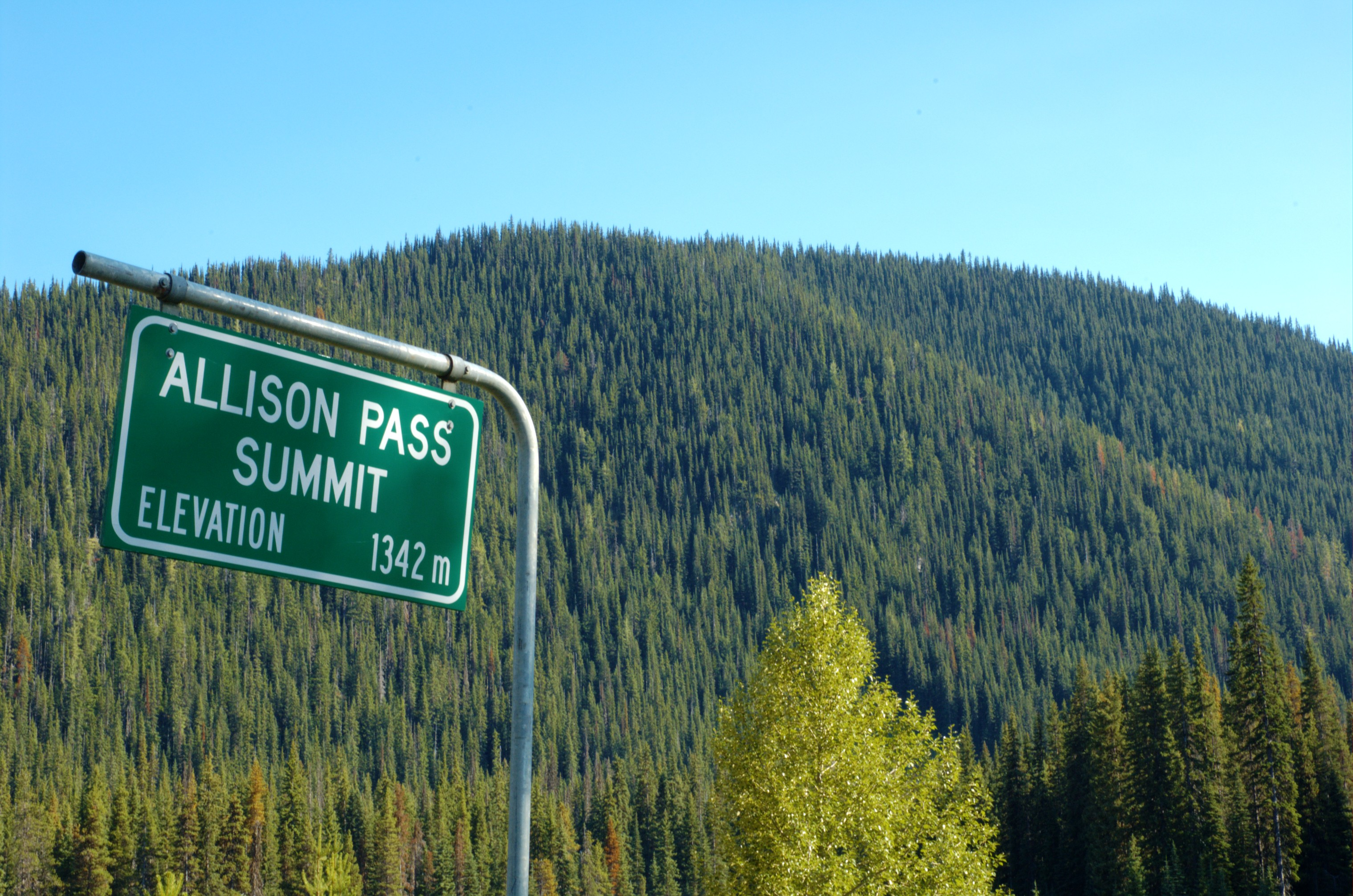
The peak of Allison Pass.

The Crowsnest Highway's western terminus is at Hope, where it branches off from the Trans-Canada Highway (British Columbia Highway 1). The highway goes east for 7 km (4 mi) to its junction with the Coquihalla Highway (Highway 5), where it exits the freeway and continues for 127 km (79 mi) on a segment known as the Hope–Princeton Highway, passing the Hope Slide en route to Allison Pass, Manning Provincial Park, and Sunday Summit; at Princeton, the Crowsnest Highway meets Highway 5A. East of Princeton, the Crowsnest Highway goes southeast for 67 km (42 mi) to Keremeos, where it meets Highway 3A, leading towards Penticton and Highway 97. Another 46 km (29 mi) southeast, the Crowsnest Highway reaches Osoyoos and a junction with Highway 97.

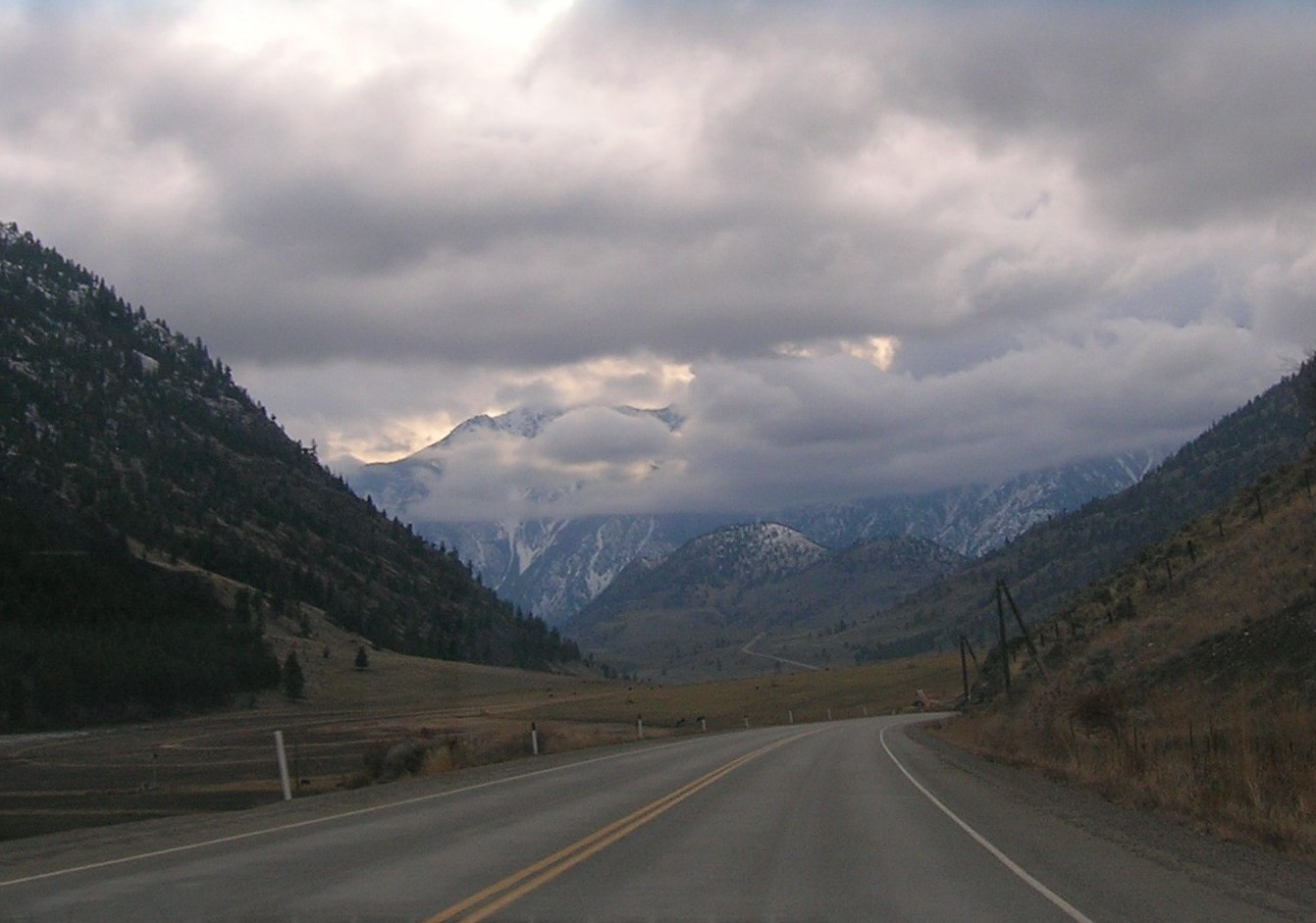
Through the Similkameen Valley westwards into the mountains

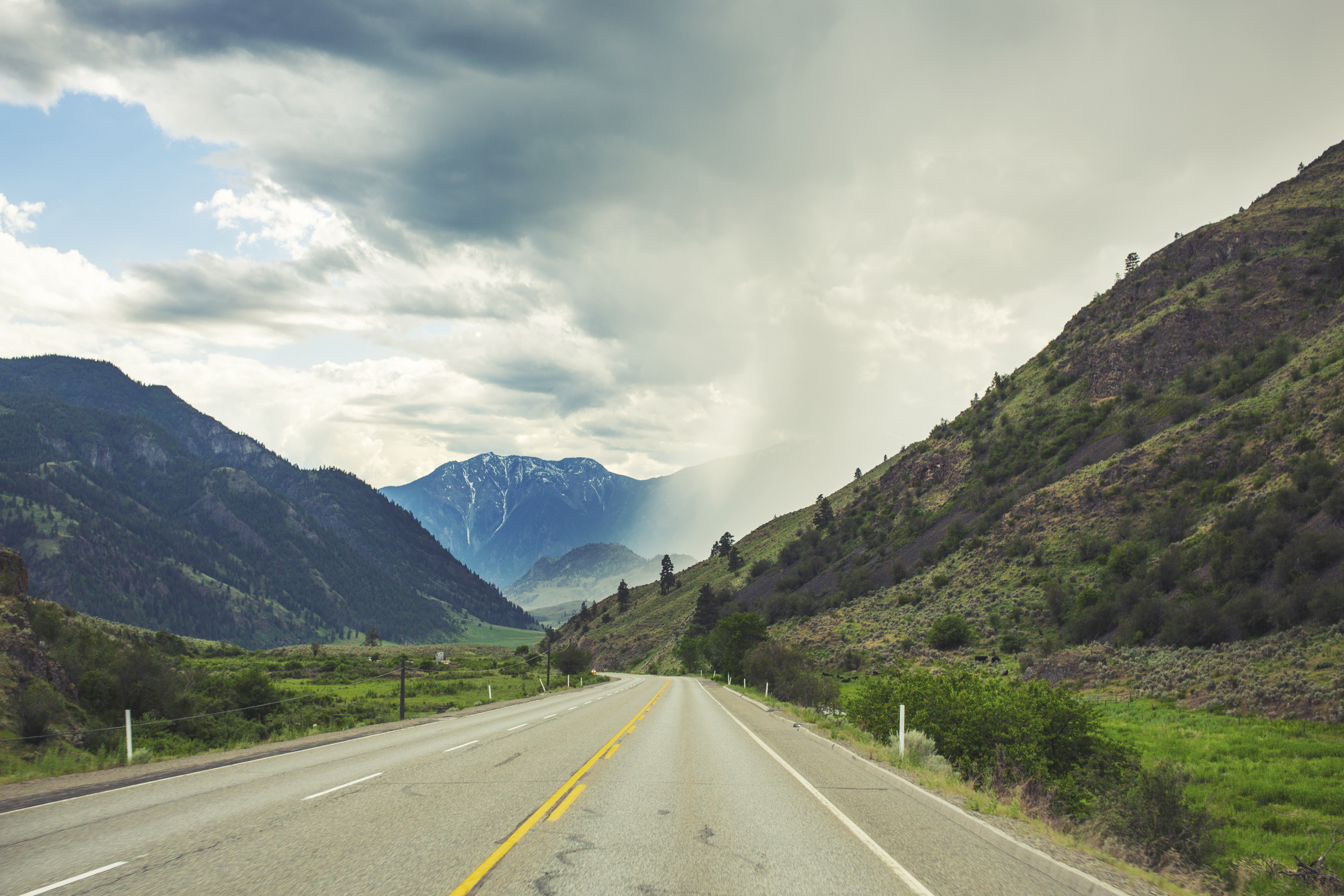
Westward into Similkameen Valley

Approximately 52 km (32 mi) east of Osoyoos, the Crowsnest Highway reaches its junction with Highway 33 at Rock Creek, then the highway heads east for 70 km (43 mi) to its junction with Highway 41, just before passing through Grand Forks. Another 26 km (16 mi) east, the Crowsnest Highway meets Highway 395 at the southern end of Christina Lake. The Crowsnest Highway travels for 47 km (29 mi) through Bonanza Pass to its junction with Highway 3B at Nancy Greene Lake, which is the cutoff to Rossland and Trail. It is another 26 km (16 mi) east to Castlegar, where the Crowsnest Highway intersects Highway 22 and Highway 3A, leading towards Nelson. Approximately 26 km (16 mi) east of Castlegar, the Crowsnest Highway reaches its eastern junction with Highway 3B; another 11 km (6.8 mi) to the east it converges with Highway 6 at Salmo and the two highways share a concurrency for 14 km (9 mi) to Burnt Flat.

The Crowsnest Highway continues through the Kootenay Pass on the Salmo-Creston Highway, a stretch known colloquially as the Kootenay Skyway, or Salmo-Creston Skyway. 67 km (42 mi) east of Burnt Flat, the Crowsnest Highway reaches Creston, just past junctions with Highway 21 and Highway 3A. 40 km (25 mi) later, south of Yahk, Highway 95 merges onto the Crowsnest Highway. The two highways share a common alignment for 72 km (45 mi) northeast to Cranbrook and the junction with Highway 95A. Another 6 km (4 mi) east, Highway 95 diverges north while Highway 93 merges onto the Crowsnest Highway from a shared alignment. Highway 93 and the Crowsnest share a common alignment for the next 53 km (33 mi) southeast to Elko, where Highway 93 diverges south. 31 km (19 mi) northeast of Elko, the Crowsnest Highway reaches Fernie, then it goes north another 30 km (19 mi) to its junction with Highway 43 at Sparwood, and another 19 km (12 mi) east, the highway reaches the boundary with Alberta at Crowsnest Pass.

=== Alberta ===
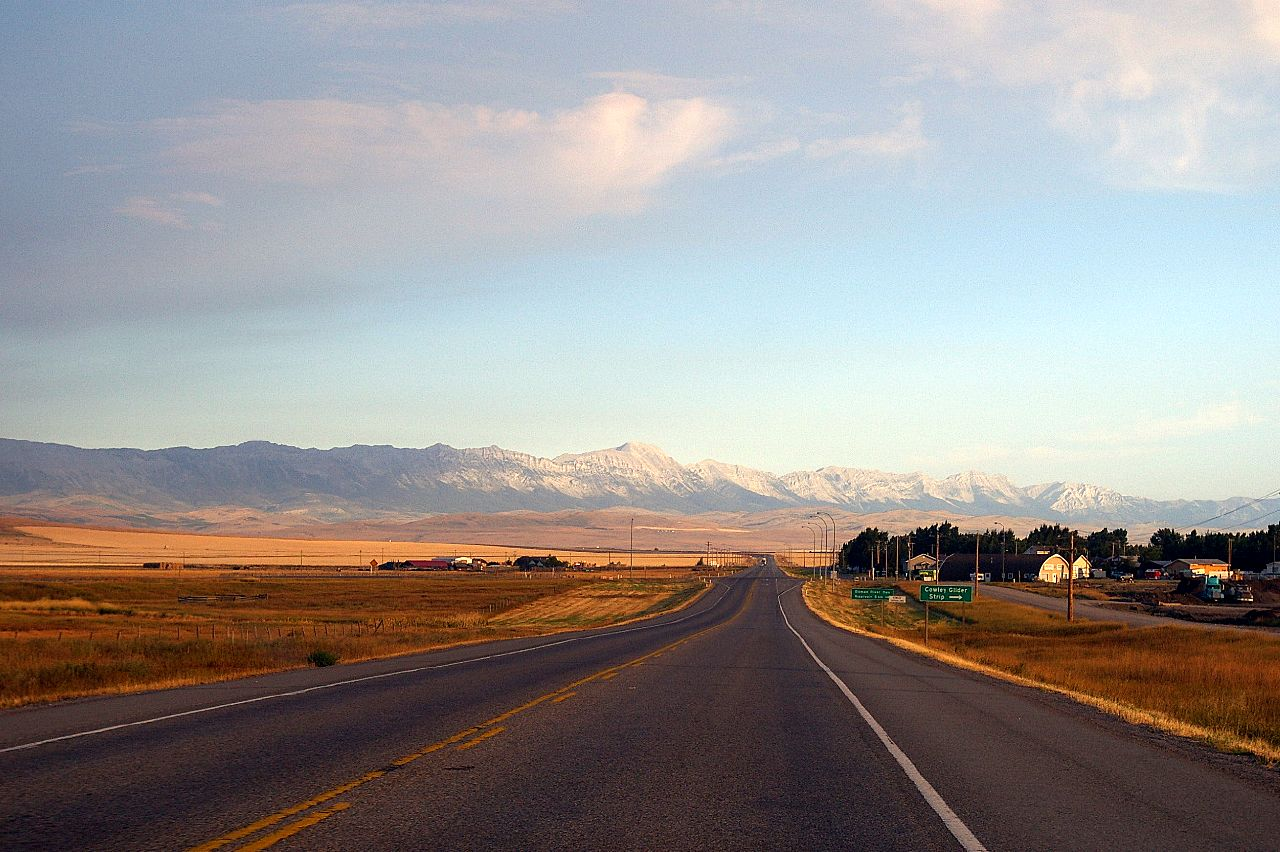
Highway 3 near Cowley, Alberta

The Alberta portion of the Crowsnest Highway is also designated as Highway 3, running for approximately 323 km (201 mi) from the British Columbia border to Medicine Hat. It begins in Crowsnest Pass paralleling the Canadian Pacific Railway, first meeting Highway 40 at Coleman, then running 26 km (16 mi) east to the southern terminus of Highway 22. Highway 6 splits south near Pincher Creek. Approximately 50 km (31 mi) east of Pincher Creek, the highway becomes divided and interchanges with Highway 2 with which it is briefly concurrent, assuming the designation of the Red Coat Trail and CANAMEX Corridor. It proceeds for 5 km (3 mi) into the town of Fort Macleod, after which Highway 2 splits south to Cardston and the United States border. Highway 3 then crosses the Oldman River east of Fort Macleod near Monarch, prior to a partial interchange with Highway 23.

After Coalhurst, the highway reaches Westview Drive W, which provides access to West Lethbridge. It then becomes a freeway named Crowsnest Trail as it reaches Highway 25 which branches north to Picture Butte while University Drive runs south to the University of Lethbridge as the main thoroughfare through West Lethbridge. Highway 3 again crosses the Oldman River in central Lethbridge and the freeway segment ends at Mayor Magrath Drive, marking the northern terminus of Highway 5. The highway meets the northern end of Highway 4 at the eastern limit of Lethbridge before continuing east to Coaldale and Taber. Within Taber, Highway 36 runs concurrently with Highway 3 for 3 km (2 mi). The highway reduces to a two-lane undivided road and the Crowsnest Highway ends 113 km (70 mi) later at the Trans-Canada Highway (Alberta Highway 1) in Medicine Hat.

== Future ==
Alberta Transportation has long-term plans to upgrade the entire Highway 3 corridor to a freeway from the British Columbia border to Medicine Hat. The plans include the construction of a Lethbridge bypass to render the CANAMEX Corridor free-flowing through southern Alberta, in combination with proposed bypasses of Fort Macleod, Claresholm and Nanton. The route would split from Highway 3 west of Coalhurst and run east, bypassing Lethbridge and Coaldale to the north before rejoining the existing highway.

During the 2021 British Columbia floods, the Crowsnest Highway was closed by landslides, as were the other routes connecting the Lower Mainland with the rest of Canada. It was the first of these routes to reopen. During the period when it was the only road route between Metro Vancouver and the rest of Canada, it experienced a high rate of crashes among heavy trucks driving faster than the route's windy curves would allow for.

== Major intersections ==
The following is a list of major intersections along the Crowsnest Highway:

Province	Location	km	mi	Destinations	Notes
British Columbia	Hope	0.0	0.0	Highway 1 (TCH) – Vancouver, Cache Creek, Kamloops, Prince George	Western terminus; exit 170
British Columbia		6.7	4.2	Highway 5 north (Coquihalla Highway) – Merritt, Kelowna, Kamloops	Exit 177
British Columbia	Princeton	133.9	83.2	Highway 5A north – Merritt, Kamloops	
British Columbia	Keremeos	201.1	125.0	Highway 3A north – Penticton	
British Columbia	Osoyoos	247.1	153.5	Highway 97 – Penticton, Kelowna, U.S. Border, Wenatchee	
British Columbia	Rock Creek	299.1	185.9	Highway 33 north – Kelowna	
British Columbia	near Grand Forks	368.5	229.0	Highway 41 south – U.S. Border	
British Columbia	near Christina Lake	392.1	243.6	Highway 395 south – U.S. Border, Spokane	
British Columbia		441.5	274.3	Highway 3B east – Rossland, Trail	
British Columbia	Castlegar	467.9	290.7	Highway 22 south – Rossland, Trail	
British Columbia	Castlegar	469.2	291.5	Highway 3A east – Nelson	
British Columbia		495.7	308.0	Highway 3B west – Trail, Rossland	
British Columbia	Salmo	506.1	314.5	Highway 6 north – Nelson	West end of Highway 6 concurrency
British Columbia		520.2	323.2	Highway 6 south – U.S. Border, Spokane	East end of Highway 6 concurrency
British Columbia	Creston	585.1	363.6	Highway 21 south – U.S. Border, Coeur d'Alene	
British Columbia	Creston	586.5	364.4	Highway 3A north – Kootenay Lake Ferry, Nelson	
British Columbia	Yahk	626.6	389.4	Highway 95 south – U.S. Border, Coeur d'Alene	West end of Highway 95 concurrency
British Columbia	Cranbrook	698.9	434.3	Highway 95A north – Kimberley	
British Columbia		704.3	437.6	Highway 93 north / Highway 95 north – Invermere, Radium Hot Springs	East end of Highway 95 concurrency; west end of Highway 93 concurrency
British Columbia	Elko	760.1	472.3	Highway 93 south – U.S. Border, Kalispell	West end of Highway 93 concurrency
British Columbia	Sparwood	821.9	510.7	Highway 43 north – Elkford	
Alberta – British Columbia border		841.3	522.8	Crowsnest Pass (Continental Divide)	
Alberta	Crowsnest Pass	856.9	532.5	Highway 40 north (Forestry Trunk Road)	
Alberta	near Lundbreck	883.1	548.7	Highway 22 north – Longview, Black Diamond, Turner Valley	
Alberta		903.2	561.2	Highway 6 south – Pincher Creek, Waterton Park	
Alberta	Fort Macleod	946.7	588.3	Highway 2 north – Calgary	West end of Highway 2 concurrency
Alberta	Fort Macleod	951.9	591.5	Highway 2 south – Cardston, Waterton Park	East end of Highway 2 concurrency; Red Coat Trail western terminus
Alberta		973.1	604.7	Highway 3A east to Highway 23 north – Monarch, Vulcan	Eastbound access to Highway 23
Alberta	Monarch	978.4	607.9	Highway 3A west / Highway 23 north – Vulcan, Calgary	Westbound exit, eastbound entrance
Alberta	Lethbridge	994.4	617.9	Highway 25 north – West Lethbridge, Picture Butte	
Alberta	Lethbridge	997.6	619.9	To Highway 4 / Highway 5 (1 Avenue S / Scenic Drive) / Red Coat Trail	East end of Red Coat Trail concurrency
Alberta	Lethbridge	1,000.7	621.8	Highway 5 south (Mayor Magrath Drive) – Cardston	
Alberta	Lethbridge	1,003.1	623.3	Highway 4 south (43 Street) – Coutts, U.S. Border, Great Falls	
Alberta	Taber	1,049.9	652.4	Highway 36 south – Warner	West end of Highway 36 concurrency
Alberta	Taber	1,052.5	654.0	Highway 36 north – Vauxhall, Brooks	East end of Highway 36 concurrency
Alberta	Medicine Hat	1,165.3	724.1	Highway 1 (TCH) – Calgary, Swift Current Highway 41A east (Gershaw Drive SW)	Eastern terminus
1.000 mi = 1.609 km; 1.000 km = 0.621 mi: Concurrency terminus; Incomplete access

== See also ==
- CANAMEX Corridor
- Dewdney Trail
- Kettle Valley Railway (southern mainline of the CPR)
- Pan-American Highway
- Red Coat Trail
- Yellowhead Highway
