= List of lakes of Washington =

This is a list of natural lakes and reservoirs located fully or partially in the U.S. state of Washington. Natural lakes that have been altered with a dam, such as Lake Chelan, are included as lakes, not reservoirs. Swimming, fishing, and/or boating are permitted in some of these lakes, but not all.

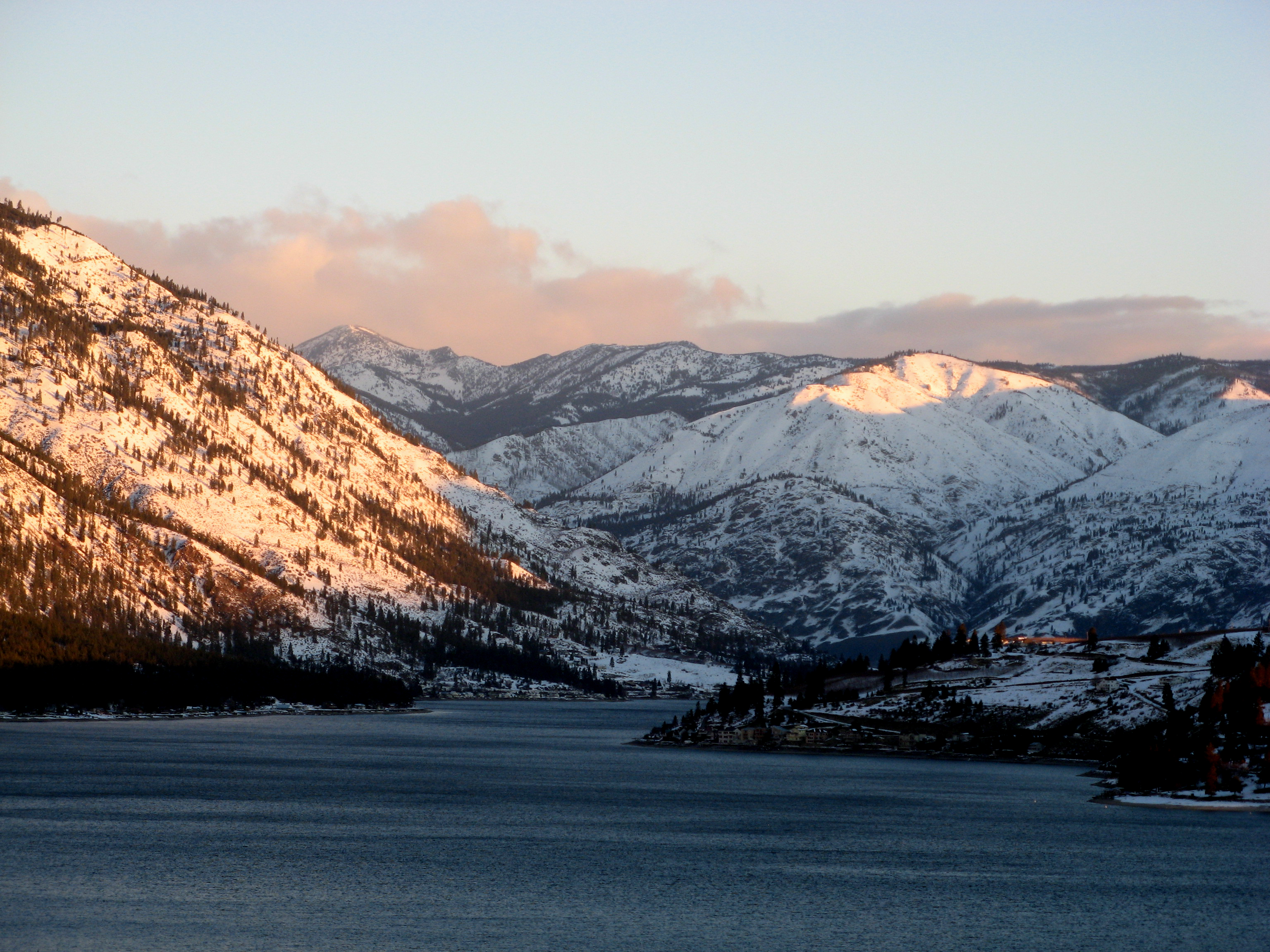
Lake Chelan

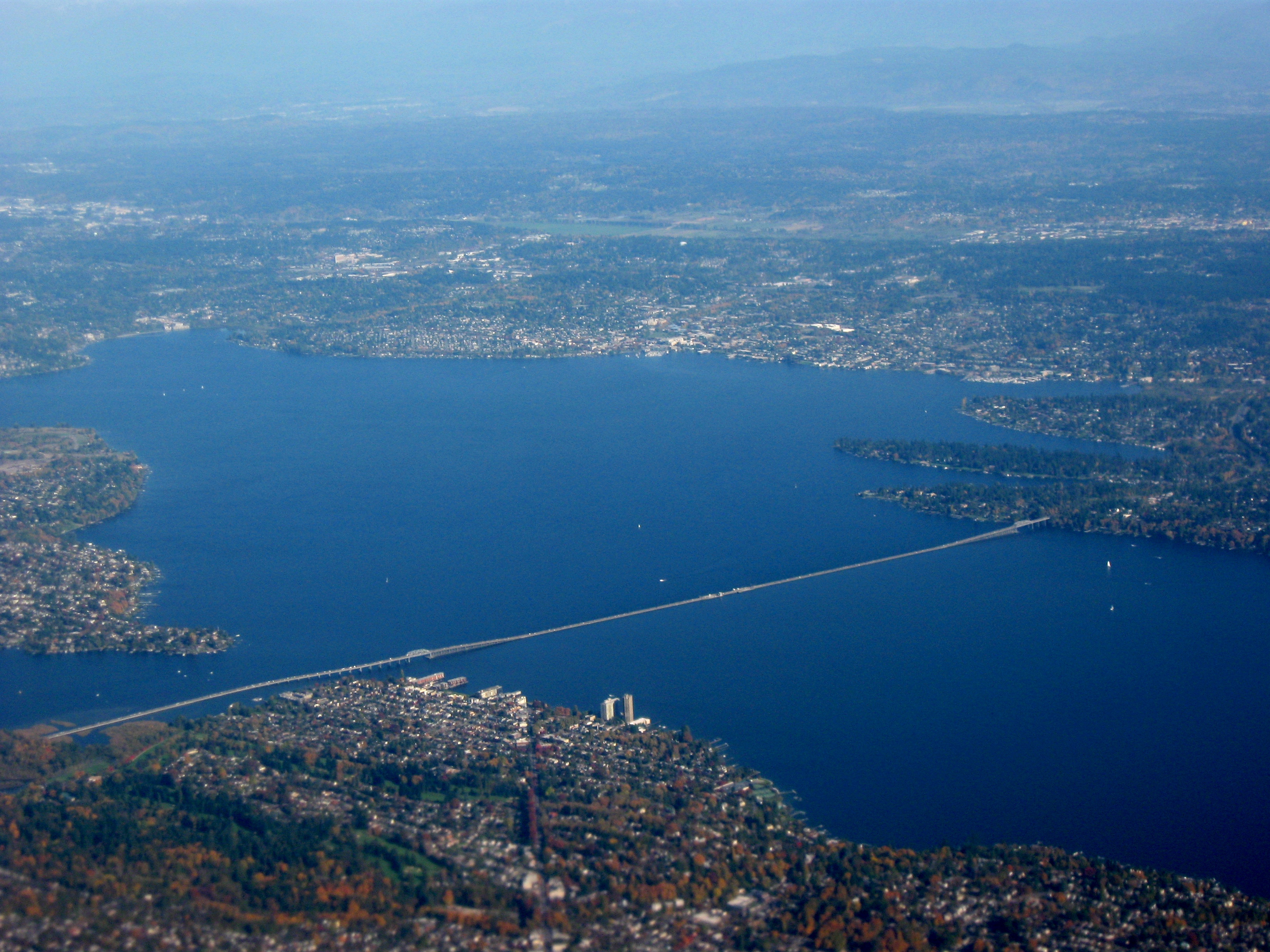
Lake Washington

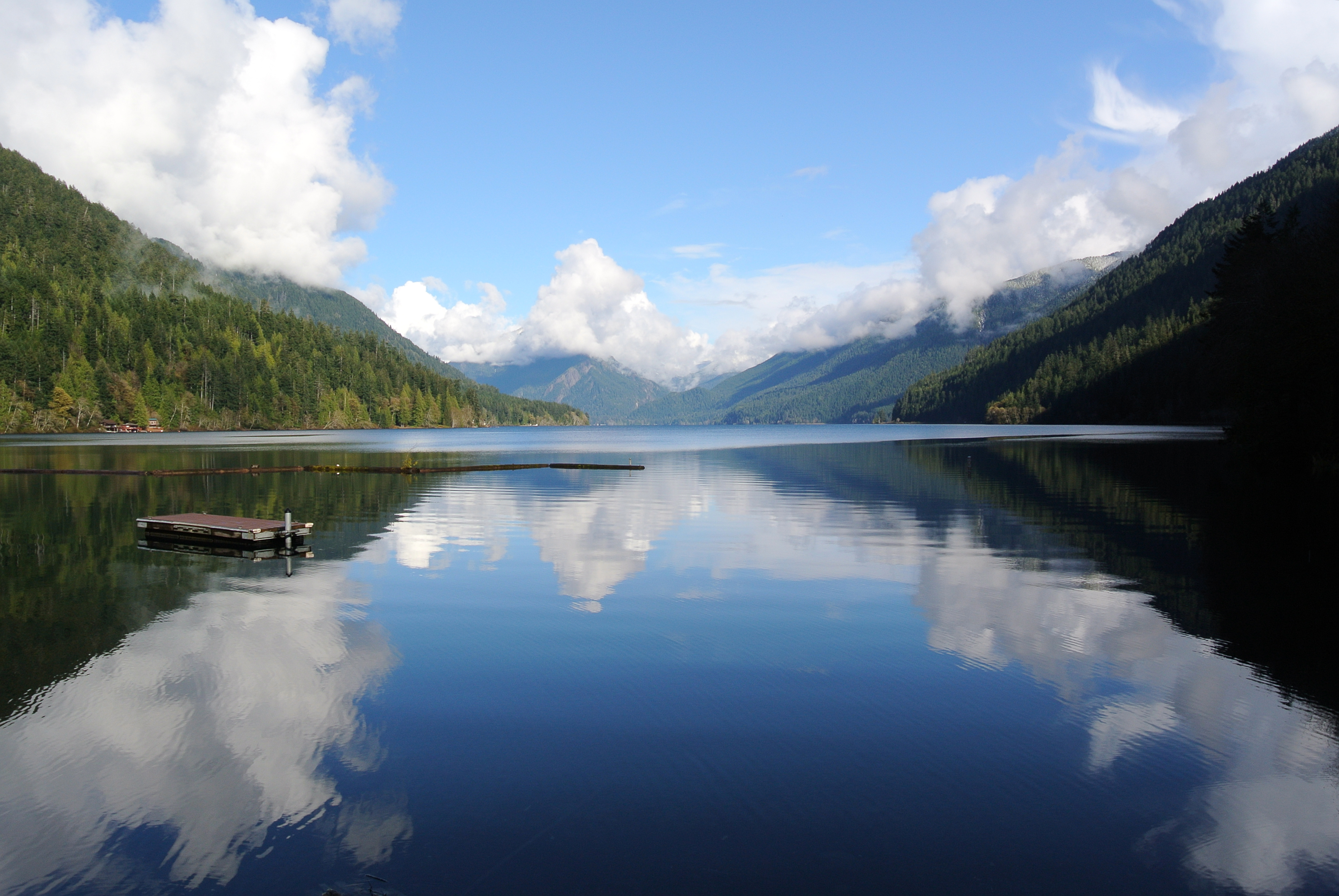
Lake Crescent

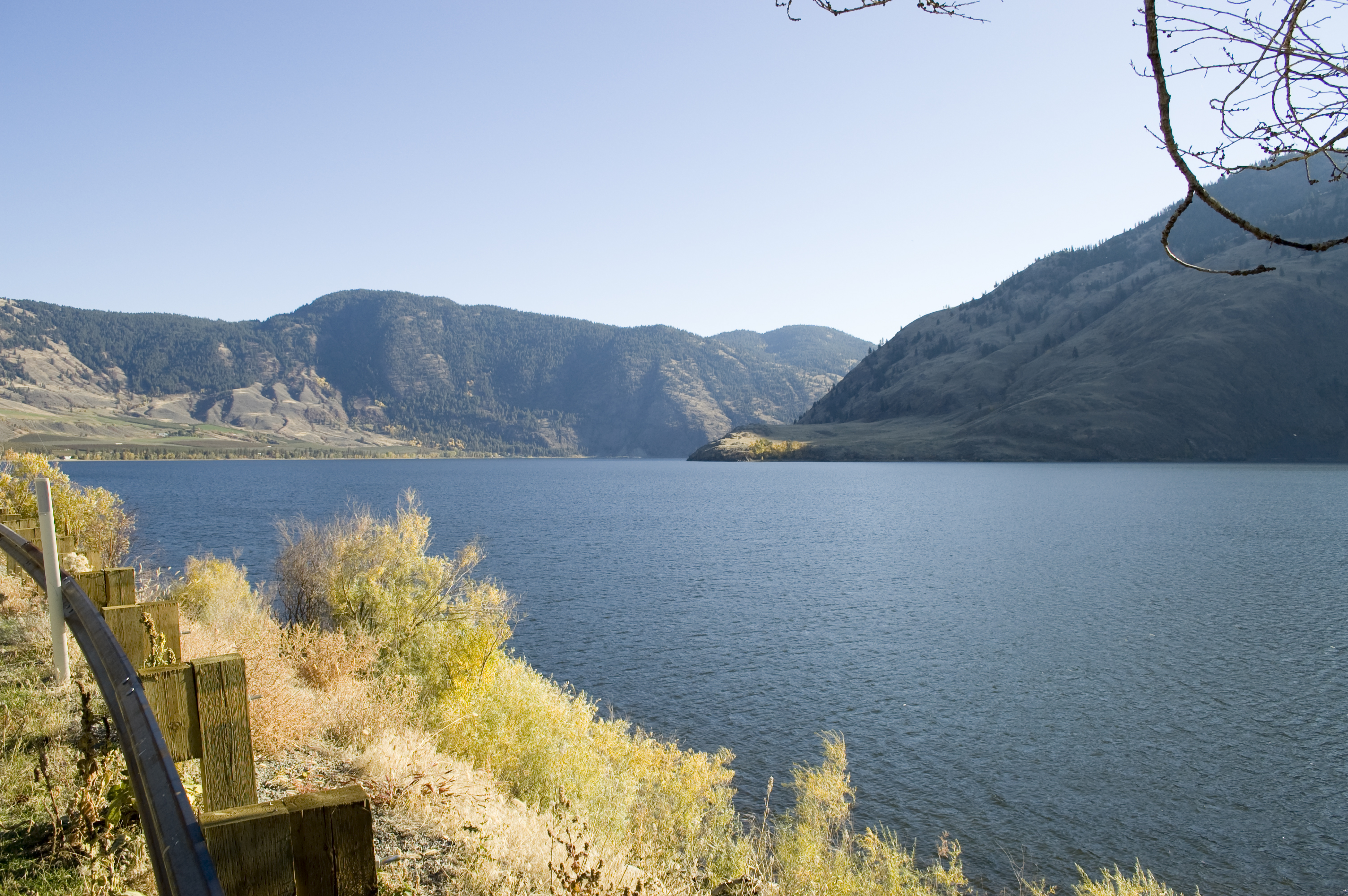
Palmer Lake

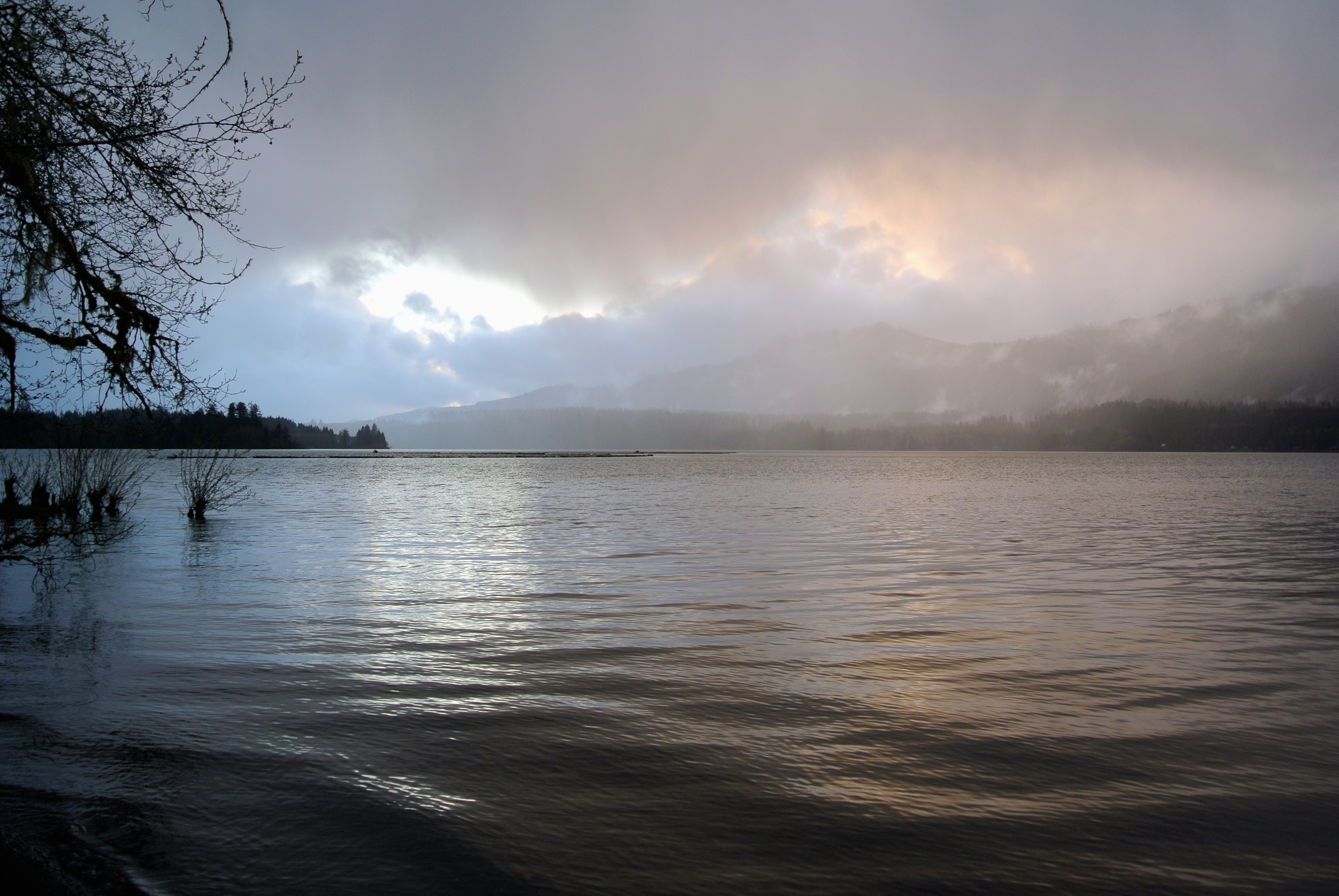
Lake Quinault

== Natural lakes ==
Currently included in this table are all natural and enhanced lakes with a surface area of more than 1,000 acres or a volume of more than 25,000 acre feet as well as smaller lakes (down to 100 acres) with a Wikipedia page.

| Name | County(s) | Elev. (ft) | Area (acres) | Volume (acre ft) | Depth (max)(ft) | Outflow | Basin | Coordinates | Notes | Reference |
|---|---|---|---|---|---|---|---|---|---|---|
| Lake Chelan | Chelan | 1,102 | 33,000 | 15,800,000 | 1,486 | Chelan River | Columbia / Chelan | 48°01′37″N 120°20′17″W | (Note: Enhanced with a dam in 1927.) | |
| Lake Washington | King | 17 | 22,000 | 2,400,000 | 214 | Lake Washington Ship Canal | Lake Washington | 47°37′19″N 122°15′22″W | (Note: Excluding Lake Union and connected waters.) | |
| Lake Ozette | Clallam | 33 | 7,400 | 960,000 | 331 | Ozette River | Ozette River | 48°05′42″N 124°38′13″W | (Note: Largest unaltered lake in Washington State) | |
| Moses Lake | Grant | 1,050 | 6,800 | 130,000 | 38 | Crab Creek | Columbia / Crab Creek | 47°07′26″N 119°20′20″W | (Note: Enhanced with dams in the early 1900s, 1928 and 1941 for irrigation purposes.) | |
| Osoyoos Lake | Okanogan / B.C.‡ | 911 | 5,800 | 270,000 | 208 | Okanogan River | Columbia / Okanogan | 49°00′00″N 119°26′38″W | (Note: The Zosel Dam, when built in 1927, unintentionally influenced and now regulates Osoyoos Lake levels.) | |
| Lake Crescent | Clallam | 584 | 5,100 | 1,500,000 | 624 | Lyre River | Lyre River | 48°03′36″N 123°49′41″W | (Note: Most voluminous unaltered lake in Washington State) | |
| Lake Whatcom | Whatcom | 312 | 4,900 | 770,000 | 328 | Whatcom Creek | Bellingham Bay | 48°44′02″N 122°19′52″W | (Note: Enhanced with dams in 1937.) | |
| Lake Sammamish | King | 30 | 4,900 | 284,000 | 105 | Sammamish River | Lake Washington | 47°35′38″N 122°05′53″W | | |
| Cle Elum Lake | Kittitas | 2,227 | 4,800 | 520,000 | 260 | Cle Elum River | Columbia / Yakima | 47°16′01″N 121°05′38″W | (Note: Enhanced with a dam in 1933 for irrigation purposes. Active capacity is 437,000 acre feet.) | |
| Baker Lake | Whatcom | 705 | 4,800 | 285,000 | | Baker River | Skagit River | 48°43′44″N 121°37′45″W | (Note: Enhanced with a dam in 1959.) | |
| Kachess Lake | Kittitas | 2,258 | 4,500 | 550,000 | 410 | Kachess River | Columbia / Yakima | 47°19′01″N 121°14′17″W | (Note: Enhanced with a dam in 1912 for irrigation purposes. Active capacity is 239,000 acre feet.) | |
| Lake Cushman | Mason | 739 | 4,010 | | 115 | Skokomish River | | 47°29′16″N 123°16′01″W | (Note: Enhanced with a dam ca. 1924.) | |
| Lake Quinault | Grays Harbor | 186 | 3,550 | 496,000 | 240 | Quinault River | Quinault River | 47°28′26″N 123°52′16″W | | |
| Omak Lake | Okanogan | 958 | 3,250 | 700,000 | 325 | None | Columbia Basin | 48°16′37″N 119°23′56″W | (Note: Saline lake.) | |
| Keechelus Lake | Kittitas | 2,521 | 2,600 | 250,000 | 310 | Yakima River | Columbia / Yakima | 47°19′37″N 121°21′07″W | (Note: Enhanced with a dam in 1917 for irrigation purposes. Active capacity is 158,000 acre feet.) | |
| Spirit Lake | Skamania | 3,440 | 2,600 | 212,000 | 110 | North Fork Toutle River | Columbia / Cowlitz | 46°16′08″N 122°08′28″W | (Note: The 1980 eruption of Mount St. Helens relocated the lake 300 feet higher. A drainage tunnel was built to prevent a catastrophic breach of the new natural dam.) | |
| Lake Wenatchee | Chelan | 1,872 | 2,500 | 360,000 | 244 | Wenatchee River | Columbia / Wenatchee | 47°49′23″N 120°46′41″W | | |
| Lake Tapps | Pierce | 546 | 2,430 | 47,000 | 90 | White River | Puyallup River | 47°12′50″N 122°10′08″W | (Note: Natural lake that was diked in 1911. With islands the surface area is about 2,800 acres.) | |
| Silver Lake | Cowlitz | 489 | 2,300 | 13,000 | 10 | Outlet Creek | Columbia / Cowlitz | 46°17′24″N 122°47′56″W | (Note: Natural lake, but dammed to prevent flooding.) | |
| Vancouver Lake | Clark | 8 | 2,300 | 6,900 | 15 | Lake River | Columbia Basin | 45°40′26″N 122°43′05″W | | |
| Rock Lake | Whitman | 1,728 | 2,200 | 380,000 | 350 | Rock Creek | Columbia / Snake | 47°10′55″N 117°40′48″W | (Note: Largest natural lake in South East Washington.) | |
| Palmer Lake | Okanogan | 1,150 | 2,100 | 110,000 | 79 | Palmer Creek | Columbia / Okanogan | 48°53′35″N 119°37′08″W | | |
| Twin Lakes | Ferry | 2,572 | 1,900 | 33,000 | 50 | Stranger Creek | Columbia Basin | 48°16′34″N 118°22′48″W | (Note: North and South Twin Lakes combined. Used as a reservoir for irrigation purposes since 1930.) | |
| Chester Morse Lake | King | 1,562 | 1,830 | 94,000 | 130 | Cedar River | Lake Washington | 47°23′13″N 121°42′11″W | (Note: Before it was expanded with the Masonry Dam in 1911, this lake was known as "Cedar Lake".) | |
| Sprague Lake | Adams / Lincoln | 1,882 | 1,800 | 19,000 | 20 | Cow Creek | Columbia / Snake | 47°15′36″N 118°03′58″W | | |
| Lenore Lake | Grant | 1,078 | 1,400 | 20,000 | 27 | Soap Lake | Columbia / Crab Creek | 47°29′13″N 119°31′01″W | | |
| Deer Lake | Stevens | 2,482 | 1,150 | 60,000 | 80 | Sheep Creek | Columbia / Colville | 48°06′43″N 117°35′13″W | | |
| American Lake | Pierce | 238 | 1,100 | 60,000 | 90 | Sequalitchew Creek | | 47°07′30″N 122°33′43″W | | |
| Loon Lake | Stevens | 2,385 | 1,100 | 51,000 | 105 | Sheep Creek | Columbia / Colville | 48°02′42″N 117°37′19″W | | |
| Newman Lake | Spokane | 2,130 | 1,100 | 23,000 | 30 | Newman Lake Peat Dike | | 47°46′37″N 117°06′04″W | | |
| Lake Stevens | Snohomish | 214 | 1,000 | 65,000 | 160 | Catherine Creek | Snohomish River | 48°00′14″N 122°05′06″W | | |
| Mason Lake | Mason | 197 | 1,000 | 49,000 | 90 | Sherwood Creek | Puget Sound | 47°20′06″N 122°57′29″W | | |
| Curlew Lake | Ferry | 2,354 | 920 | 40,000 | 130 | Curlew Creek | Columbia / Kettle | 48°44′02″N 118°39′58″W | | |
| Soap Lake | Grant | 1,074 | 850 | 29,000 | 95 | None | Columbia / Crab Creek | 47°24′22″N 119°29′49″W | | |
| Lake Cavanaugh | Skagit | 1,012 | 830 | 36,000 | 80 | Lake Creek | Stillaguamish River | 48°19′16″N 122°00′36″W | | |
| Lake Samish | Whatcom | 274 | 810 | 33,100 | 160 | Friday Creek | Bellingham Bay | 48°39′54″N 122°23′06″W | | |
| Coldwater Lake | Cowlitz / Skamania | 2,494 | 770 | 58,500 | 200 | Coldwater Creek | Columbia / Cowlitz | 46°18′11″N 122°14′24″W | | |
| Bead Lake | Pend Oreille | 2,833 | 720 | 77,000 | 180 | None | Columbia / Pend Oreille | 48°17′53″N 117°06′47″W | | |
| Liberty Lake | Spokane | 2,073 | 708 | | 30 | Spokane Valley-Rathdrum Prairie Aquifer | Columbia / Spokane | 47°38′42″N 117°04′41″W | | |
| Lake Union | King | 17 | 580 | 20,000 | 50 | Fremont Cut | Lake Washington | 47°38′28″N 122°20′06″W | (Note: Surface area and volume exclude the 150 acre Portage Bay as well as the Fremont Cut and Salmon Bay.) | |
| Buffalo Lake | Okanogan | 2,402 | 540 | 33,700 | 121 | None | Columbia Basin | 48°03′50″N 118°53′17″W | | |
| Lake Goodwin | Snohomish | 328 | 540 | 13,000 | 50 | Tulalip Creek | Puget Sound | 48°08′31″N 122°17′46″W | | |
| Summit Lake | Thurston | 459 | 510 | 28,000 | 100 | Kennedy Creek | Puget Sound | 47°03′22″N 123°06′11″W | | |
| Lake Kapowsin | Pierce | 585 | 510 | 8,300 | 29 | Kapowsin Creek | Puyallup River | 46°58′23″N 122°13′37″W | | |
| Lake Pleasant | Clallam | 397 | 500 | 16,000 | 50 | Lake Creek to Sol Duc River | Quillayute River | 48°03′50″N 124°19′44″W | | |
| Packwood Lake | Lewis | 2,857 | 450 | 28,000 | 120 | Lake Creek | Columbia / Cowlitz | 46°35′13″N 121°33′29″W | | |
| Walupt Lake | Lewis | 3,930 | 380 | 62,000 | 300 | Walupt Creek | Columbia / Cowlitz | 46°25′01″N 121°27′47″W | | |
| Lake Sutherland | Clallam | 528 | 360 | 21,000 | 86 | Indian Creek | Elwha River | 48°04′44″N 123°42′54″W | | |
| Lake Lawrence | Thurston | 429 | 330 | 4,400 | 26 | Deschutes River | Puget Sound | 46°51′07″N 122°34′16″W | | |
| Long Lake | Thurston | 160 | 310 | 3,900 | 21 | Woodland Creek | Puget Sound | 47°01′12″N 122°46′30″W | | |
| Conconully Lake | Okanogan | 2323 | 293 | | 110 | Salmon Creek | Okanogan River | 48°33′49″N 119°43′11″W | | |
| Lacamas Lake | Clark | 182 | 290 | 7,500 | 65 | Lacamas Creek | Columbia / Washougal | 45°37′01″N 122°25′34″W | (Note: Natural reservoir) | |
| Lake Sawyer | King | 498 | 286 | | 58 | Covington Creek | Duwamish | 47°19′59″N 122°02′16″W | | |
| Nahwatzel Lake | Mason | 456 | 270 | 4,600 | 25 | Outlet Creek -> Satsop River | Chehalis River | 47°14′31″N 123°19′59″W | | |
| Capitol Lake | Thurston | 3 | 270 | 2,400 | 20 | Budd Inlet | Puget Sound | 47°01′59″N 122°54′32″W | (Note: Tidal flats and estuary dammed in 1951. Reduced from an original 320 acres surface area by sedimentation.) | |
| Lake Dorothy | King | 3,062 | 260 | ca 15,000? | 160 | Miller River | Snohomish River | 47°34′48″N 121°23′10″W | | |
| Green Lake | King | 164 | 250 | 3,400 | 30 | Bef. 1916: Ravenna Creek | Lake Washington | 47°40′41″N 122°20′17″W | | |
| Lake Easton | Kittitas | 2,184 | 205 | 4,000 | 85 | Kachess River | Columbia / Yakima | 47°15′00″N 121°11′56″W | | |
| Angeline Lake | King | 4,613 | 184 | >20,000 | 412 | Angeline Falls, Foss River | Snohomish River | 47°34′16″N 121°18′25″W | | |
| Big Heart Lake | King | 4,549 | 176 | >20,000 | 449 | Big Heart Falls, Foss River | Snohomish River | 47°34′44″N 121°19′30″W | | |
| Silver Lake | Whatcom | 6,768 | 162 | ca 25,000? | 522 | Silver Creek | Skagit River | 48°59′17″N 121°13′55″W | | |
| Blanca Lake | Snohomish | 3,976 | 160 | 25,000 | 250 | Troublesome Creek | Snohomish River | 47°56′28″N 121°20′28″W | | |
| Snow Lake | King | 4,019 | 153 | 16,500 | 400 | Rock Creek | Snoqualmie River | 47°28′05″N 121°27′22″W | | |
| Lake Meridian | King | 372 | 150 | 6,100 | 90 | Big Soos Creek | Duwamish River | 47°21′47″N 122°09′11″W | | |
| Lake Padden | Whatcom | 450 | 149 | 4,300 | 59 | Padden Creek | Bellingham Bay | 48°42′11″N 122°27′14″W | | |
| Gravelly Lake | Pierce | 220 | 147 | 6,000 | 57 | None | Chambers Creek | 47°08′53″N 122°31′52″W | | |
| Chopaka Lake | Okanogan | 2,911 | 140 | 3,700 | 73 | Chopaka Creek | Columbia / Okanogan | 48°55′05″N 119°42′00″W | | |
| Snoqualmie Lake | King | 3,151 | 130 | ? | ? | Taylor River | Snoqualmie River | 47°34′01″N 121°24′47″W | | |
| Berdeen Lake | Whatcom | 5,018 | 126 | ca 10,000? | 212 | Berdeen Falls, Bacon Creek | Skagit River | 48°42′58″N 121°27′54″W | | |
| Mowich Lake | Pierce | 4,929 | 120 | ca 4,000? | 90 | Crater Creek | Puyallup River | 46°56′17″N 121°51′43″W | | |
| Rattlesnake Lake | King | 911 | 108 | 2,700 | 54 | None | Lake Washington | 47°25′48″N 121°46′30″W | | |
| Angle Lake | King | 351 | 103 | 2,600 | 52 | None | Duwamish River | 47°25′41″N 122°17′13″W | | |
| Lake Ballinger | Snohomish | 282 | 101 | 1,500 | 35 | McAleer Creek | Lake Washington | 47°46′55″N 122°19′37″W | | |
| Horseshoe Lake | Kitsap | 273 | 41 | | 30 | Burley Creek | Puget Sound | 47°24′30″N 122°39′52″W | | |
| Battle Ground Lake | Clark | 509 | 25 | | 60 | Salmon Creek | Columbia / Salmon Creek | 45°48′16″N 122°29′40″W | | |
| Round Lake | Clark | | | | | Lacamas Creek | Columbia / Washougal | 45°36′07″N 122°24′11″W | | |
| Doubtful Lake | Chelan | | | | | | | 48.4740347°N 121.0476972°W | | |
| Dagger Lake | Chelan | | | | | | | 48.4681455°N 120.6551062°W | | |
| Howard Lake | Chelan | | | | | | | 48.388601°N 120.83345°W | | |
| Green View Lake | Chelan | | | | | | | 48.4682456°N 120.8936430°W | | |

== Reservoirs ==
| Name | County(s) | Coordinates | Total storage (acre feet) | Surface area (acres) | Max depth (feet) | Outflow |
|---|---|---|---|---|---|---|
| Franklin D. Roosevelt Lake | Douglas, Ferry, Stevens, Lincoln, Grant, Okanogan | 47°56′46.2″N 118°55′56″W | 9,386,000 | 79,400 | 400 | Columbia River |
| Lake Umatilla | Klickitat, Sherman (OR)†, Gilliam (OR)†, Morrow (OR)†, Benton, Umatilla (OR)† | 45°43′32″N 120°12′44″W | | 48,738 | | Columbia River |
| Riffe Lake | Lewis | 46°27′59″N 122°16′4″W | 1,686,300 | 11,830 | 360 | Cowlitz River |
| Alder Lake | Pierce, Thurston | 46°46′15″N 122°16′20″W | | 3065 | 290 | Nisqually River |
| Ross Lake | Whatcom, British Columbia‡ | 48°52′6″N 121°1′47″W | 1,435,000 | 11,700 | | Skagit River |
| Lake Wallula | Benton, Walla Walla, Umatilla (OR)† | 45°57′17″N 119°3′53″W | 1,350,000 | 42,500 | | Columbia River |
| Banks Lake | Grant, Douglas | 47°48′21″N 119°11′31″W | 1,275,000 | 26,877 | 177 | |
| Swift Reservoir | Skamania | 46°3′20″N 122°6′51″W | 755,600 | 4,585 | | Lewis River |
| Wanapum Lake | Kittitas, Grant | 46°55′56″N 119°58′24″W | 669,700 | 14,590 | | Columbia River |
| Rufus Woods Lake | Douglas, Chelan | 47°59′47″N 119°37′14″W | 590,199 | 7,800 | | Columbia River |
| Lake Herbert G. West | Walla Walla, Columbia, Whitman, Franklin | 46°34′18″N 118°31′6″W | 432,000 | 6,590 | | Snake River |
| Merwin Lake | Clark, Cowlitz | 45°58′35″N 122°31′35″W | 416,000 | 3,836 | 190 | Lewis River |
| Yale Lake | Clark, Cowlitz | 46°0′43″N 122°18′44″W | 401,760 | 3,612 | | Lewis River |
| Potholes Reservoir | Grant | 46°59′59″N 119°17′6″W | 332,200 | 27,800 | | |

Key
† denotes that body of water crosses state border
‡ denotes that body of water crosses international border

== See also ==
- List of dams in the Columbia River watershed
- List of dams and reservoirs in the United States#Washington
