= La Stella =

La Stella may refer to:

- Tommy La Stella, American baseball player
- La Stella Restaurant, Italian restaurant in Forest Hills, Queens, New York
- La Stella Restaurant meeting, 1966, famous convocation of the American mafia at the above restaurant
- La Stella Winery, British Columbia, Canada
