= Schumacher Creek =

Stream in Washington state

Coordinates: 47°19′07″N 122°59′12″W

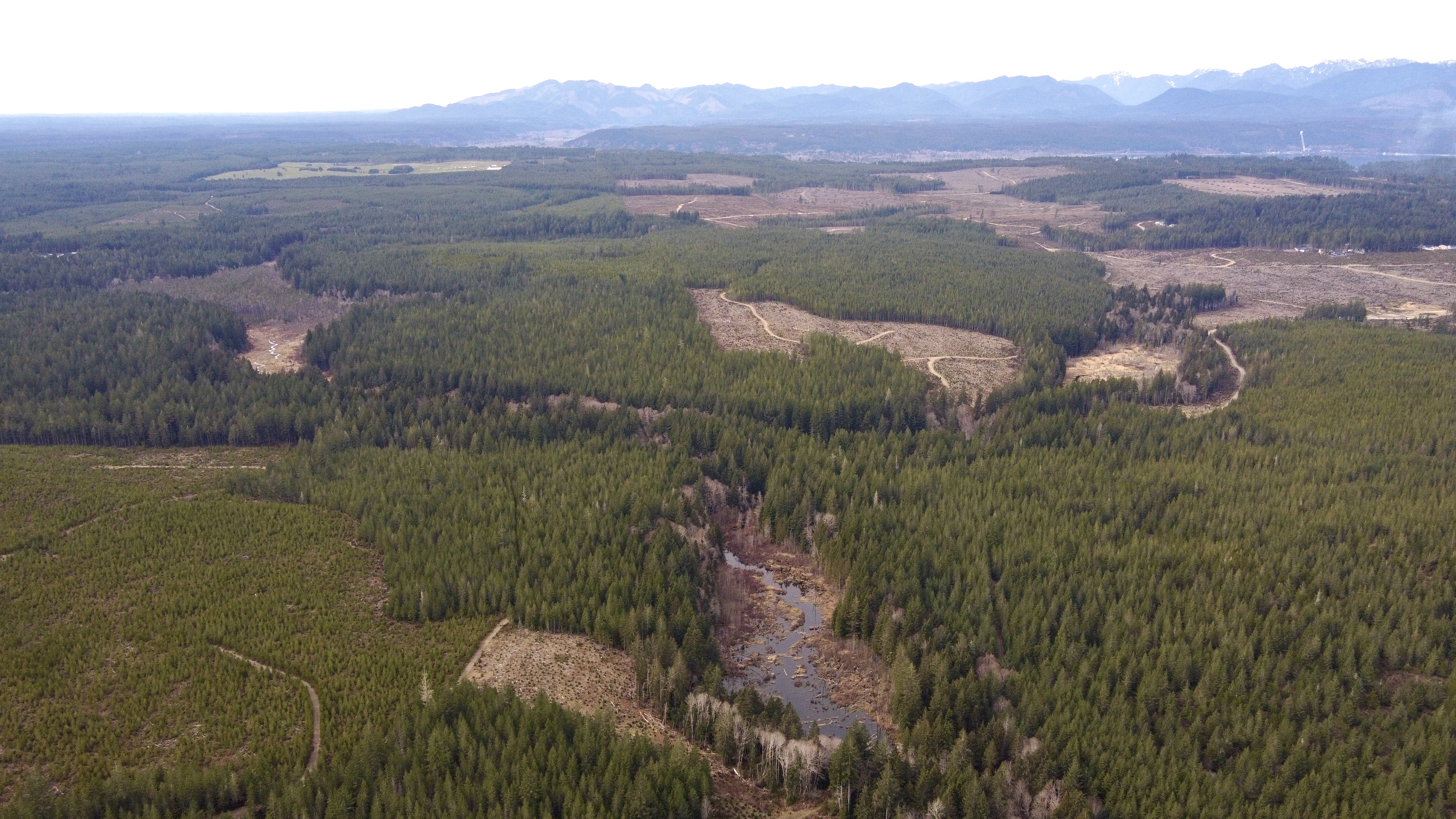
Drone photo of the Schumacher Creek Natural Area Preserve (left)

Schumacher Creek, formerly Shumocher Creek, is a creek in Mason County in the U.S. state of Washington. It flows into Mason Lake on the traditional territory of the Squaxin Island Tribe. Schumacher Creek is part of the Sherwood Creek watershed, and contains Trask Lake and Carson Lake.

== Land use and ecology ==
The Schumacher Creek watershed consists largely of industrial timberlands owned by Green Diamond Resource Company, which leases the area out to dirtbike riders and manages most of the watershed as a commercial tree farm. The headwaters of Schumacher Creek was purchased from the company by the Washington State Department of Natural Resources as a natural area preserve (NAP) in 2002. The DNR purchased 425 acres for $1,162,000. The preserve is now over 499 acres, as the DNR has purchased additional lands from a subdivision to the south. The preserve protects the Sitka alder/skunk cabbage-water parsley plant community which is only found in the Puget lowlands and is critically imperiled. The watershed has been heavily impacted by clear-cut logging, but has little residential development with the exception of the north western part of the watershed which contains part of the Alderbrook Golf Course, and part of the Timber Tides subdivision.

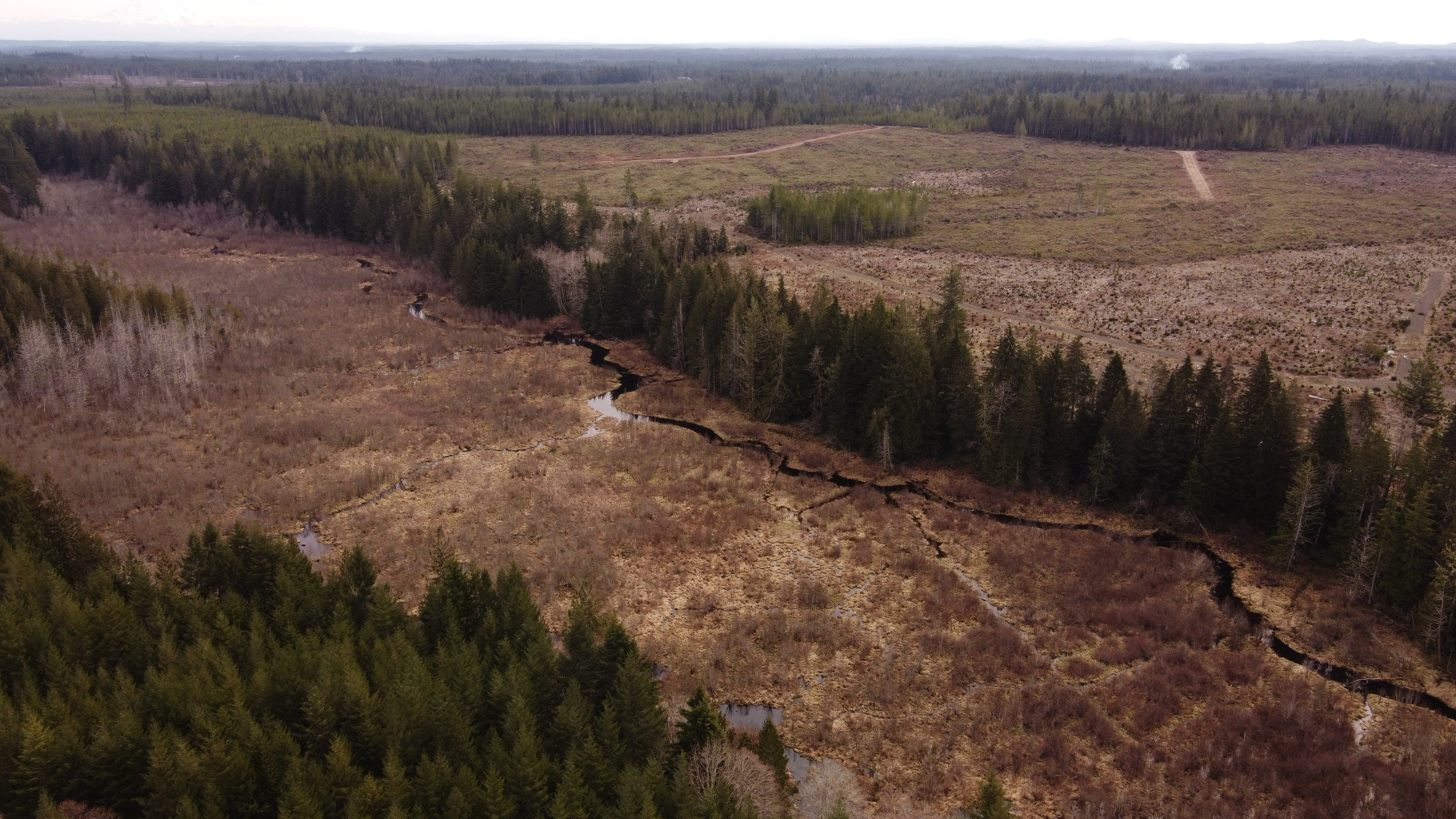
Logging adjacent to Schumacher Creek

The watershed contains a small section of old growth forest at its outlet into Mason Lake where Green Diamond Resource Company operates an Employee Recreation Area on the banks of Mason Lake which is not open to the public.

Schumacher Creek is spawning habitat for Sockeye salmon but timber harvest along the creek has affected the functionality of the shoreline habitat

Other large landowners in the watershed include the logging company Merrell and Ring and a local ranch. The Tacoma power transmission lines from Lake Cushman bisect the north portion of the watershed and a natural gas pipeline owned by Cascade Natural Gas crosses the watershed, including at one location where it crosses directly beneath Schumacher Creek, interrupting the riparian habitat of the shoreline.
