= Pierre Lake =

Pierre Lake may refer to:

- Pierre Lake (Ontario)
- Pierre Lake (Washington)
