= Alaskan Bush People =

American reality television series

- Genre: Reality
- Starring: Brown Family
- Narrated by: Asa Siegel
- Country of origin: United States
- Original language: English
- No. of seasons: 14
- No. of episodes: 114

Production
- Production locations: Chichagof Island, Alaska; Palmer Lake, Washington
- Running time: Approx. 42 minutes
- Production company: Park Slope Productions

Original release
- Network: Discovery Channel
- Release: May 6, 2014 – December 4, 2022

Alaskan Bush People is an American docudrama-style reality television series that follows the Brown family in an attempt to survive in the remote wilderness, apart from modern society. The series premiered on the Discovery Channel on May 6, 2014. Filmed on location in Alaska near Copper Center, Hoonah, and Chichagof Island, with later seasons filmed on location in Okanogan County, Washington, it follows the extended Brown family's life. Although purportedly a genuine reality TV show, it has been criticized for being scripted and/or fake.

In April 2019, Radar Online learned that the show was renewed for a 10th season. On November 13, the show was renewed for season 11, which premiered on December 4, 2019. Season 12 premiered on August 23, 2020. In August 2020, cast member Bear Brown posted on Instagram saying that the family's home had been destroyed in the 2020 Washington wildfires. Patriarch Billy Brown died at age 68 on February 7, 2021, after suffering a seizure. Cast member Matt Brown was reported missing on May 27, 2026; the same day the Okanogan County Sheriff's Office of Okanogan County, Washington, issued a press release about a report of an unnamed individual taking their life in shallow waters of the Okanogan River. Family members reported Matt Brown's body to be recovered from the river on May 30, 2026, and confirmed by the sheriff's office the following day.

== Background ==
The series follows the Brown family of Hoonah, Alaska, as they build lives together off the grid in Alaska.

== Episodes ==
=== Series overview ===
Season	Episodes	Originally released	
Season	Episodes	First released	Last released
1	5	May 6, 2014	June 15, 2014
2	8	January 2, 2015	February 20, 2015
3	8	May 22, 2015	July 24, 2015
4	8	November 11, 2015	January 6, 2016
5	10	May 6, 2016	July 15, 2016
6	8	January 4, 2017	February 22, 2017
7	8	June 21, 2017	August 23, 2017
8	9	August 19, 2018	September 30, 2018
9	5	March 3, 2019	March 31, 2019
10	7	August 4, 2019	September 15, 2019
11	8	December 4, 2019	January 29, 2020
12	8	August 23, 2020	October 11, 2020
13	11	September 19, 2021	November 21, 2021
14	11	October 2, 2022	December 4, 2022

=== Season 1 (2014) ===
No. overall	No. in season	Title	Original release date
1	1	"Raised Wild"	May 6, 2014
A unique family of nine chooses to live off the grid in the Alaskan bush.
2	2	"Human Wolf Pack"	May 13, 2014
The Brown brothers travel to town for supplies after months of seclusion.
3	3	"Blindsided"	May 20, 2014
Frigid conditions hit Alaska as the Brown family races to finish their cabin. Illness strikes and the brothers must scramble to gather essential supplies before winter comes.
4	4	"Fight or Flight"	May 27, 2014
The Brown family deal with an unforeseen confrontation while filming.
5	5	"The Wild Life"	June 15, 2014
The Brown family reflect on their experience the past year.

=== Season 2 (2015) ===
No. overall	No. in season	Title	Original release date
6	1	"Breaking Free"	January 2, 2015
After being stuck in Ketchikan, the Browns are ready to return to the wild; a series of emergencies keep the family trapped.
7	2	"Return to the Wild"	January 9, 2015
The Browns are determined to make it to their new piece of land.
8	3	"Welcome to Browntown"	January 16, 2015
The Brown boys are challenged when tasked with setting up the home site.
9	4	"Birdy Get Your Gun"	January 23, 2015
Birdy braves bear territory to provide food for the family.
10	5	"Pile It On"	January 30, 2015
The Browns endure significant setbacks after a major storm hits.
11	6	"On the Prowl"	February 6, 2015
While grabbing lunch in town, the boys meet some local girls.
12	7	"Home Alone"	February 13, 2015
After Billy falls ill, the kids are left to fend for themselves.
13	8	"Now or Never"	February 20, 2015
The Browns experience a series of setbacks while building their home.

=== Season 3 (2015) ===
No. overall	No. in season	Title	Original release date
14	1	"A Wolfpack Divided"	May 22, 2015
Ami needs medical attention while boys search for a wood-burning stove.
15	2	"Rise of Browntown"	June 5, 2015
Ami tries to find mates for her five boys with the help of a matchmaker.
16	3	"Divide and Conquer"	June 12, 2015
Matt and Bam hunt for meat while the other Brown kids look for chickens.
17	4	"Bloodlines"	June 19, 2015
Ami is forced to confront her past and the life she left behind years ago.
18	5	"A Big Gamble"	June 26, 2015
The potential purchase of a boat leaves the Brown family conflicted.
19	6	"Rocky Seas"	July 3, 2015
Billy and three of his sons head home on the old boat they just purchased.
20	7	"Sink or Swim"	July 17, 2015
The Browns face many challenges during the boat's maiden voyage.
21	8	"Never Give Up"	July 24, 2015
The Browns get their first official job for the hauling business.

=== Season 4 (2015–16) ===
No. overall	No. in season	Title	Original release date
22	1	"Block & Tackle"	November 11, 2015
The Browns' hauling business suffers from a lumber shortage.
23	2	"Shots Fired"	November 18, 2015
The Browns are tested when trying to stay on track with winter prep.
24	3	"Rock, Paper, Skipper"	November 25, 2015
Billy makes an unexpected choice that changes the lives of the Wolfpack.
25	4	"Ballad of Billy Brown"	December 2, 2015
In honor of Billy's birthday, the family sets up a series of celebrations
26	5	"Dock-u-Drama"	December 9, 2015
Matt, Bam, Bear, and Gabe head out on a hauling job without their father.
27	6	"Dead in the Water"	December 16, 2015
Engine trouble prevents Matt, Bam, Gabe, and Bear from heading home.
28	7	"Alarmed & Dangerous"	December 30, 2015
The Brown brothers try to redeem themselves after a failed hauling job.
29	8	"Bush Heart"	January 6, 2016
In Browntown, circumstances force a decision that affects the whole family.

=== Season 5 (2016) ===
No. overall	No. in season	Title	Original release date
30	1	"The Wolfpack Returns"	May 6, 2016
The family returns to Browntown and must work hard to get back on track
31	2	"Driving Miss Rainy"	May 13, 2016
The Wolfpack takes on a risky job to secure a skiff they desperately need.
32	3	"Winter Watch"	May 20, 2016
The Browns visit Excursion Inlet and face unforeseen challenges.
33	4	"Growing the Wolfpack"	May 27, 2016
A visitor from Billy's past brings uncertainty to the Wolfpack.
34	5	"Surviving the Lower 48"	June 3, 2016
The Brown's embrace their wild side while they explore the lower-48.
35	6	"High Tide Housing"	June 10, 2016
A visit from the mayor of Hoonah could change the face of Browntown.
36	7	"Shots in the Dark"	June 17, 2016
The Wolfpack is on high alert after mysterious shots are fired.
37	8	"Judgement Day"	June 24, 2016
The Browns are forced to leave the bush for an unknown fate in Juneau.
38	9	"Released to the Wild"	July 8, 2016
After 30 long days in Juneau, the Brown family reunites.
39	10	"Back in Browntown"	July 15, 2016
The Browns return to Browntown ready to reclaim the bush.

=== Season 6 (2017) ===
No. overall	No. in season	Title	Original release date
40	1	"All That Matters"	January 4, 2017
Matt returns while a dangerous storm overtakes Chichagof island.
41	2	"Bear With Us"	January 11, 2017
The Browns protect their newest member from hungry bears.
42	3	"Browntown Boom"	January 18, 2017
The Browns embark on their biggest project to date.
43	4	"Dead in the Water"	January 25, 2017
The Browns face turbulent weather as they try to accomplish a haul.
44	5	"One Brown Down"	February 1, 2017
The Browns face unbelievable odds as the navigate through open water.
45	6	"All Falls Down"	February 8, 2017
Matt builds a storage unit for the family to store food and supplies.
46	7	"Field of Dreams"	February 15, 2017
Billy scrambles during a last minute barter deal.
47	8	"Wind and a Prayer"	February 22, 2017
The Browns face many obstacles when closing a deal on a wind turbine.

=== Season 7 (2017) ===
No. overall	No. in season	Title	Original release date
48	1	"Faith and Family"	June 21, 2017
Noah braves the dangers of the wilderness to defend the homestead.
49	2	"The Long Road"	June 28, 2017
A major medical diagnosis shakes the Brown family.
50	3	"Strength In Numbers"	July 5, 2017
The Browns navigate the possibility of leaving their lifelong dream behind.
51	4	"Unanchored"	July 12, 2017
The Browns await treatment options for Ami.
52	5	"Weight of the Wolfpack"	July 19, 2017
As Ami awaits treatment, the Wolfpack is left to pack up the homestead.
53	6	"Bush Code"	August 9, 2017
After leaving Browntown, the kids are faced with a critical decision
54	7	"A New Chapter"	August 16, 2017
Bear, Bird and Rain work together to search for a homestead in the bush.
55	8	"Blazing a New Trail"	August 23, 2017
The family leaves Browntown looking forward to a fresh start.

=== Season 8 (2018) ===
No. overall	No. in season	Title	Original release date
56	1	"Back to the Bush"	August 19, 2018
The Browns journey to their new property to start their next adventure.
57	2	"Breaking Ground"	August 26, 2018
The Browns begin an ambitious barn build and Noah returns home.
58	3	"Head Above Water"	September 2, 2018
The Browns are faced with the threat of major flooding.
59	4	"Call to Duty"	September 9, 2018
Billy gives daughter Rain major new responsibilities.
60	5	"Bird and the Bees"	September 16, 2018
Ami prepares for a critical check up. Bears destroy Bam's new beehives.
61	6	"Family First"	September 23, 2018
The family confronts Bam after he becomes distracted with his own projects.
62	7	"Where There's Smoke There's Fire"	September 30, 2018
Noah becomes the first one married and wildfires threaten the homestead.
63	8	"A New Beginning"	September 30, 2018
Matt leaves for second alcohol withdrawal. Noah and Rhain Alisha get married.

=== Season 9 (2019) ===
No. overall	No. in season	Title	Original release date
64	1	"Bull by the Horns"	March 3, 2019
The Wolfpack's quest for freedom takes a big step forward with livestock.
65	2	"The Buffalo Trail"	March 10, 2019
The Wolfpack prepares to stockpile meat with their first ever buffalo hunt.
66	3	"Beware the Bear-Crow"	March 17, 2019
The Wolfpack devises inventive solutions to defend their livestock.
67	4	"Mountain Emergency"	March 24, 2019
The Wolfpack is forced to be resourceful after a medical emergency.
68	5	"Winter Is Here"	March 31, 2019
The browns make a risky attempt to bring Billy home as snow begins to fall.

=== Season 10 (2019) ===
No. overall	No. in season	Title	Original release date
69	1	"King of the Mountain"	August 4, 2019
A snowstorm threatens progress as the Wolfpack hauls Bear's new home.
70	2	"The Wolfpack vs. the Wolf"	August 11, 2019
The Browns discover a dangerous new predator stalking their ranch.
71	3	"Clear and Pheasant Danger"	August 18, 2019
The Wolfpack's first pheasant hunt turns into a competition.
72	4	"Fowl Weather Friends"	August 25, 2019
Birdi goes on a treacherous hunt to bring home meat and save her chickens.
73	5	"The Chaos Before the Storm"	September 1, 2019
A big winter storm forces Noah and Rhain Alisha to make a tough decision.
74	6	"The Big Push"	September 8, 2019
The Browns struggle to finish their homes as the ground begins to freeze.
75	7	"The Wild New Wild"	September 15, 2019
Discover if the Wolfpack has wat it takes to conquer Washington.

=== Season 11 (2019–20) ===
No. overall	No. in season	Title	Original release date
76	1	"Wind and Water"	December 4, 2019
The Browns kick off their most ambitious plan to conquer the mountain yet.
77	2	"Bears of a Feather"	December 11, 2019
Three young ostriches attract hungry bears to the homestead.
78	3	"Storm's Fury"	December 18, 2019
The first major storm of the season threatens the family's progress.
79	4	"A Very Bush Wedding"	January 1, 2020
The Wolfpack prepares for their first ever wedding in the bush.
80	5	"Bam Bam's Big Build and Bears"	January 8, 2020
Bam plays nice with his siblings to finally break ground on his homestead.
81	6	"Bear Meets Girl"	January 15, 2020
Bear gets visitor and the family celebrates a special date.
82	7	"Noah's Animal Ark"	January 22, 2020
The Browns devise ingenious new safety measures while fleeing from a storm.
83	8	"Where There's Water There's a Way"	January 29, 2020
Billy gets earth-shattering news for the Wolfpack and Bear goes on a hunt.

=== Season 12 (2020) ===
No. overall	No. in season	Title	Original release date
84	1	"Life in the Extreme"	August 23, 2020
The Browns scramble to pull off an "extreme" wedding on the mountain.
85	2	"Rumble in the Bush"	August 30, 2020
Gabe is attacked by an aggressive ostrich and loses one of his most prized possessions in the process; the ranch gets hit with the first snowfall, the family builds a big bonfire to unfreeze the ground under their house site.
86	3	"Range Ridin'"	September 6, 2020
When the ranch comes under fire from encroaching hunters, Gabe takes it upon himself to learn to ride a horse as the family constructs a fence around the property; Gabe and Raquell leave the mountain for the birth of their baby girl.
87	4	"Bush Below Zero"	September 13, 2020
The Browns build livestock shelters before a cold front comes through.
88	5	"Water to Ice"	September 20, 2020
A deep freeze halts the water supply, sending the ranch into a new crisis.
89	6	"A Bottle for Your Thoughts"	September 27, 2020
Bear overnights in the wild and Bird makes Gabe an unusual gift.
90	7	"The Land Giveths and Takeths"	October 4, 2020
The Browns complete the main house before a massive wildfire strikes.
91	8	"Faith & Fury"	October 11, 2020
A wildfire rages on Palmer Mountain, threatening the Brown's livelihoods.

=== Season 13 (2021) ===
No. overall	No. in season	Title	Original release date
92	1	"Wild Wild Wonderland"	September 19, 2021
Billy rallies the family toward the next stage of North Star Ranch.
93	2	"Scorched Earth"	September 19, 2021
The Wolfpack questions the future of their dream after a ruinous wildfire.
94	3	"Little River and the Big Sea"	September 26, 2021
Bear meets son River for the first time and Bird contemplates a journey.
95	4	"Back to Browntown"	October 3, 2021
Bird, Bear and Rain return to Alaska to reconnect with their bush past.
96	5	"The Storm and the Sea"	October 10, 2021
An incoming storm threatens to cut the siblings Alaska trip short.
97	6	"Browntown Boomtown"	October 17, 2021
The Wolfpack grieves a loss while building a new "Boomtown" basecamp.
98	7	"Bringing Up Babies"	October 24, 2021
Young father Bear welcome River to North Star for the first time.
99?	8	"One Last Dance, Da'"	October 31, 2021
The Wolfpack faces difficult next steps after the death of Billy.
100	9	"Millon-Dollar Mountain"	November 7, 2021
The Browns salvage 80-tons of old mining equipment as gold fever strikes.
101	10	"Heart of Gold"	November 14, 2021
The Browns meet their match bringing salvaged mining equipment to life.
102	11	"All for One"	November 21, 2021
The Wolfpack celebrate Billy but some question the future without him.

=== Season 14 (2022) ===
No. overall	No. in season	Title	Original release date
103	1	"A New Crossroad"	October 2, 2022
The Browns begin their new spring with differing ambitions.
104	2	"Heart of a Wolf"	October 3, 2022
Crisis strikes another member of the Wolfpack.
105	3	"Growing Pains"	October 10, 2022
Gabe leads a risky salvage job while Bird fights to return to Alaska.
106	4	"Coming Home"	October 17, 2022
The siblings adventure north to Alaska to kick of a property hunt.
107	5	"The Alaskan Code"	October 24, 2022
Noah risks losing a dream property to help an Alaskan bush family in need.
108	6	"No Sleep Till Petersburg"	October 31, 2022
With the clock ticking, the Brown siblings face boat trouble in Alaska.
109	7	"Stormy Straight and Narrows"	November 7, 2022
The Browns fight stormy seas en route to storied Mosman Island.
110	8	"All Aboard the Barter Train"	November 14, 2022
Noah must complete a tricky barter to secure an ideal Alaskan home.
111	9	"Gabe Against the Machine"	November 21, 2022
The Wolfpack juggles three big projects that compete for resources.
112	10	"Gold Blooded Browns"	November 28, 2022
The Browns assemble their goldmining rig and set up a first longhorn sale.
113	11	"A Golden Future"	December 4, 2022
The Browns strive to turn their dream of mining on the ranch into reality.

== Specials ==
Featured season	Title	Original release date
1	"Back to the Bush - A Family of Nine"	July 15, 2014
The Brown family reveals their unique Christmas traditions out in the Alaskan bush. They also reflect on the past year as well as what's on the horizon for the family.
1	"Back to the Bush - The Race Is On"	July 25, 2014
1	"Back to the Bush - The Big Decision"	July 29, 2014
2	"A Very Bush Christmas"	December 19, 2014
The Brown family reveals their unique Christmas traditions out in the Alaskan bush. They also reflect on the past year as well as what's on the horizon for the family.
3	"Wild Times"	May 22, 2015
The Family look back on their life in the wild and talk about memorable and extreme moments from the show.
3	"Lost Footage"	July 31, 2015
Never before seen footage from season 2.
3	"The Wild Year"	August 7, 2015
The Brown family looks back on the last year of their lives. From their time in Ketchikan until the present, they reflect upon their crazy journey and respond to burning questions viewers have about events that have happened over the course of the season.
3	"Endless Summer"	November 4, 2015
Never before seen footage and an exclusive sneak peek of the upcoming season.
4	"Return to the Bush"	January 3, 2016
The Browns try to find their way back to the bush after their boat is sunk.
4	"Paradise Lost"	January 6, 2016
This special features a look back at the Brown’s first summer on Chichagof Island.
5	"Browntown or Bust"	April 29, 2016
As the Browns return home from the Lower 48, we look back on what they miss the most about Alaska. Also never before seen footage and an exclusive sneak peeks of the new season.
5	"Browns Down South"	July 22, 2016
In this special episode, a deeper look into the Brown's time spent down south. And in never before seen footage brothers Bear and Bam commemorate their time in the Lower 48 in an extreme way.
5	"Made in the Wild"	July 29, 2016
A look behind the lens at the countless hours spent to bring bush life to the lower 48 and how Brown luck influences what makes it to air.
6	"A Browntown Christmas"	December 7, 2016
Join the Brown family as they celebrate Christmas, Alaskan Bush style.
6	"Browntown Bound"	December 28, 2016
It is the end of one of the toughest years the Brown family has had in the wilderness of Alaska.
6	"Harsh Wilderness"	March 1, 2017
Having a well-functioning homestead takes massive amounts of ingenuity and hard work, something The Browns have worked tirelessly to achieve.
6	"Forever Browntown"	March 8, 2017
As the modern world encroaches on Southeast Alaska, the Browns fight to prove that the bush way of life is worth saving.
6	"Heart of the Browns"	March 15, 2017
7	"One for All"	June 14, 2017
The Browns continue to work hard and tirelessly to gather food, secure resources and build everything from scratch in their pursuit of a self-sustaining town and being more isolated and independent than ever before.
7	"From the Ground Up"	June 16, 2017
The Brown family continues to work hard to build everything from scratch in their pursuit of a self-sustaining town.
7	"Forging a New Future"	September 21, 2017
As Ami prepares to undergo treatment for lung cancer, siblings Bear, Bird and Rain work to give the family's homestead back to the bush; the entire wolfpack must forge a new beginning using the skills they acquired in the Alaskan wilderness.
7	"Home Away for the Holidays"	December 15, 2017
While the Browns anxiously await rebuilding in the Lower 48, they get into the Christmas spirit with a special surprise for mother Ami.
7	"A Very Brown Christmas in Alaska"	December 23, 2017
8	"Unbreakable Will"	August 19, 2018
The Browns prepare for a new adventure in the remote wilderness of the Pacific Northwest, following unprecedented obstacles over the past year.
8	"Secrets of the Bush"	August 26, 2018
As the Wolfpack attempts to start over from the ground up, they reveal the relationships and values from decades in the wild, where they learned a way of life unique to the bush of Alaska.
8	"Chasing the Wolfpack"	September 30, 2018
For the first time ever, film crews reveal the risk and reward of following the nine member Brown Family in the wilderness from Alaska to the Pacific Northwest.
9	"This Land is Our Land"	March 1, 2019
Never before seen footage and exclusive insight reveal how the Browns struggle during their first Spring on the mountain.
10	"Secrets of the Hunt"	September 22, 2019
Over decades in the Alaskan bush, the Browns have developed their own unique tricks and secrets to hunt like only the Wolfpack can.
10	"Never Surrender"	September 29, 2019
11	"Growing Pains"	November 27, 2019
The Wolf Pack risks everything to transform the raw wilderness into a working ranch; as they grow faster than expected, the family is forced to evolve in ways they never imagined.
11	"Let the Feast Begin"	November 27, 2019
11	"Beyond the Bush"	January 1, 2020
The Wolfpack gathers and gets candid about untold secrets and burning questions that fans have wondered for years. From epic adventure to major struggles, they expose their world like never before.
12	"Back to the Future"	October 18, 2020
Months before the fire, the Browns film their daily life locked down on the mountain. And watching and reacting to memorable moments from the show for the first time, the Wolfpack reflects on their adventures in Alaska.
12	"The Legacy of Billy Brown"	February 28, 2021
The Wolfpack celebrates the remarkable life of their patriarch Billy Brown. Through never-before seen footage and interviews, Billy speaks to the bush legacy he was driven to establish, fueled by faith and his love of family.
13	"Chaos and Catastrophe"	September 12, 2021
The Browns reflect on a chaotic year on North Star Ranch.
13	"The Way of the Wolfpack"	November 28, 2021
In the wilds of Alaska, Billy and Ami taught their seven children how to think outside the box to survive. As the family finds themselves at a crossroads after the passing of their patriarch, they celebrate the ways they use those lessons everyday.
13	"North Pole to North Star"	December 19, 2021
The Wolfpack vows to make Christmas happier than ever for the newest generation, crafting unique homemade gifts for each other in a one-of-a-kind Secret Santa exchange. And the siblings surprise Mother Ami with a meaningful addition to the ranch.
14	"Above Us Only Blue"	November 29, 2022
14	"World Beyond the Wild"	December 5, 2022
14	"Heart and Soul of the Pack"	December 6, 2022

== Family members ==
Brown family tree

Brenda Britt	Billy	Ami
Twila Byars	Matt	Bam Bam	Raiven	Bear	Raquell	Gabe	Rhain	Noah	Bird	Rain
River	Cove	Sophie	Winifred	Eli	Adam

Name	Relationship	Full name	Birth	Death
William (Billy) Brown	Father	Billy Bryan Brown	December 3, 1952	February 7, 2021
Ami Brown	Mother	Amora Larene Branson Brown	August 28, 1963	
Matt Brown	Son	Matthew Jeremiah Brown	September 7, 1982	May 27, 2026
Bam Bam Brown	Son	Joshua Bam Bam Brown	September 18, 1984	
Bear Brown	Son	Solomon Isaiah Freedom Brown	June 10, 1987	
Gabe Brown	Son	Gabriel Starbuck Brown	December 15, 1989	
Noah Brown	Son	Noah Darkcloud Brown	July 18, 1992	
Bird(y) Brown	Daughter	Amora Jean Snowbird Brown	November 18, 1994	
Rain(y) Brown	Daughter	Merry Christmas Kathryn Raindrop Brown	November 23, 2002	
Twila Byars	Daughter (by Billy's first wife Brenda)	Twila Wilson	1971	
Rhain Alisha Brown	ex-Daughter-in-law (Noah's ex-wife)	Rhain Alisha		
Eli Brown	Grandson (by Noah and wife, Rhain Alisha)	Elijah Connor Brown	February 26, 2019	
Adam Brown	Grandson (by Noah and wife, Rhain Alisha)	Adam Bishop Brown	October, 2021	
Raquell Brown	Daughter-in-law (Gabe's wife)	Raquell Rose Pantilla		
Sophie Brown	Granddaughter (by Gabe and wife, Raquell)			
Winifred Brown	Granddaughter (by Gabe and wife, Raquel)			
Raiven Brown	ex-Daughter-in-law (Bear's ex-wife)	Raiven Adams		
River Brown	Grandson (by Bear and wife, Raiven)	River Anthony Brown	March 9, 2020	
Cove Brown	Grandson (by Bear and wife, Raiven)		January, 2023	

Billy has a criminal history of horse theft in 1980. Ami has a criminal history of welfare fraud.

Billy was previously married to Brenda Britt. Their daughter, Twila Byars, appeared in the episode "Growing the Wolfpack" (S05E04). It has been suggested that the couple had a second child, Brandy.

== Residency issues ==
On October 3, 2014, following an investigation by the Alaska Department of Revenue, a Juneau grand jury indicted the Browns with 60 counts of first-degree unsworn falsification regarding Permanent Fund Dividend forms for their residency and first- and second-degree theft that took place between 2009 and 2012.

Billy was charged with 24 of those counts, which occurred from 2010 to 2013 as well as for the theft of more than $13,000 in dividend money for himself and others. The charges meant that the state believed the family spent more than 180 days a year living outside of Alaska and lied about it on their applications.

On November 18, 2015, Billy and Joshua struck a plea deal for the whole family except Matt and Rain (Matt wasn't living there and didn't file and Rain was too young). They pled guilty for the rest of the family for lying on PFD forms. Billy and Joshua's punishment for stealing over $21,000 was restitution, fines and 30 days of house arrest at a Juneau hotel.
