= John Carmichael Haynes =

John Carmichael Haynes (July 6, 1831 – July 6, 1888) was an Irish-born rancher, judge and public servant in British Columbia.

He was born in Landscape, County Cork, the son of Jonas Haynes and Hester Carmichael, and came to Victoria, British Columbia by way of Panama in 1858. Haynes and Thomas Elwyn were named special constables by James Douglas to restore order at Hills Bar following disturbances by gold miners there. Haynes next served as a constable at Yale. In 1860, he was asked to assist William George Cox at Rock Creek near the border with the United States. Later that year, Cox sent Haynes to Similkameen, where he established a customs house. In 1861, he was sent to Osoyoos Lake and he became deputy collector of customs in March of the following year. In 1864, he went to the Kootenay District as a justice of the peace and assistant gold commissioner. He was named to the Legislative Council in 1864. Haynes served briefly as district court judge at French Creek in 1866. In 1870, he was sent to Wild Horse Creek as magistrate and district court judge. Despite his complaints about the insufficient salary and inconvenience of the move, he served there until 1872. He then returned to Osoyoos as justice of the peace and was also employed in the federal customs department.

Haynes acquired 20,000 acres (8,094 ha) of land near Osoyoos Lake. He originally established a horse ranch but soon turned to cattle ranching, owning a herd of 4,200 cattle.

Haynes was married three times: first to Julia, a native woman from Colville, Washington, then to Charlotte Moresby in 1868 and finally to Josephine Pittendrigh in 1875. Haynes died in Princeton at the age of 57.

Haynes Point Provincial Park and Haynes Creek were named in his honour.
