= La Stella Winery =

Coordinates: 49.0545°N 119.4998662°W

LaStella
- Location: Oliver, British Columbia, Canada
- Appellation: Okanagan Valley
- Founded: 2005
- First vintage: 2006
- Key people: Sean Salem (co-founder), Saeedeh Salem (co-founder)
- Parent company: Enotecca Wineries and Resorts
- Varietals: Merlot, Cabernet Sauvignon, Moscato, Cabernet Franc, Pinot grigio, Chardonnay, Sangiovese Grosso
- Website: https://lastella.ca//

LaStella is a Canadian wine grower and producer. It is located on the east bench of Osoyoos Lake, British Columbia, only a few minutes from USA-Canada border. Southern Okanagan Valley is known for its many wineries because of its unique desert micro climate. In fact the Sonoran desert that starts in Mexico, ends some 20 kilometers after entering Canadian border.

It is the sister winery to Le Vieux Pin. Both wineries are owned and operated by Enotecca Wineries and Resorts, a holding company owned by entrepreneurs Sean and Saeedeh Salem.

== History ==
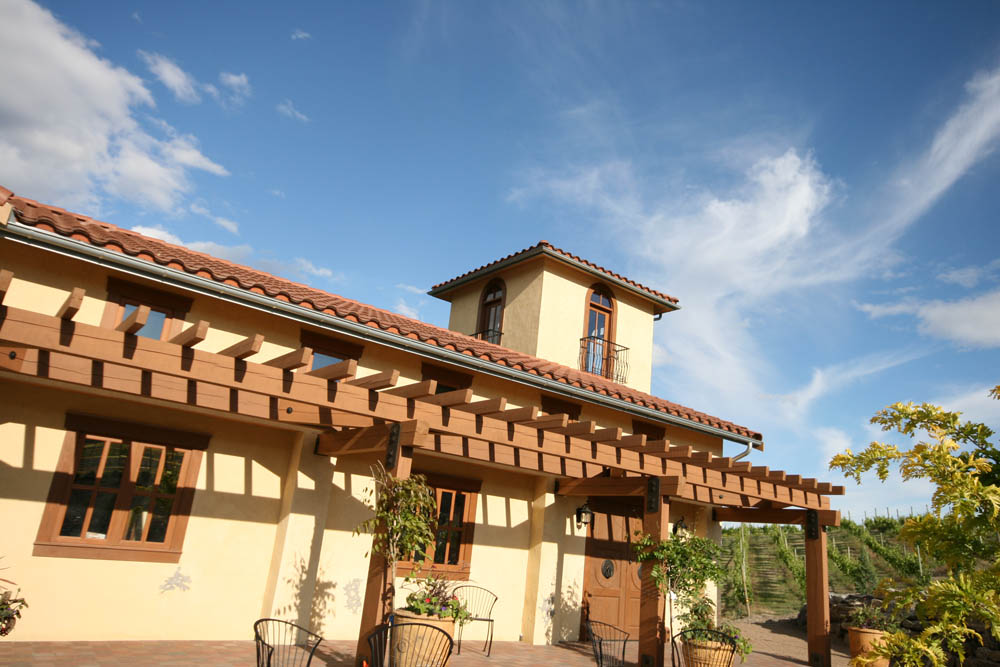
The LaStella estate

LaStella opened its doors to visitors in 2007 by Sean Salem, his wife and partner, Saeedeh Salem. It was named for the starry nights of Osoyoos and inspired by the traditions of winemaking in Italy.

Its first vintage was in 2006. The winery practices organic farming.

The estate is co-managed by Severine Pinte (winemaker/viticulturist), Jody Subotin (vineyard manager) and Rasoul Salehi (director of sales and marketing). The current winemaker, Severine Pinte, joined LaStella in 2010 after relocating from France. She also serves as the winery’s Viticulturalist.

In 2010, almost four acres of the La Feuille d’Or, one of the estate's vineyards, was wiped out by a mudslide.

Foad Rafii is the designer and architect behind LaStella’s Tuscany-inspired villa. He completed the project in 2007.

== Wines ==
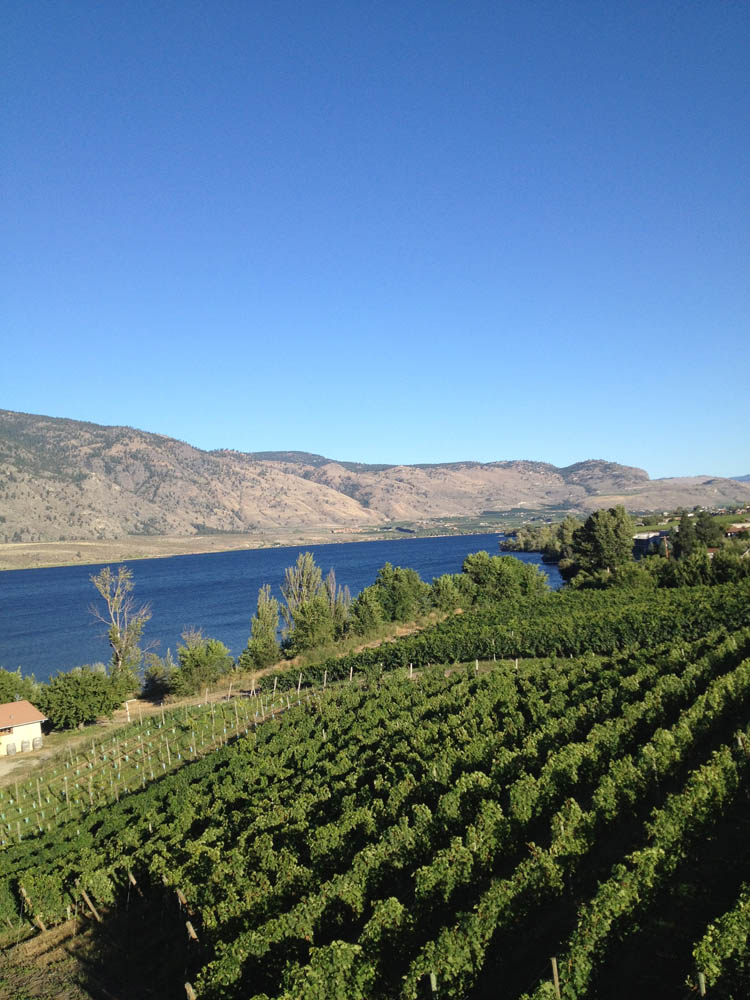
One of LaStella's vineyards

The estate features five vineyards: Le Feuille D’or, Mercier, Stagg’s, Selona, and Lumeno. In total, the LaStella has 60 acres of land, shared with its sister winery, Le Vieux Pin.

The red wines that LaStella produces are primarily made from Merlot, Cabernet Sauvignon, Saniovese Grosso, and Cabernet Franc.

White wines are primarily made from Moscato, Pinot Grigio, and Chardonnay.
