= Sw̓iw̓s Park =

Canadian provincial park

sw̓iw̓s Park
- IUCN category II (national park)
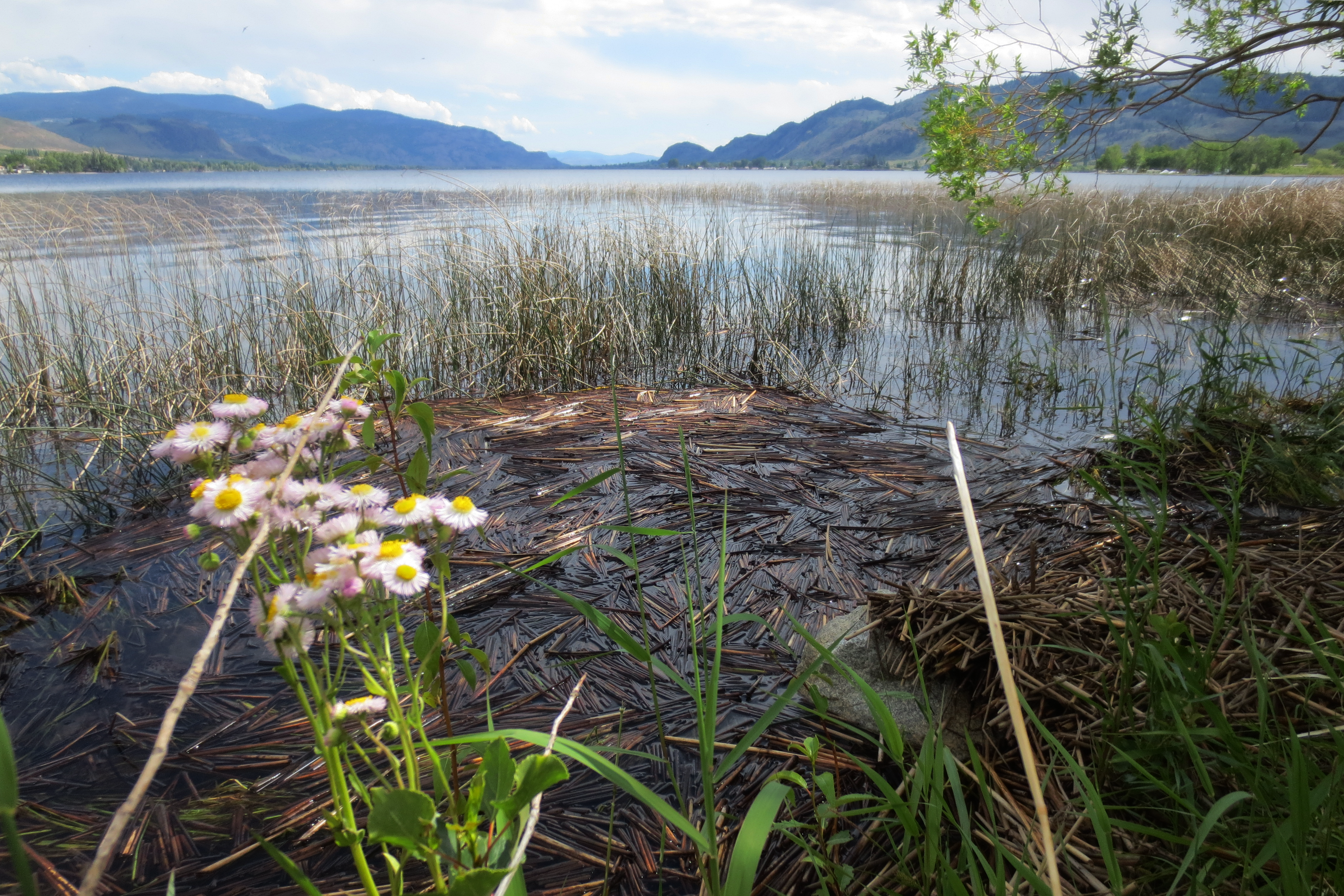
- Looking south toward Washington State from sw̓iw̓s Park

- Location within British Columbia
- Interactive map of sw̓iw̓s Park
- Location: Osoyoos, British Columbia, Canada
- Coordinates: 49°01′01″N 119°27′00″W
- Area: 38 ha (94 acres)
- Established: 1939
- Governing body: BC Parks

sw̓iw̓s Park (formerly, Osoyoos Park, 1939–62; Haynes Point Provincial Park, 1962–2015; sẁiẁs Provincial Park, 2015–16) is a narrow spit jutting eastward into Osoyoos Lake. A provincial park in British Columbia, Canada, it is on the western shore of Osoyoos Lake southwest of the town of Osoyoos.

The park is located near the Canada–US border at the southern-most end of the Okanagan region of British Columbia. About 38 hectares (94 acres) in size, the park was originally created in 1939 and named Haynes Point Provincial Park. In 2015, the name was changed by a provincial act from Haynes Point to sw̓iw̓s, the original Okanagan (Nsyilx'tsn) name for a crossing point in the lake, meaning "narrowing of the waters".

== Park history ==
Haynes Point and adjacent Haynes Creek were named for John Carmichael Haynes (1831–1888). Haynes was "an Irishman who came to BC in 1858 and was a police officer, customs officer, magistrate, assistant gold commissioner, government agent, and county court judge in Similkameen, Osoyoos and Kootenay Districts for many years; he was a member of the legislative council [of the Colony of British Columbia], 1864–66, a rancher in Osoyoos, 1866–88, accumulating 22,000 acres. Generally known as Judge Haynes." The Hudson's Bay Fur Brigade Trail passed through the area in the 1800s.

The original name of the park – Osoyoos Park – was established by Order in Council on 25 January 1939. The name was changed to Haynes Point Park on 17 May 1962, with its area increased to 38 ha (94 acres) on 12 May 1988. The local council converted the park to provincial designation by Bill 17-2000 of the Protected Areas of British Columbia Act on 29 June 2000.

== Ancestral name ==
In the ancestral Okanagan language [Nsyilxcən; Salishan] of the Okanagan Indian Band, sẁiẁs refers to a location of the lake where it was narrow and shallow enough to cross by foot or on a horse. In pronunciation, sẁiẁs preceded by the letter, "O", is the origin and pronunciation of the town name, Osoyoos.

On 25 March 2015, the name was changed from Haynes Point to sw̓iw̓s Provincial Park by Bill 8-2015 of the Protected Areas of British Columbia Amendment Act, then simplified further to sẁiẁs Park by Bill 15-2016 of the Protected Areas of British Columbia Amendment Act on 19 May 2016.

== Heritage and culture ==
sw̓iw̓s Park is an archaeological and cultural heritage site located within the traditional territory of the Osoyoos Indian Band. The Osoyoos Indian Band and BC Parks work in partnership to ensure the long-term protection of the archaeological and cultural heritage resources within the park.

=== Archaeology ===
In 2014, ancestral remains dated to approximately 1,224 years ago were unearthed and then reburied in the park, making the remains the oldest on record in the Osoyoos region. Radiocarbon dating of animal materials recovered from an ancient midden provided insights about the diet of Osoyoos Indian Band ancestors who lived in the area 3,265 – 4,475 years ago. Obsidian flakes retrieved from the park were determined to be from Oregon, affirming that travel and trade routes of indigenous people occurred extensively along the Columbia River Basin thousands of years ago before the arrival of European settlers in the area in the 19th century.

== Management and facilities ==
Open each year from April to October, the park is managed by the Osoyoos Indian Band. Recognized as one of British Columbia's most popular parks for its lakeside scenery, indigenous heritage, and proximity to Osoyoos, sẁiẁs Park provides 41 individual campsites on gravel pads for trailers and tents along the lakeshore, with privacy created between pads by natural foliage and landscaping. Throughout the park are a paved road for vehicles, cycling and hiking trails, campfire pits, one boat launch, picnic tables, tap drinking water, public toilets, and a wetland area with self-guided paths and interpretative information stands.

== Fauna and flora ==
The park is a habitat for diverse wildlife, including white-tailed deer, mule deer, American black bear, ospreys, bald eagles, and various other species. Due to the favorable climate, natural migration flyway of the Okanagan basin, and nesting habitats, the park is commonly used for riparian birdwatching and research. The park species of concern include the tiger salamander, various rare bats, barn owl, American spadefoot toad and painted turtle. Bullfrogs and Canada geese are considered invasive species in the park.

The park protects ecosystems at risk and endangered species, such as peach leaf willow, antelope brush, desert grasses, and wetlands.

== Gallery ==
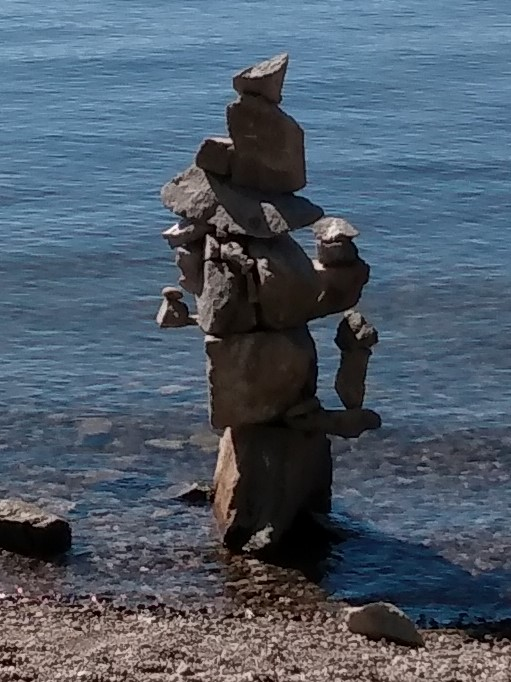
Inuksuk on shore of sw̓iw̓s Park, Osoyoos Lake, July 2020

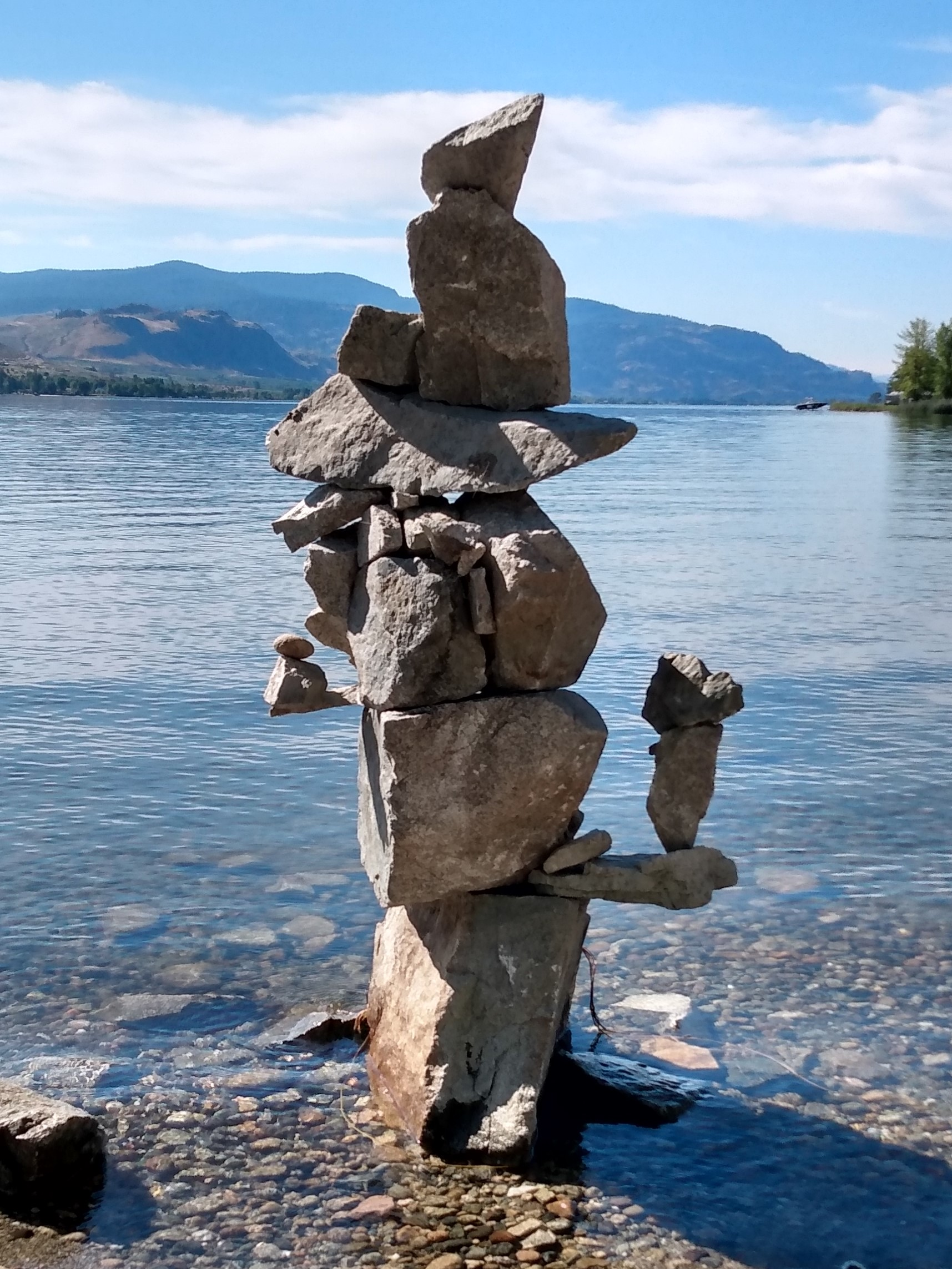
Inuksuk on shore of sw̓iw̓s Park, looking south over Osoyoos Lake toward Washington state in the distance, July 2020
