= Pierre Lake (Washington) =

- Location within Washington (state)
- Location: Stevens County, Washington
- Coordinates: 48°54′02″N 118°08′19″W
- Type: lake
- Basin countries: United States
- Surface elevation: 1,680 ft (512 m)

Pierre Lake is a lake in the U.S. state of Washington.

Pierre Lake was named after Peter Pierre, a pioneer settler.

== See also ==
- List of lakes in Washington
