= Berdeen Lake =

- Location within Washington (state) Location within the United States
- Location: North Cascades National Park, Whatcom County, Washington, United States
- Coordinates: 48°42′40″N 121°28′04″W
- Lake type: Cirque Lake
- Basin countries: United States
- Max. length: 1 mi (1.6 km)
- Max. width: .25 mi (0.40 km)
- Surface elevation: 5,016 ft (1,529 m)

Berdeen Lake is located in North Cascades National Park, in the U. S. state of Washington. Berdeen Lake is 1.25 mi (2.01 km) east of Hagan Mountain and the outlet from the lake leads to a series of waterfalls known as Berdeen Falls which drop 850 ft (260 m) on a tributary of Bacon Creek.
