= Le Vieux Pin =

Coordinates: 49.1591436°N 119.5399804°W

- Location: Oliver, British Columbia, Canada
- Appellation: Okanagan Valley
- Founded: 2006
- First vintage: 2005
- Key people: Sean Salem (co-founder), Saeedeh Salem (co-founder)
- Parent company: Enotecca Wineries and Resorts
- Varietals: Syrah, Viognier, Roussanne, Marsanne, Pinot Noir Rosé
- Website: http://levieuxpin.ca//

Le Vieux Pin is a Canadian wine grower and producer. It is located in Oliver, British Columbia on Black Sage Bench, a road that runs along Oliver in the southern Okanagan Valley and known for its many wineries.

It is the sister winery to La Stella Winery. Both wineries are operated by Enotecca Wineries and Resorts, a holding company owned by entrepreneurs Sean and Saeedeh Salem.

== History ==
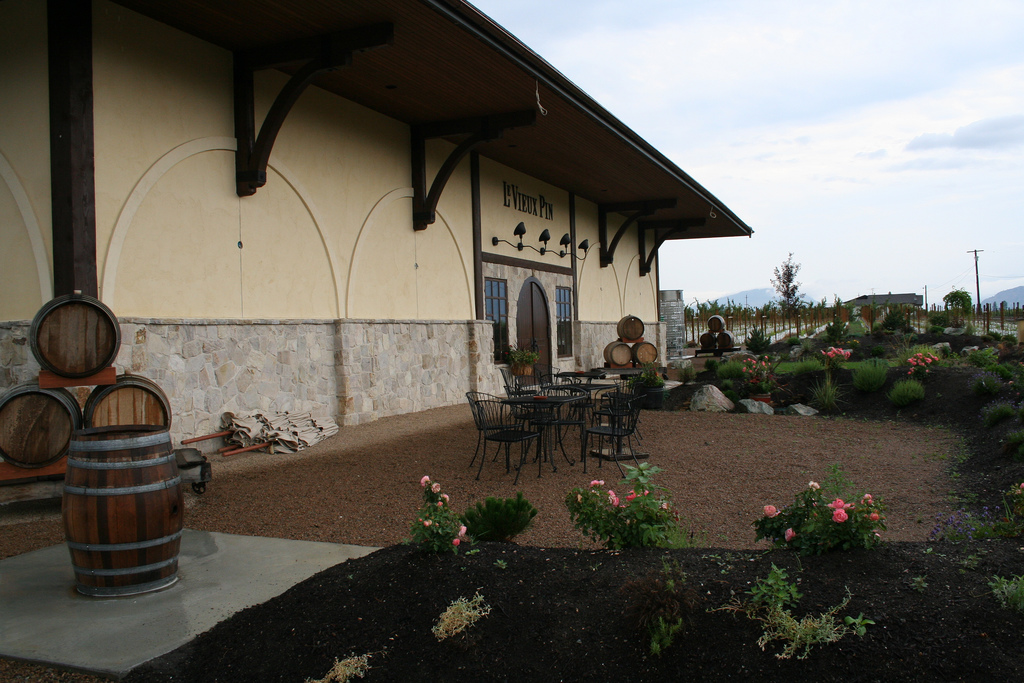
Le Vieux Pin

Le Vieux Pin opened its tasting room doors in 2006 by Sean Salem, his wife and partner, Saeedeh Salem.

Its first vintage was in 2005 and included Vaila Pinot Noir Rose, Auroré Sauvignon Blanc, Belle Pinot Noir, Apogée Merlot, and Époque Merlot. The winery practices organic farming.

The estate is co-managed by director of sales and marketing Rasoul Salehi and winemaker/viticulturist Severine Pinte.

The current winemaker, Severine Pinte, joined Le Vieux Pin in 2010 after relocating from France. She also serves as the winery’s Viticulturalist.

In 2010, almost four acres of the La Feuille d’Or, one of the estate's vineyards, was wiped out by a mudslide.

Le Vieux Pin was named after the pine tree on the northwest corner of the vineyard.

== Wines ==
The estate features six vineyards: Le Grand Pin, Deadman Lake Vineyard, Le Feuille D’or, Stagg’s, U2, and Crowley, though Le Vieux Pin does not own Deadman Lake Vineyard. In total, the Le Vieux Pin has 50 acres of land, shared with its sister winery, LaStella.

The red wines that Le Vieux Pin produces are primarily made from Syrah.

White wines are primarily made from Viognier, Roussanne, and Marsanne.

As of January 2016, Le Vieux Pin Syrah Cuvee Classique (vintage 2009 and 2010) and Le Vieux Pin Syrah Cuvee Violette (vintage 2013) are listed on four international Michelin starred restaurants: The Table Kevin Fehling (Germany), Hakkasan (London), Yauatcha (London), and Beach Blanket Babylon (London).
