= Dagger Lake =

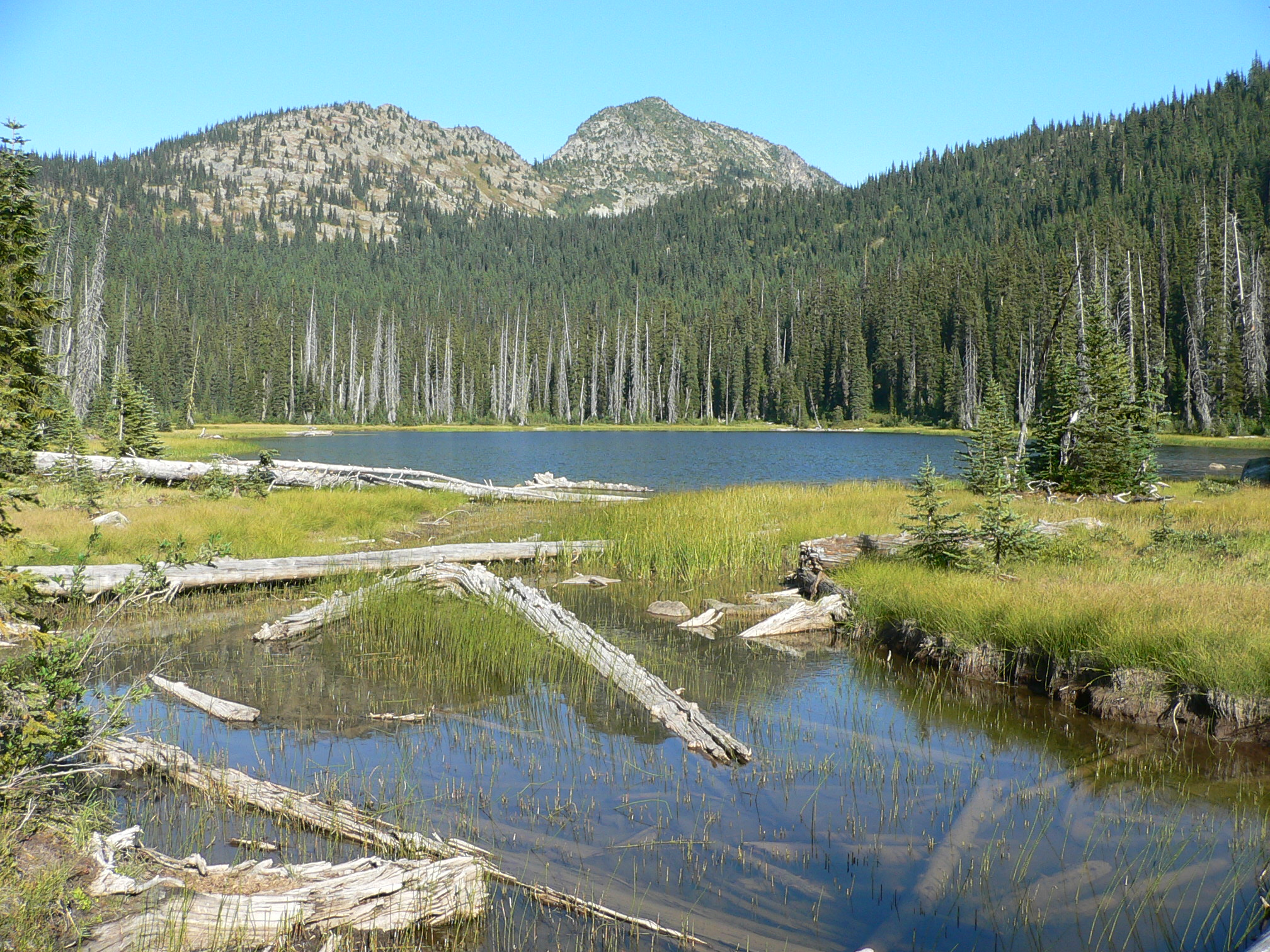
- Dagger Lake

- Location within Washington (state) Location within the United States
- Location: North Cascades National Park, Chelan County, Washington, United States
- Coordinates: 48°28′05″N 120°39′18″W
- Lake type: Glacial Lake
- Primary outflows: East Fork Bridge Creek
- Basin countries: United States
- Max. length: 300 yd (270 m)
- Max. width: 150 yd (140 m)
- Surface elevation: 5,512 ft (1,680 m)

Dagger Lake is located in North Cascades National Park, in the U. S. state of Washington. Dagger Lake is accessible via the Twisp Pass Trail and the lake is 7.6 mi (12.2 km) from the North Cascades Highway or 4.7 mi (7.6 km) from the Twisp River Road trailhead in Wenatchee National Forest.

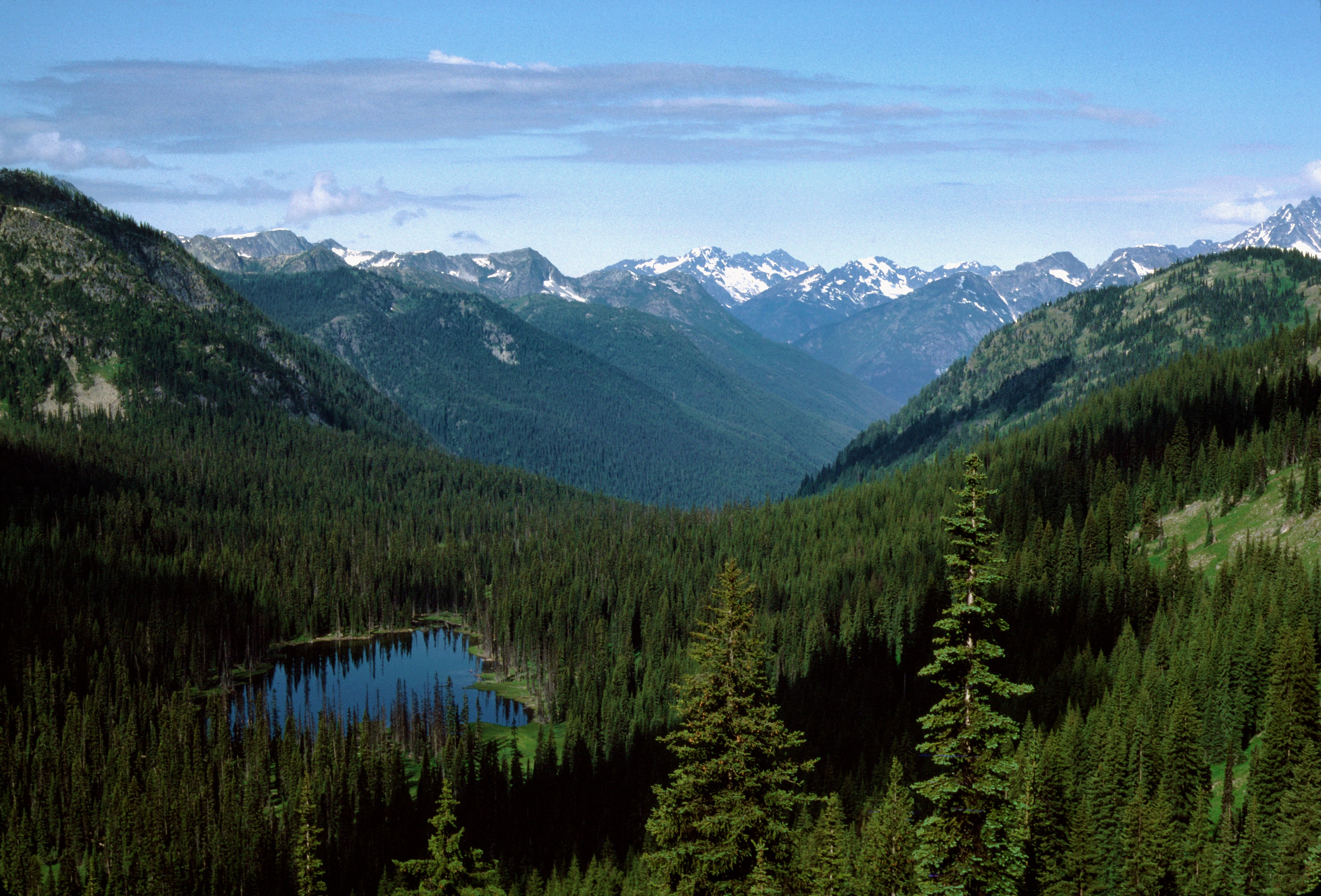
Dagger Lake from Twisp Pass
