= Bead Lake =

Lake in Washington

- Interactive map of Bead Lake
- Location: Pend Oreille County, Washington
- Coordinates: 48°17′53″N 117°06′56″W
- Type: Lake
- Surface area: 718 acres (2.9 km^{2})
- Surface elevation: 2833 ft (863.5 m)

Bead Lake is a lake in Colville National Forest, 8 miles north of Newport, Washington. The US forest service operates a boat launch on the southern end of the lake, and there is a residential area on the western side of the lake.
