= Zosel Dam =

- Location: Oroville, Washington
- Coordinates: 48°56′00″N 119°25′10″W
- Construction began: 1986
- Opening date: 1987
- Operator: Washington Department of Ecology

Dam and spillways
- Impounds: Okanogan River

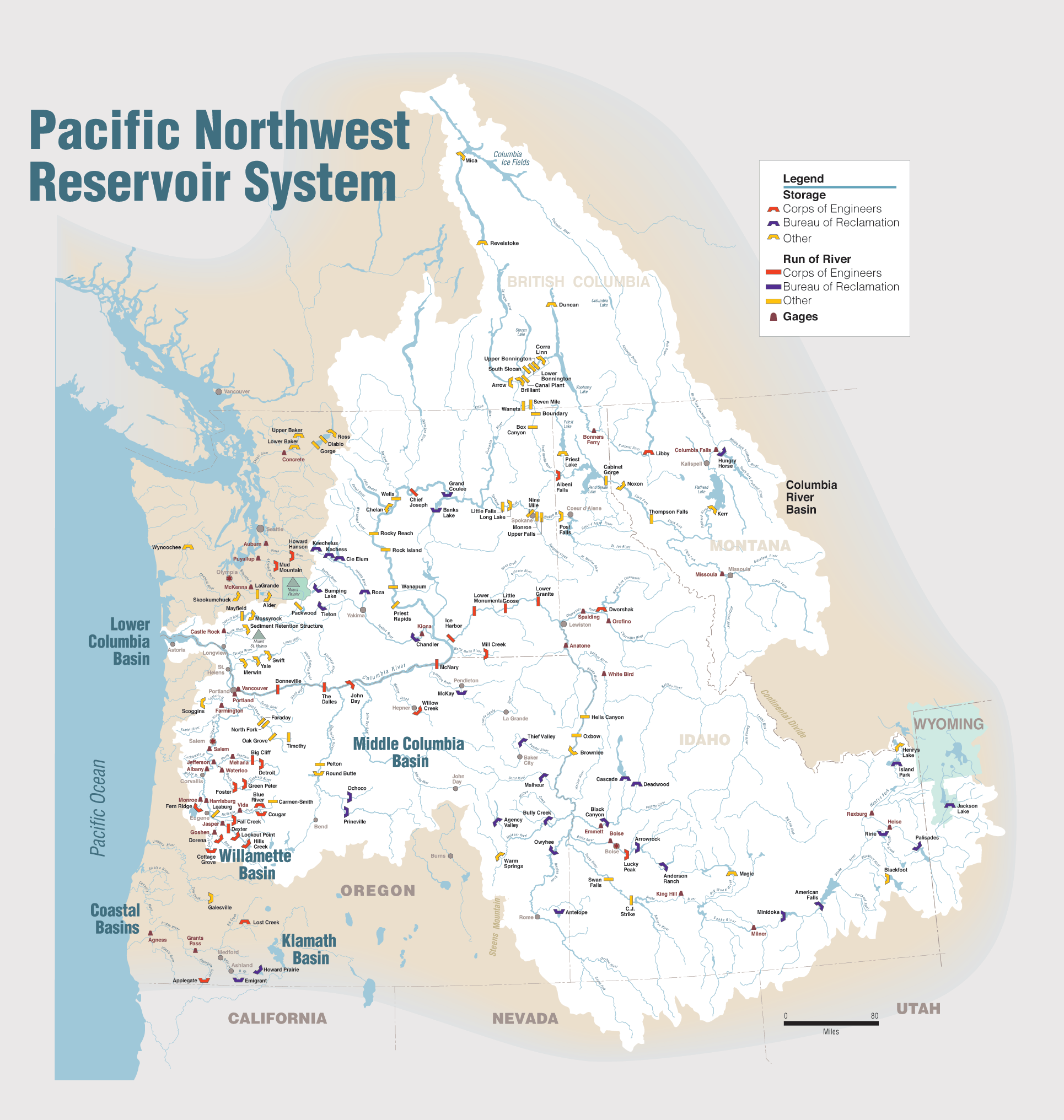
Pacific Northwest River System

Zosel Dam is a dam in the U.S. state of Washington that blocks the Okanogan River 2.7 km (1.7 mi) south of Osoyoos Lake to control upstream water levels. The dam was built as part of the larger Osoyoos Lake International Water Control Structure, a joint venture of the Washington State Department of Ecology and the British Columbia Ministry of the Environment. The dam was designed by the Canadian firm Acres International Limited and built by the American firm Rognlins Inc.

Zosel Dam is named for the Zosel Lumber Company which constructed the original dam on the site.

Because it impounds a river that crosses the Canada–United States border, Zosel Dam is subject to international water-sharing agreements governed by the International Joint Commission.

== History ==
The first dam on Lake Osoyoos was built in 1927 by the Zosel Lumber Company using rock-filled timber crib and pilings. The structure impounded a mill pond where logs were stored before being processed at the Zosel sawmill. The sawmill stopped operating in the 1960s.

In 1946, the International Joint Commission established the International Osoyoos Lake Board of Control to govern the operations of Zosel Dam. This decision was prompted by repeated flooding of the lakeshore.

As the 1927 structure aged it suffered failures in 1974 and 1975. This led the International Joint Commission to request a report from the U.S. Army Corps of Engineers in 1978. The requested report "expresse[d] grave concern about the dam's structural integrity", so the Joint Commission asked the Army Corps to plan a replacement structure. The plan was delivered in 1979 and called for a new dam to be constructed about 1 km (0.62 mi) upstream.

Construction of the new dam did not begin for several years. An agreement on cost sharing between Washington and British Columbia was not reached until 1985, delayed by "fiscal problems" on both sides of the border. Once the agreement was reached, an engineering firm was hired and a final site was selected, closer to the original dam location, 200 m (660 ft). Construction began in 1986 and was completed by 1987, with the completed structure officially commissioned in 1988.
