= Doubtful Lake =

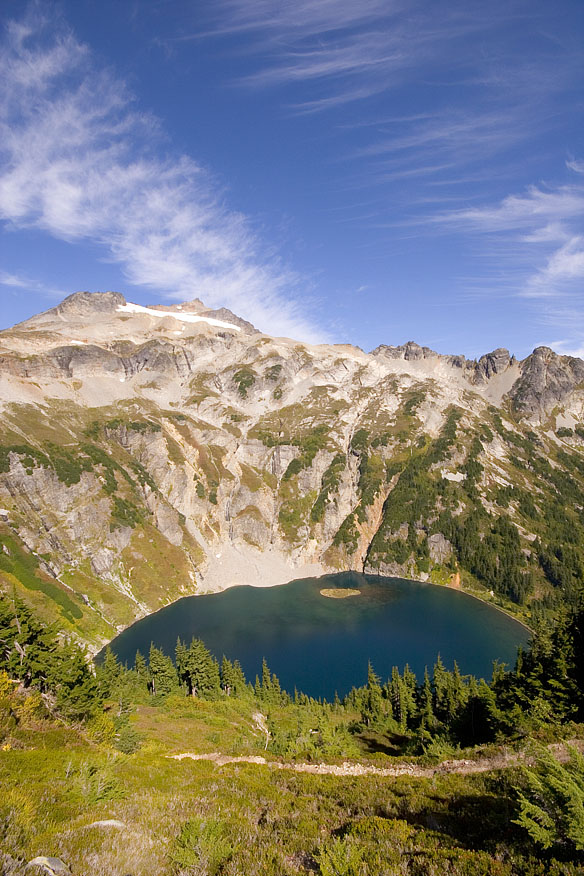
- Doubtful Lake from Sahale Arm, with Sahale Peak in the background

- Location within Washington (state) Location within the United States
- Location: North Cascades National Park, Chelan County, Washington, United States
- Coordinates: 48°28′27″N 121°02′52″W
- Lake type: Alpine lake
- Primary outflows: Doubtful Creek
- Basin countries: United States
- Max. length: 450 yd (410 m)
- Max. width: 400 yd (370 m)
- Surface elevation: 5,390 ft (1,640 m)

Doubtful Lake is located in North Cascades National Park, in the U. S. state of Washington. Doubtful Lake can be accessed on foot by way of Cascade Pass and following the Sahale Arm Trail to another side trail which leads to the lake. A designated backcountry camping zone is located at the lake.

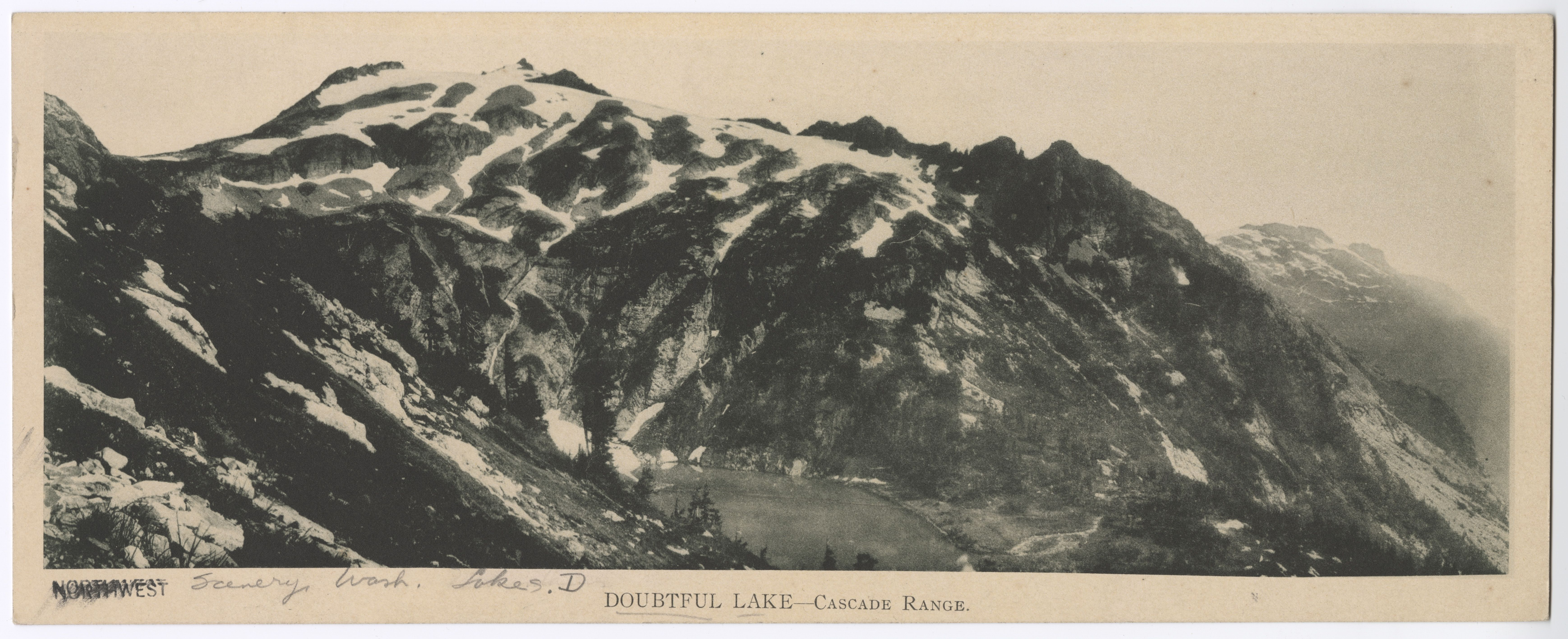
Doubtful Lake - Cascade Range, 1907.
