= Mason Lake =

Lake in Mason County, Washington, United States

- Location within Washington (state) Location within the United States
- Location: Mason County, Washington
- Coordinates: 47°20′00″N 122°57′33″W
- Primary inflows: Schumacher Creek
- Primary outflows: Sherwood Creek
- Basin countries: United States
- Max. length: 5 mi (8.0 km)
- Max. width: 0.75 mi (1.21 km)
- Surface area: 1,000 acres (400 ha)
- Average depth: 48 ft (15 m)
- Max. depth: 90 ft (27 m)
- Shore length^{1}: 10.9 mi (17.5 km)
- Surface elevation: 194 ft (59 m)
- Islands: None
- ^{1} Shore length is not a well-defined measure.

Mason Lake is a natural elongated lake south of Belfair, Washington, United States in Mason County. Named for Charles H. Mason, the first secretary of Washington Territory, the lake is on the isthmus of the Kitsap Peninsula between the Hood Canal and Pickering Passage of the Case Inlet. The smaller Benson Lake is to its eastern side.

Mason Lake is approximately 1000 acres in size and four miles long. Its maximum depth is 90 feet and the mean depth is 48 feet. With 10.9 miles of shoreline, the lake sits at 194 feet above sea level.

More than a thousand residents live yearlong around the shores of Mason Lake, the second largest freshwater lake in Mason County, second to the man-made Lake Cushman to its northwest.

Originally a summer vacation community, the lake has always been known for its power boats, jet skis and water skiing. A county park provides picnic and boat launching access. Swimming is limited to private access parks and residences. The single lane boat launch is on the steeper side and winches tend to get jammed if they're in the locked or retrieval state.

Mason Lake is also home to a large amount of wildlife, including bald eagles, ring-necked pheasants, robins, mallards, diving ducks, canvasbacks, ruddy ducks, otters, divers, killdeer, and great blue herons. Fish include rainbow trout, largemouth bass, smallmouth bass, yellow perch, brown bullhead catfish, rock bass, kokanee salmon, and northern pikeminnow.

The community of Mason Lake is located centrally between Grapeview and Harstine Island to the east, and Twanoh State Park to the west. Much of the area surrounding Mason Lake is commercial timberland in various states of harvest.
