= Green View Lake =

- Location within Washington (state) Location within the United States
- Location: North Cascades National Park, Chelan County, Washington, United States
- Coordinates: 48°28′06″N 120°53′37″W
- Lake type: Glacial lake
- Primary outflows: Deadman Creek
- Basin countries: United States
- Max. length: 0.50 mi (0.80 km)
- Max. width: 0.20 mi (0.32 km)
- Surface elevation: 5,459 ft (1,664 m)

Green View Lake is located in North Cascades National Park, in the U. S. state of Washington. Green View Lake is 1 mi (1.6 km) southeast of Goode Mountain and is within a cirque. The lake is not accessible via any designated trails but is only about 2 mi (3.2 km) northwest of the Pacific Crest Trail and the backcountry camping zone at North Fork.
