= Berdeen Falls =

Waterfall in Washington (state), United States

Coordinates: 48°42′22″N 121°28′57″W

- Interactive map of Berdeen Falls
- Location: Whatcom County, Washington, United States
- Type: Tiered
- Total height: 850 feet (260 m)
- Number of drops: 3
- Longest drop: 400 feet (120 m)
- Total width: 40 feet (12 m)
- Watercourse: Bacon Creek
- Average flow rate: 200 cubic feet per second (5.7 m^{3}/s)

Berdeen Falls is a series of three waterfalls located in Whatcom County, Washington. The 850-foot (260 m) falls are on a stretch of Bacon Creek (a tributary of the Skagit River) downstream of Berdeen Lake.The drops include a 400-foot (120 m) horsetail, a 200-foot (61 m) bedrock slide, and a 250-foot (76 m) plunge waterfall.

== See also ==
- List of waterfalls
