= Bacon Creek =

Glacial stream in Whatcom County, Washington, U.S.

Coordinates: 48°42′22″N 121°28′57″W

Bacon Creek is a glacial stream in Whatcom County, Washington. It originates in a glacier on the southwest face of Bacon Peak, flows into a small tarn, then flows over the Berdeen Falls. At the base of the waterfall, the creek turns southeast and joins the Skagit River near and discharges into the Skagit River near Marblemount.

Bacon Creek was named for prospector Albert Bacon, who arrived in the area around 1879.
