= Sherwood Creek =

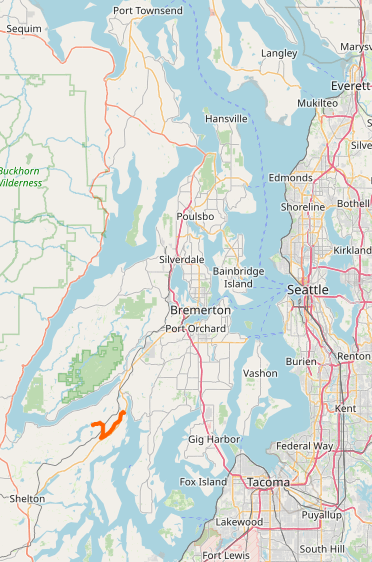
- Sherwood Creek outlined in orange

Location
- Country: United States
- State: Washington
- County: Mason County
- City: Allyn

Physical characteristics
- Source: Mason Lake
  - location: 47°21′14″N 122°55′19″W
- Mouth
  - location: 47°22′35″N 122°49′54″W

Sherwood Creek is a creek in Mason County, Washington fed by Mason Lake. It runs through the small town of Allyn, Washington, before releasing into the Case Inlet at the base of the Kitsap Peninsula. It is a popular local picnic and camping spot.

== Geography ==
- Source: 47°21′14″N 122°55′19″W
- Mouth: 47°22′35″N 122°49′54″W

Sherwood Creek originates from Mason Lake, which in turn is fed by Schumocher Creek. The creek is approximately eight miles long, and drains into a Case Inlet estuary. It has one known tributary, Anderson Lake Creek, and a mill pond.

== History ==
The town of Allyn was settled in 1853 but was not officially founded until 1889. By 1890, Allyn had become a significant lumber exporter, with railways constructed along the creek. A sawmill was established by the creek, operated by Joe Sherwood, who died in an accident at the mill in 1873. Following his death, the creek was named Sherwood Creek in his honor.

In the 1950s, Mill Pond was likely formed by the local Indigenous tribe, presumably for fishing purposes. Currently, the Allyn Salmon Enhancement Group (ASEG) is dedicated to protecting and aiding the salmon population in the creek. They undertake various projects along the creek, from the delta to its source at Mason Lake.

Additionally, there is a Naval railway running alongside the less populated side of the creek's valley, which crosses over the creek near its source. Remnants of an old logging site and possible parts of the former State Route 3 can be found on a small, hidden road near a residence.

== Wildlife ==
The creek is teeming with wildlife. From October through November, salmon swim upstream to reproduce. Crayfish, though rare, inhabit the creek. The surrounding land supports a variety of animals, including deer, coyotes, bears, chipmunks, squirrels, and rabbits, as well as numerous bird species, plants, fungi, rodents, and insects. At night, spiders become active, often descending from trees, while other nocturnal animals, such as coyotes, emerge to hunt. Coyotes can pose a hazard to other animals and occasionally approach homes in search of food, causing concerns for residents. Additionally, many beavers inhabit the creek, and their characteristic chewed sticks are commonly found nearby.
