= Palmer Lake (Washington) =

Lake in Okanogan County, Washington, United States

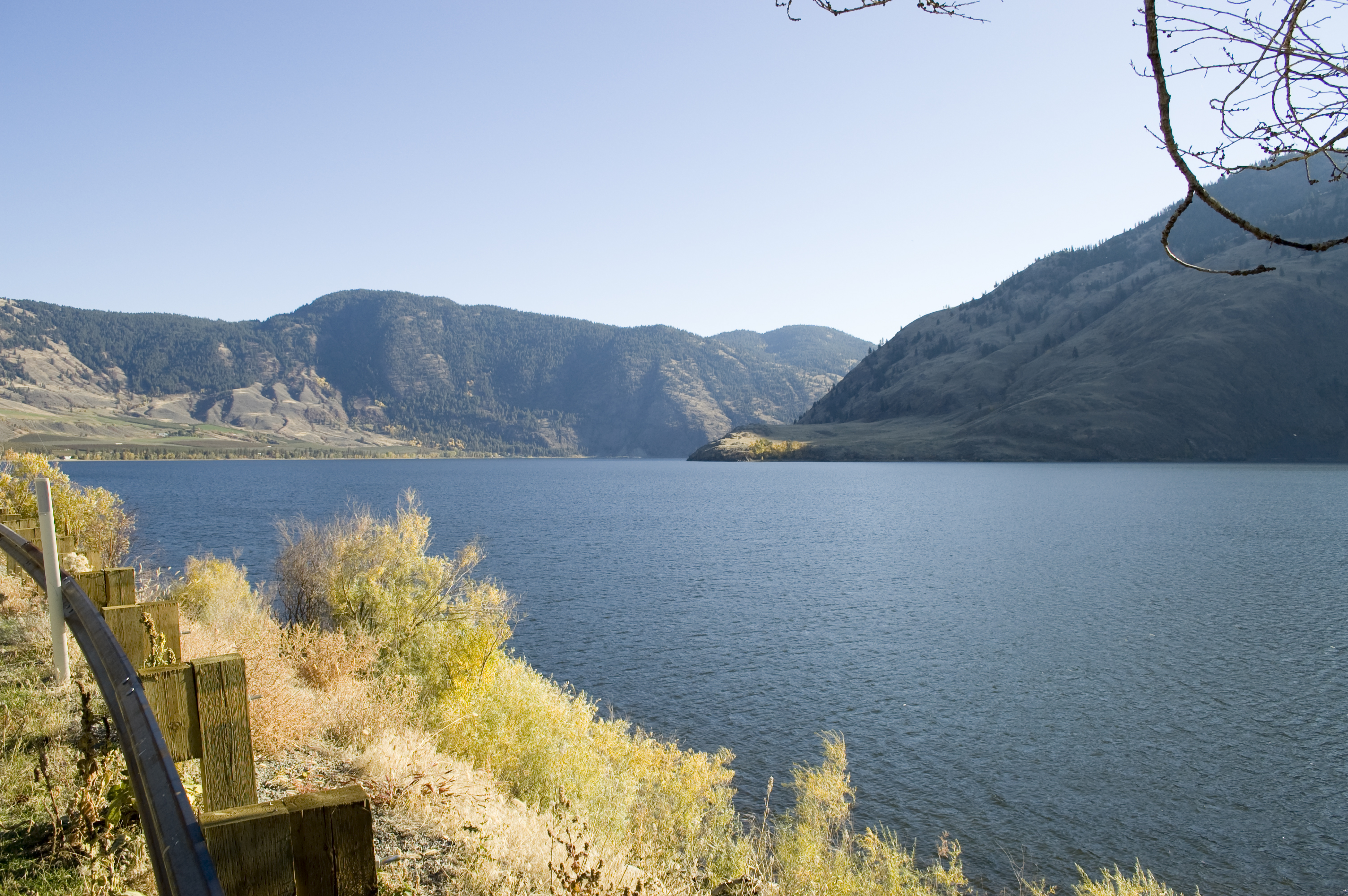
- The shore of the lake

- Location within Washington (state) Location within the United States
- Location: Okanogan County, Washington
- Coordinates: 48°54′00″N 119°37′03″W
- Primary outflows: Palmer Creek
- Basin countries: United States
- Surface area: 2,100 acres (850 ha)
- Average depth: 51 ft (16 m)
- Max. depth: 79 ft (24 m)
- Shore length^{1}: 9.9 miles (15.9 km)
- Surface elevation: 1,152 ft (351 m)
- Settlements: Loomis, Washington
- ^{1} Shore length is not a well-defined measure.

Palmer Lake is a lake in Okanogan County, in the U.S. state of Washington.

Fish that can be found in this lake are the black crappie, burbot, Largemouth bass, Smallmouth bass, Sockeye salmon, and the Yellow perch.

Known as Haipwil to the Indigenous people, Palmer Lake is named for James Palmer, who had a cattle ranch at the north end of the lake around 1875.
