= Osoyoos Lake =

Lake in the United States and Canada

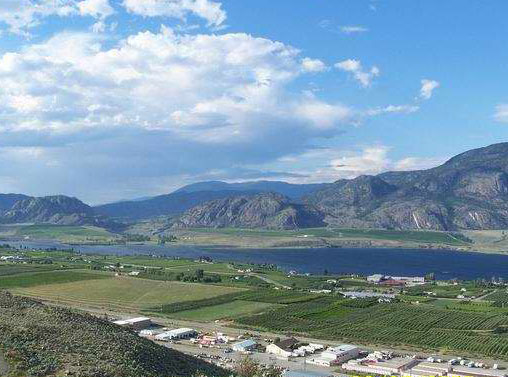

- Location within Washington (state) Location within British Columbia Location within the United States Location within Canada
- Location: Regional District of Okanagan-Similkameen, British Columbia / Okanogan County, Washington
- Coordinates: 49°0′1.16″N 119°26′44.13″W
- Basin countries: Canada, United States
- Surface area: 5,729 acres (2,318 ha)
- Surface elevation: 912.78 ft (278.22 m)
- Settlements: Osoyoos, British Columbia; Oroville, Washington

Osoyoos Lake is a lake located in British Columbia, Canada, and Washington, United States. Osoyoos is derived from the word sẁiẁs meaning "narrowing of the waters" in the local Okanagan language (Syilx'tsn).

Located on the lakeshore are the town of Osoyoos, British Columbia and city of Oroville, Washington. The lake's maximum elevation is 912.78 ft (278.22 m), while its minimum elevation is 909.46 ft (277.20 m). The 62-year average discharge into the Okanogan River at Oroville is 683 cu ft/s (19.3 m^{3}/s). Maximum discharge in 2004 was 1,340 cu ft/s (38 m^{3}/s). Oroville's Osoyoos Lake State Park is located on its shore.

== Hydrology ==
Osoyoos Lake and its outlet and primary inflow, the Okanagan River (spelled in the United States as the Okanogan River), are subject to international water-sharing agreements governed by the International Joint Commission as part of the Columbia Basin. The authority responsible for overseeing the IJC agreements is the International Osoyoos Lake Board of Control, composed of appointees from Environment Canada, the BC Ministry of Water, Land Air Protection, the US Army Corps of Engineers, the US Geological Survey, and private consultants.

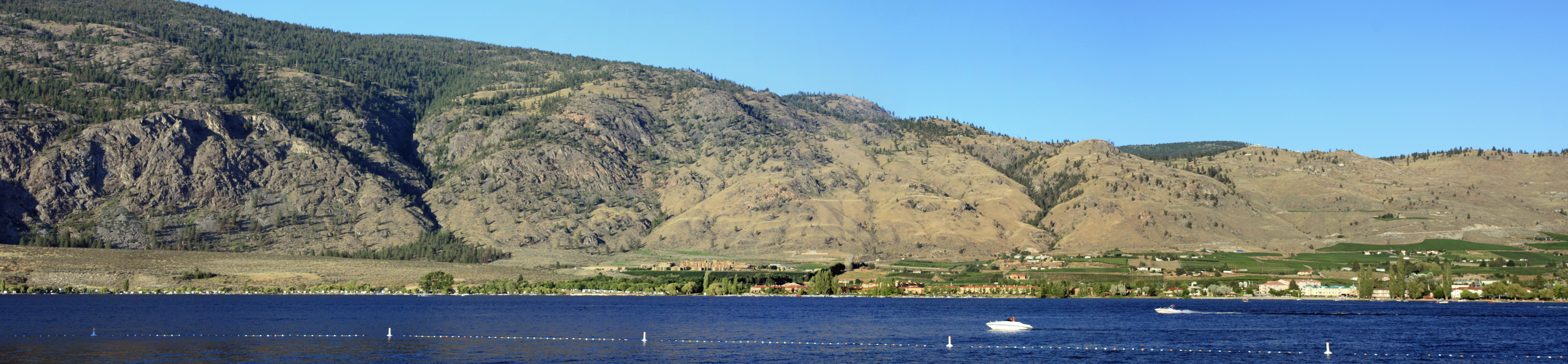
Looking east from town, Osoyoos Lake, South Okanagan Valley, British Columbia

== Gallery ==
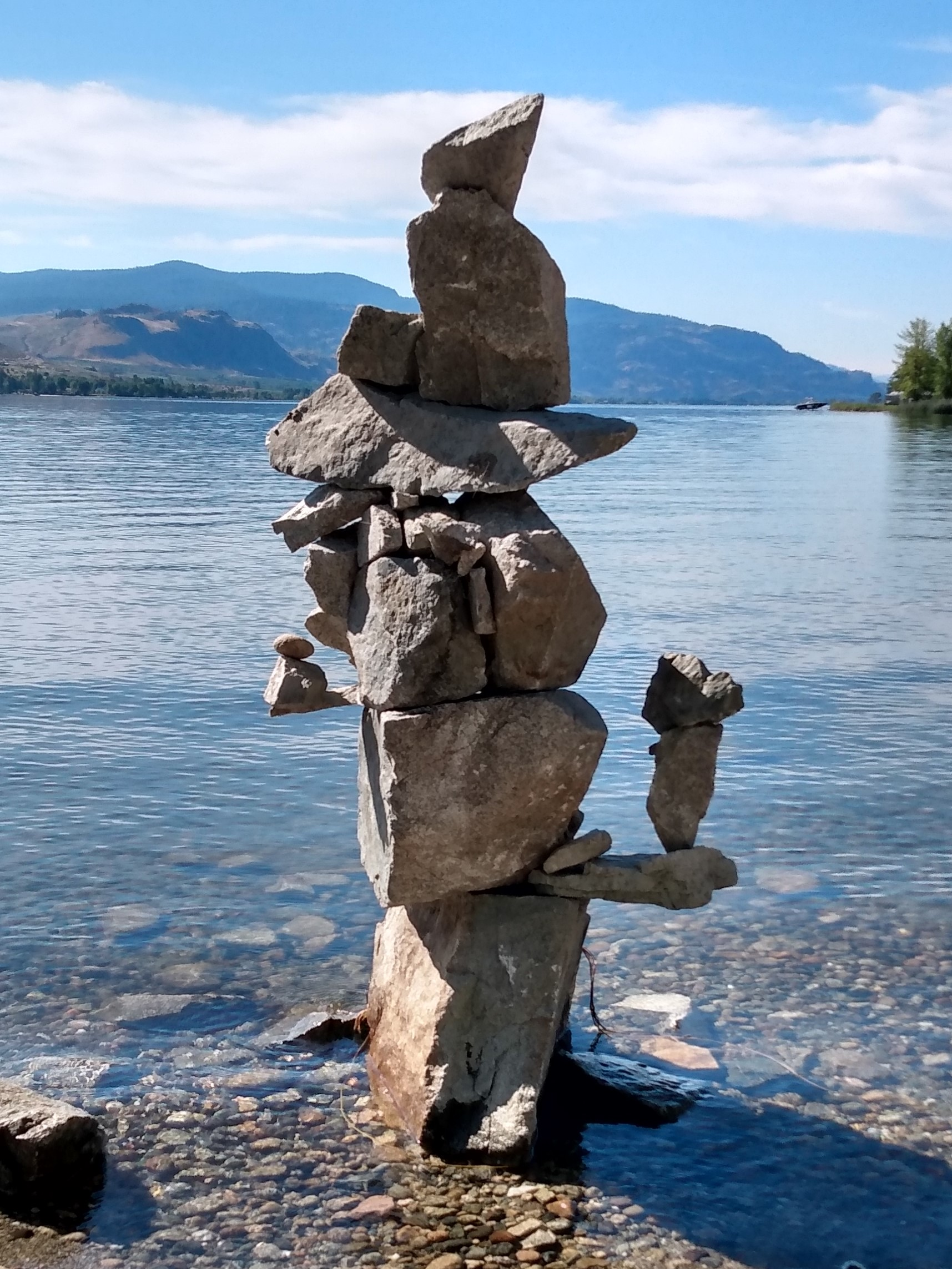
Inuksuk on Osoyoos Lake shore of Sẁiẁs Provincial Park in Osoyoos, looking south with Washington state near Oroville in the distance (July 2020)

== See also ==
- List of lakes of British Columbia
- Zosel Dam
