= Ashnola =

Ashnola is an Okanagan language word of unknown meaning and which is Acnulox in the modern spelling system of that language. It may refer to:

- the Ashnola River, a river in Washington state and British Columbia
- Ashnola Pass, a mountain pass in Washington state
- Ashnola Mountain, a mountain in Washington state
- Ashnola Indian Reserve No. 10, a.k.a. Ashnola 10, an Indian Reserve under the administration of the Lower Similkameen Indian Band in British Columbia
- Ashnola, British Columbia, a locality and former railway point at the confluence of the Ashnola and Similkameen Rivers
