= Chopaka =

Chopaka is the name of a legendary chief of the Okanagan people and may refer to:

- Chopaka, British Columbia, a locality in British Columbia, Canada, and the site of Chopaka Indian Reserves Nos. 7 & 8
- Chopaka Mountain, a mountain in Washington, United States, across the border from Chopaka, British Columbia
- Chopaka Lake, a lake in Washington, United States, on Chopaka Mountain
