= Lower Similkameen Indian Band =

First Nation band government in British Columbia, Canada

The Lower Similkameen Indian Band or Lower Smelqmix (Okanagan: N̓iʔxʷín̓aʔ), is a First Nations band government in the Canadian province of British Columbia. Their office was in the village of Keremeos in the Similkameen region, until 2015 when they moved into their own $7million multi-purpose facility south of Cawston. They are a member of the Okanagan Nation Alliance.

== Population ==
The band's registered population is 500 with 209 band members living off-reserve with a total area of 15,048.80 ha.

The people are known as the Smelqmix (also written as Smalqmix or Sməlqmix), speaking the endangered Nsyilxcen language.

== Indian reserves ==
Indian reserves under the band's administration are spread out over 90km. They are:

- Alexis Indian Reserve No. 9, on the left bank of the Similkameen River 4 miles west of Keremeos, 168.70 ha. 49°13′00″N 119°54′00″W
- Ashnola Indian Reserve No. 10, on the right bank of the Similkameen River at its junction with the Ashnola River, 3415 ha. 49°13′00″N 120°00′00″W
- Blind Creek Indian Reserve No. 6, on Blind Creek, 4 miles southeast of Keremeos, 161 ha. 49°11′00″N 119°44′00″W
- Blind Creek Indian Reserve No. 6A, west of Barcelo Road, 1 mile west of IR No. 6, 0.10 ha. 49°11′00″N 119°45′00″W
- Chopaka Indian Reserve Nos. 7 & 8 (Okanagan: C̓up̓áq̓), on the right bank of the Similkameen River, north of and adjoining the international boundary, 1537.80 ha. These two reserves are the most populated of the band's reserves. 49°02′35″N 119°43′05″W
- Keremeos Forks Indian Reserve Nos. 12 & 12A, on Keremeos Creek at mouth of Marset Creek, 7 miles north of Keremeos, 954.10 ha. 49°18′00″N 119°49′00″W
- Lower Similkameen Indian Reserve No. 2, on the Similkameen River 6 miles southeast of Keremeos, 1293.70 ha. 49°07′00″N 119°45′00″W
- Narcisse's Farm Indian Reserve No. 4, on right bank of the Similkameen River 5 miles southeast of Keremeos, 750.30 ha. 49°08′00″N 119°46′00″W
- Range Indian Reserve No. 13, west of Narcisse's Farm IR No. 4, on left bank of Susap Creek, 6768.10 ha. 49°08′00″N 119°50′00″W

== See also ==
- Okanagan people
