= Nighthawk–Chopaka Border Crossing =

Border crossing between Canada and the United States

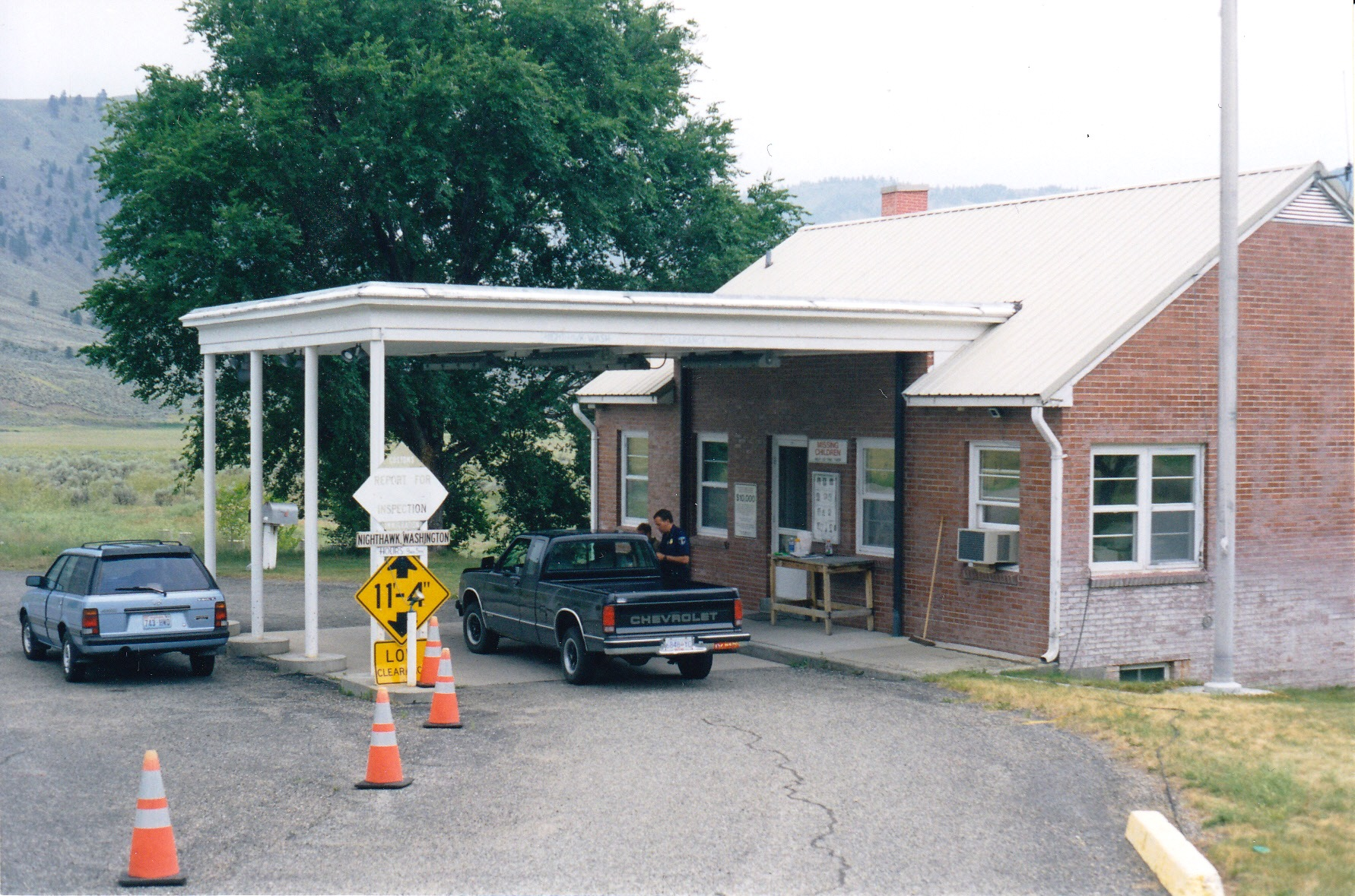
- Former border station at Nighthawk, WA, 1997

Locaiton
- Country: United States; Canada
- Location: Similkameen Road / Nighthawk Road; US Port: Similkameen Road, Loomis, WA 98827; Canadian Port: 100 Nighthawk Road, Cawston BC V0X 1C3
- Coordinates: 49°00′00″N 119°40′15″W

Details
- Opened: 1907

Website
- US Canadian

The Nighthawk–Chopaka Border Crossing connects the town of Loomis, Washington and Cawston, British Columbia on the Canada–United States border. Similkameen Road on the American side joins Nighthawk Road on the Canadian side.

== Railway ==
In April 1907, the rail head of the VV&E, a Great Northern Railway subsidiary, advanced westward across the border. A modest train service operated over the following decades. When the Armstrong bridge, which was about 9 kilometres (6 mi) north of the crossing, washed out in a 1972 flood, cross-border rail service ceased permanently.

== Canadian side ==
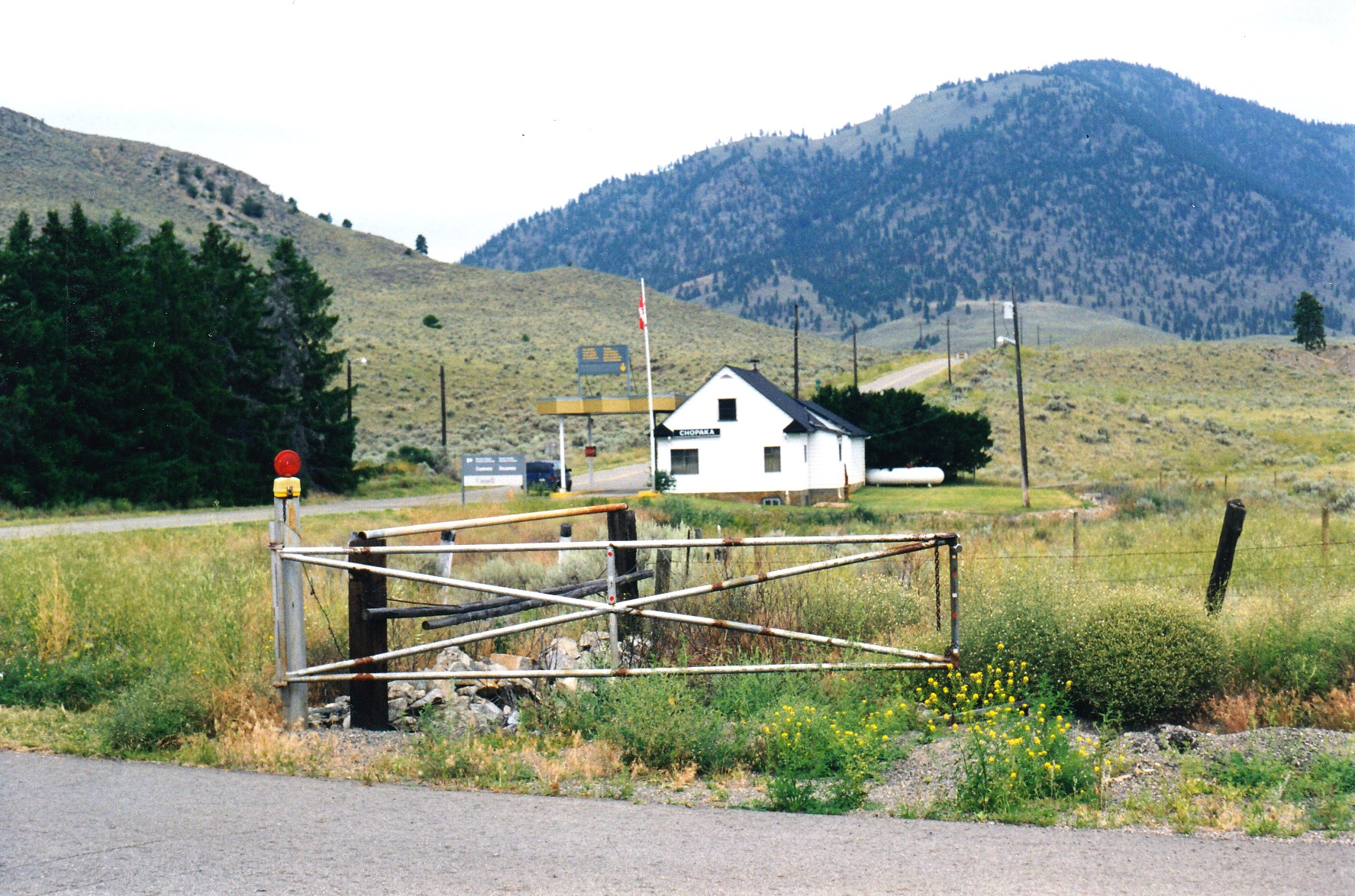
Canadian border station at Chopaka, 1998

A customs office existed at Chopaka during the summer of 1861, before relocating to Osoyoos. The next office opened in 1907 for railway traffic but relocated to the Keremeos preventative station the following year. That office closed in 1917 but reopened in 1940. During the earlier years, a Keremeos officer would travel to Chopka to clear any livestock movements across the border. The Similkameen office opened on the rail line a short distance north of the border in 1917 but closed in 1940. In 1959, the Chopaka station was reopened at the road crossing, which is about 4 kilometres (2 mi) east of the rail crossing. This road crossing existed by at least the early 1930s.

== US side ==
The customs office seems to have opened in 1907. For many years, the Nighthawk trail was popular for liquor smuggling during Prohibition in the United States. In 1929, when border patrols and their propensity to fire weapons increased, the smuggling activity moved farther eastward.

Chopaka Road was parallel to the rail line and crossed the border. In 1952, the Nighthawk border station closed. The location of this station is unclear but it may have been back from the border at the Nighthawk settlement to handle both road and rail traffic. The opening date of the existing road border station is unclear, but likely predated the Canadian station. Initially, a trailer at the border housed the inspection services. In 1962, the US built a small brick border station at this site. Around this time, the US installed a locked gate on the Chopaka Road a mile south of the border.

Averaging just 28 vehicles per day in 2009, the crossing was the least used land border in Washington state at the time.

In 2012, a new facility, which employs advanced technologies, replaced the former border station.

The area west of the station is the most remote part of the contiguous US border, passing through the Cascade Mountains. The next border crossing is 125 miles (201 km) westward at Sumas–Huntingdon Border Crossing. However, many hikers on the Pacific Crest Trail cross between North Cascades National Park and Manning Park without reporting at the nearest official port of entry as legally required.

== See also ==
- List of Canada–United States border crossings

== Sources ==
- Legg, Herbert (1962). Customs Services in Western Canada, 1867–1925. The Creston Review Ltd.
