= School District 53 Okanagan Similkameen =

School district in Canada

Location
- Oliver Cawston; Hedley; Keremeos; Okanagan Falls; Oliver; Osoyoos in Okanagan; Similkameen Canada

District information
- Superintendent: Marcus Toneatto
- Schools: 10
- Budget: CA$22.3 million

Students and staff
- Students: 2,665

Other information
- Website: www.sd53.bc.ca

School District 53 Okanagan Similkameen is a school district that serves fragments of the southern Okanagan and lower Similkameen regions, which include Cawston, Hedley, Keremeos, Okanagan Falls, Oliver, and Osoyoos, totaling to six communities in the district, all of which are in British Columbia, Canada. Its main "maintenance department" office is held in Oliver, consisting of ten schools, five of which are elementary, three are high or secondary schools, while two are alternative schools. This district's superintendent is Marcus Toneatto, while 2,665 students attend schools in it; there are 480 employees for the Okanagan Simlkammen school district. Their motto is "Learning Today for Living Tomorrow", and all places within the district are towns or villages.

In addition to the conventional school programs, School District 53 offers three adult learning outlets, an outreach school, three early learning centres, as well as one elementary hockey academy; the district supports Aboriginal people. It provides a school bus transportation service, in order for children to get to their school and home, being responsible to the Director of Facilities. This bus service has been considered for expansion. School District 53 maintains a policy on emergency, which was amended on April 30, 2008. There is also a "smoke-free" policy that was amended on September 26, 2007.

== Facilities ==
School District 53 Okanagan Similkameen consists of ten schools, five of which are elementary, three are high or secondary schools, while two are alternative schools, within a total of six communities in British Columbia, Canada, in fragments of the southern Okanagan and lower Similkameen regions. The schools of the latter region include Cawston Primary School—held in the town of Cawston—whose principal is Shannon Miller. Cawston School is a Kindergarten to Grade 4 school that is well known for its Weekend Western Day Assembly, held on Victoria Day Weekend and featuring hobby horse barrel racing. The village of Keremeos is home to Similkameen Elementary Secondary School (S.E.S.S.), which holds students from Grades 5 to 12, with the principal being Naren Searcy. Hedley did have a Kindergarten to Grade 4 school of its own until January 2008, when the Okanagan Similkameen district voted four to two to close the school. Linda Thiel was the last principal of Hedley Elementary School and oversaw its closure.

In addition to the schools of the lower Similkameen, the southern Okanagan holds seven of the ten schools part of the district, as well as its main "maintenance department" office, which is held in the town of Oliver. All schools in the district which are part of the Okanagan region maintain the same format: elementary schools have children from Kindergarten to Grade 8, while secondary schools consist of pupils from Grade 8 to 12. This includes Okanagan Falls Elementary School, which is held in the Okanagan Falls town, with Lisa McCall serving as the school's principal.

The Osoyoos town is home to Osoyoos Elementary School—whose principal is Dave Foster —and Osoyoos Secondary School, which is principled by Glen Heinrichs. Since 2001, British Columbia has invested over 4.8 Canadian million dollars on replacing Osoyoos Elementary School, as well as Okanagan Falls Elementary School. It offers the Okanagan Similkameen Learning Centre, which consists of students from Grades 8 to 12; the principal of the learning centre is B. Hansen. Its neighboring town, Oliver, is home to, as of September 2011, Oliver Elementary School and Tuc-el-Nuit Elementary School—the former's principal is Mike Safek, while the latter's is Dave Foster.

The community also had a secondary school, named Southern Okanagan Secondary School, until it was burnt by a fire in September 2011, during the school's multimillion-dollar renovation project. The Royal Canadian Mounted Police's (RCMP) investigation found no conclusion. The Government of British Columbia are contributing to the school's rebuilding; its construction began in spring 2012, being slated for completion in 2013.

In addition to the conventional school programs, School District 53 offers three adult learning outlets, an outreach school, three early learning centres, as well as one elementary hockey academy. It also works with a number of Aboriginal people, having signed an enhancement agreement to improve academic achievement of them. 2,665 students attend schools in this district, whose superintendent is Beverley Young.

== Demographics ==
1,303 of those 2,665 students within the district attend elementary schools, while 1,202 attend secondary schools; 102 are adult education students. School District 53 contains 480 employees, and its motto is "Learning Today for Living Tomorrow". While its board chair is Marieze Tarr, its secretary treasurer is Lynda Minnabarriet and its MLA is John Slater. The district has five trustees. It provides a school bus transportation service, in order to get children to their school and home, being responsible to the Director of Facilities. The bus service has been considered for expansion.

The British Columbia province gives funds to the school district, so that it can maintain their schools correctly. The amount given is based on the number of kids that are enrolled for the year. Further money is often left over by the end of the year. StrongStart BC, an "early learning initiatives" program, operates at three schools within the district, Okanagan Falls Elementary School, Oliver Elementary School, Cawston Primary School, and Osoyoos Elementary School. The district's boundaries include three First Nations Bands: the Osoyoos Indian Band and the upper and lower Similkameen Bands, all of which are Indian governments.

An emergency—a "sudden", "unexpected" occurrence that requires action for a situation—at schools within the district 53 scope can result in school or bus transportation facilities. This district's policy on emergency was amended on April 30, 2008, which includes fire, threats or facilities, violence, school bus accident, serve weather, earthquake, hazardous spills, accidents, explosions, or floods. The policy was amended because the district recognizes the importance of emergencies, specifically during school's session, that could be both natural and human, hence why it necessitates to develop plans for emergencies. It also maintains a "smoke-free" policy, meaning that it is prohibited to smoke in a district 53 area. This rule was amended on September 26, 2007.

== See also ==
- List of school districts in British Columbia
