= Laslo Babits =

Canadian javelin thrower (1958–2013)

Personal information
- Born: April 17, 1958 Oliver, British Columbia, Canada
- Died: June 12, 2013 (aged 55) Vancouver, Canada

Sport
- Sport: Track and field
Medal record
Representing Canada
Commonwealth Games
Silver medal – second place	1982 Brisbane	Javelin throw
Pan American Games
Gold medal – first place	1983 Caracas	Javelin throw

Laslo Babits (April 17, 1958 – June 12, 2013) was a male javelin thrower from Canada. He competed for his native country at the 1984 Summer Olympics in Los Angeles, California, finishing in 8th place. He set his personal best (86.90 metres) in 1984.

== Achievements ==
Year	Competition	Venue	Position	Notes
Representing Canada
1982	Commonwealth Games	Brisbane, Australia	2nd	84.88 m
1983	Pan American Games	Caracas, Venezuela	1st	81.40 m
1983	World Championships	Helsinki, Finland	16th	74.16 m
1984	Olympic Games	Los Angeles, United States	8th	80.68 m

== Personal life ==
Laslo graduated from Southern Okanagan Secondary School in 1977. He competed for the Washington State Cougars track and field team in the NCAA.
