= Cathedral Provincial Park and Protected Area =

Provincial park in British Columbia, Canada

Coordinates: 49°04′00″N 120°11′00″W

- IUCN category Ib (wilderness area)
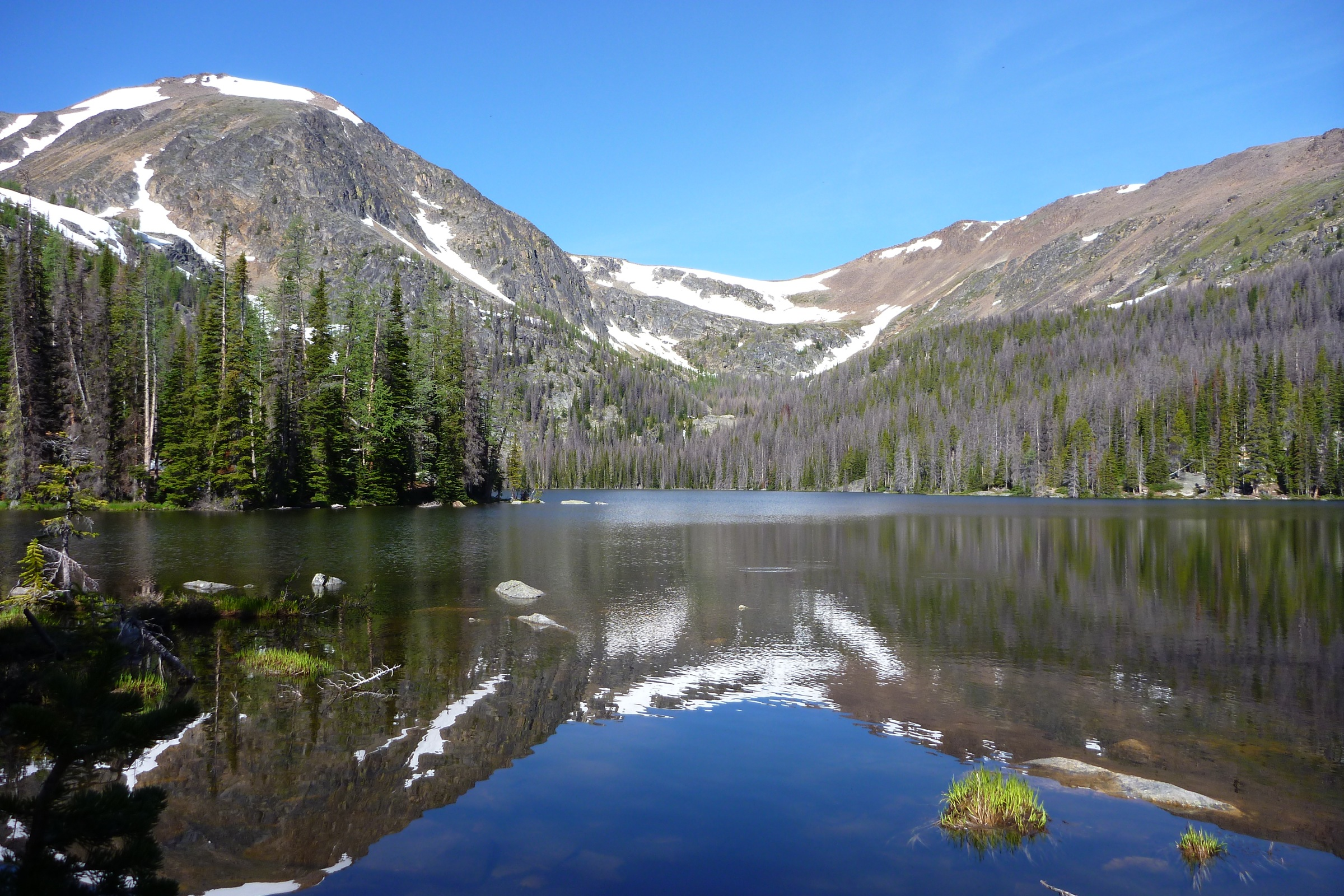
- Quiniscoe Lake of the Cathedral Lakes

- Location within British Columbia
- Interactive map of Cathedral Provincial Park and Protected Area
- Location: Okanagan-Similkameen, British Columbia, Canada
- Nearest town: Princeton, British Columbia
- Area: 33,272 ha (82,220 acres)
- Established: 1968
- Governing body: BC Parks

Cathedral Provincial Park and Protected Area, usually known as Cathedral Provincial Park and also as Cathedral Park, is a provincial park in British Columbia, Canada. It is located east of E.C. Manning Provincial Park, south of BC Highway 3, and southeast of the town of Princeton, and southwest of Keremeos. Its southern boundary is the border with the United States. Much of the park is the basin of the Ashnola River.

The park has a mixed history of use from Indigenous Peoples and a variety of endemic species, as well as resource extraction, including forestry and recreational use such as hiking, camping, and fishing. Today the park primarily serves the purpose of facilitating recreation as a "Class A" provincial park. Climate change poses a threat to the park due to recent wildfires. The future of the park depends on the management of these issues and more.

== History ==
The park gets its name from Cathedral Mountain, near the international border. The peak was named in 1901 by Carl and George Smith on a United States Geological Survey expedition, who are believed to be the first to have ascended the summit. The original area of Cathedral Provincial Park was established on May 2, 1968, with an area of 7,372 hectares (18,216 acres). This park ran in a narrow north–south corridor along Lakeview Creek from the Ashnola River in the North to the international boundary. The park included the Cathedral Lakes area.

After a lengthy consultation process with local interest groups, industry, and researchers, the park was expanded to have boundaries that roughly matched natural boundaries. This expanded the park to an area of roughly 33,000 hectares (82,000 acres), with the Ashnola River forming the Western and Northern boundaries of the park and Ewart Creek forming the Eastern boundary, with certain exceptions for existing mineral claims. On April 18, 2001, the contiguous conservation area protected was expanded with the establishment of the 25,889 hectares (63,970 acres) Snowy Protected Area.

== Recreation ==
The park is home to front-country vehicle-accessible camping as well as back-country camping. There are multiple day-use areas in the park. Accommodation is provided within the park at the Cathedral Lakes Lodge. There are no public roads within the park itself. The park is connected to E. C. Manning Provincial Park by the Centennial Trail from Osoyoos to Simon Fraser University. Though it has not been maintained recently, and is no longer appears on maps of Manning Park.

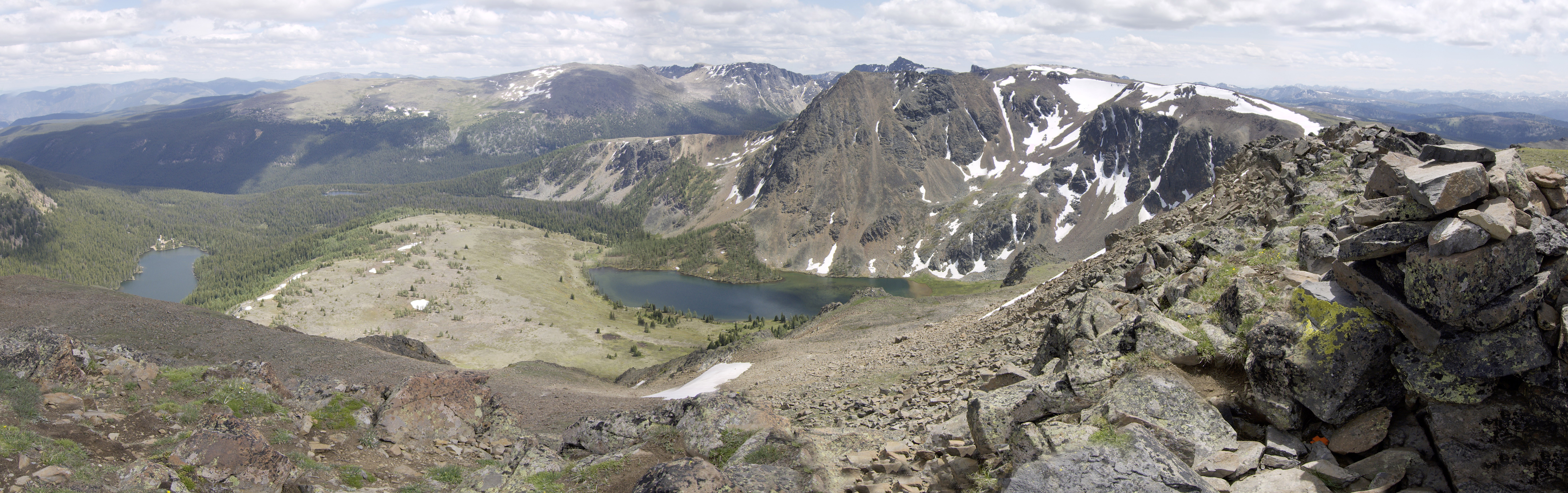
A view from Quiniscoe Peak in Cathedral Provincial Park
