= Grist Mill (Keremeos) =

Historic site owned by the province of British Columbia

Grist Mill and Gardens Historic Site
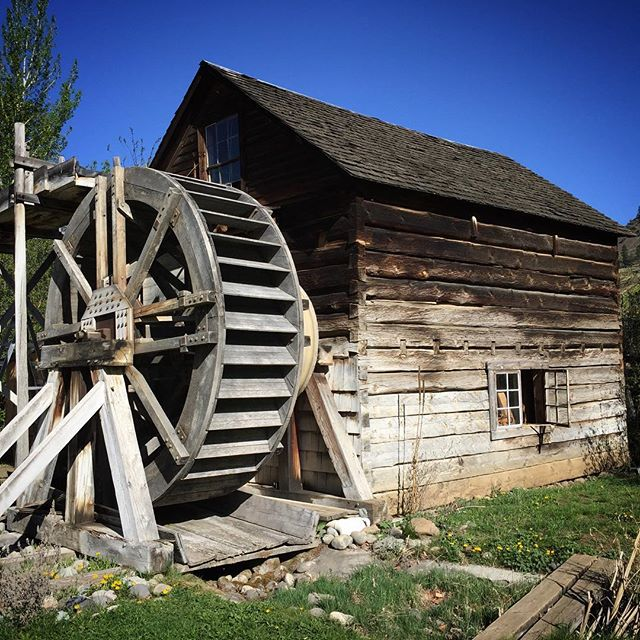
- Type: Historic Site
- Location: 2691 Upper Bench Rd; Keremeos, British Columbia; V0X1N4
- Coordinates: 49.21445°N 119.80684°W
- Area: 12 acres (4.9 ha)
- Elevation: 1,400 feet (430 m)
- Built: 1877
- Built for: Barrington Price
- Restored: 1984
- Restored by: BC Heritage Trust
- Current use: Historic Site
- Visitors: 14,000 (in 2019)
- Governing body: Grist Mill Operations Society
- Owner: Government of British Columbia
- Website: oldgristmill.ca

The Grist Mill and Gardens Historic Site, located in the Similkameen River Valley near the Village of Keremeos, is a heritage site owned by the Province of British Columbia. It is located just north of the junction of the Crowsnest Highway and Highway 3A.

The site consists of a working waterwheel-powered grist mill building constructed in 1877 with its historic milling machinery, an historic general store and residence, and an apple house/root cellar as well as several other modern or replica structures.
