= Enloe =

Enloe may refer to:

- Enloe, Texas, an unincorporated community in Delta County
- William G. Enloe High School, public high school in Raleigh, North Carolina
- Enloe Dam and Powerplant, a powerplant in Okanogan County, Washington

== Persons with the surname Enloe ==
- Benjamin A. Enloe (1848–1922), U.S. Congressman from Tennessee
- William G. Enloe (1902–1972), mayor of Raleigh, North Carolina
- Cynthia Enloe (b. 1938), feminist writer
- Jason Enloe (b. 1974), professional golfer
