= Olalla, British Columbia =

Olalla
- Olalla
- Location of Olalla in British Columbia
- Coordinates: 49°16′00″N 119°50′00″W
- Country: Canada
- Province: British Columbia

Population
  - Total: 415
- Area codes: 250, 778

Olalla is an unincorporated settlement in the South Okanagan region of the Southern Interior of British Columbia, Canada, located southwest of Penticton (the nearest large city) and just north of Keremeos. Kaleden, just northeast beyond Olalla along BC Highway 3A, occupies the pass dividing the Okanagan Valley beyond and the Similkameen Country of which Olalla is a part.

Olalla is a retirement community.

== School ==
The Similkameen Elementary Secondary School in Keremeos serves as the primary education centre for the region.

== Name & History ==
Olalla's name is a local adaptation of the Salish and Chinook word for "berries", a reference to locally abundant Saskatoon berries. The word is listed as olallie or ollalie in many Chinook Jargon lexicons. Olalla was the site of a mining boom in the 1890s. Briefly it was the bustling centre for several productive mines, but ore deposits did not meet expectations; the town faded and it became a small collection of homes on the highway between Keremeos and Penticton.

== See also ==
- List of Chinook Jargon placenames
