= Sheep Mountain (Okanogan County, Washington) =

Mountain in Washington (state), United States

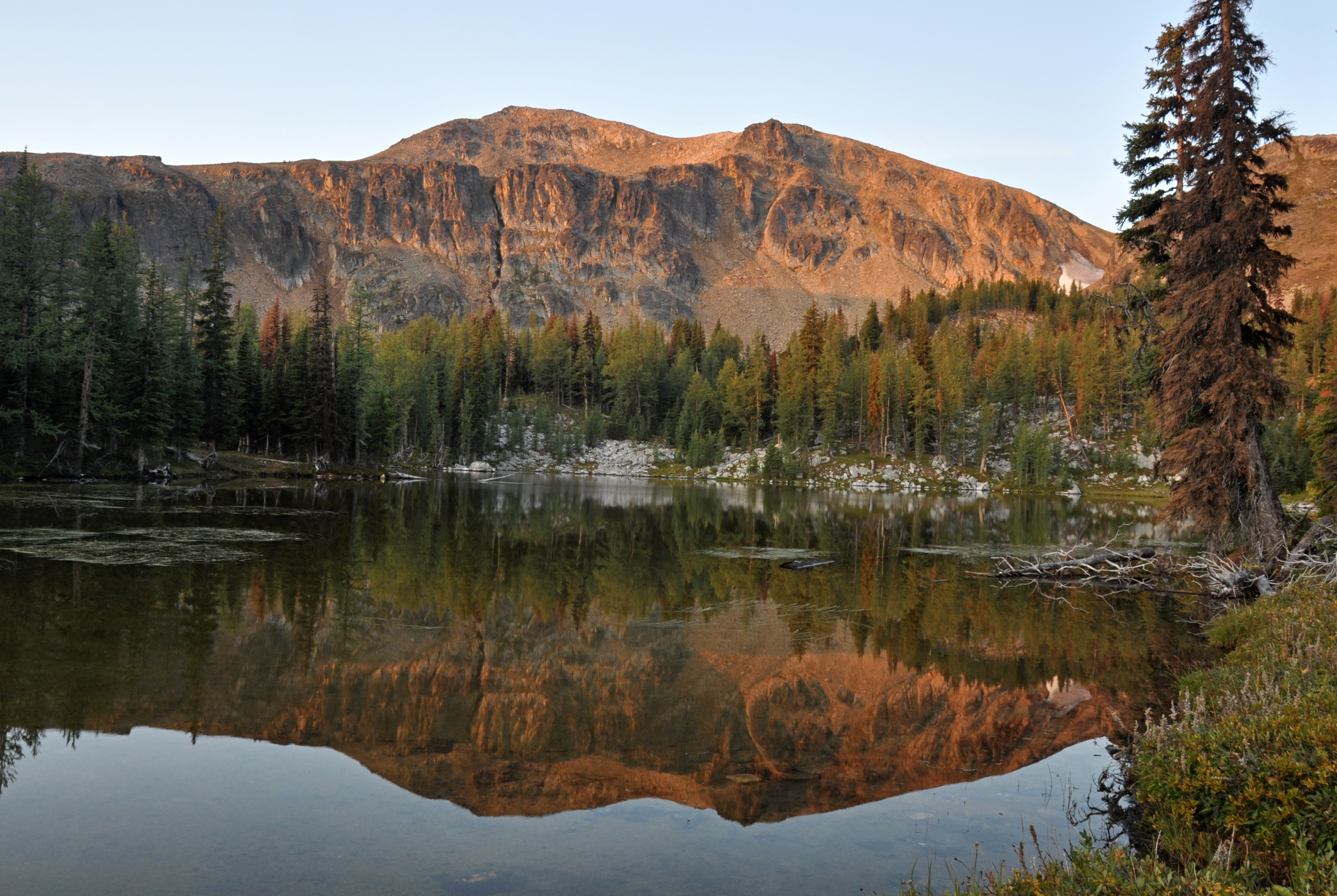
- Sheep Mountain reflected in Ramon Lakes at sunrise

Highest point
- Elevation: 8,274 ft (2,522 m)
- Prominence: 2,034 ft (620 m)
- Listing: List of highest mountain peaks in Washington
- Coordinates: 48°58′36″N 120°23′19″W

Geography
- Location within Washington (state) Location within the United States
- Interactive map of Sheep Mountain
- Location: Pasayten Wilderness; Okanogan County; Washington, U.S.
- Parent range: Okanogan Range; North Cascades; Cascade Range
- Topo map: USGS Ashnola Mountain

Geology
- Rock type(s): Granodiorite, Gneiss

Climbing
- First ascent: 1925 Survey party
- Easiest route: Hiking Southeast slopes

Sheep Mountain is an 8,274-foot (2,522-metre) mountain summit located in Okanogan County in Washington state. It is part of the Okanogan Range which is a sub-range of the North Cascades and Cascade Range. The mountain is situated less than 2 miles (3.2 km) south of the Canada–United States border, on the east side of the Cascade crest, in the Pasayten Wilderness, on land managed by the Okanogan–Wenatchee National Forest. The nearest higher peak is Andrew Peak, 8.3 miles (13.4 km) to the east-southeast. The Pacific Northwest Trail traverses the slopes of Sheep Mountain as it crosses Peeve Pass. Precipitation runoff from Sheep Mountain drains west into Peeve Creek, or east into tributaries of Ashnola River. The mountain was so named because for 40 years the meadows surrounding it were prime grazing land for sheep in the summer, before the protection of wilderness designation.

== Climate ==
Most weather fronts originate in the Pacific Ocean, and travel northeast toward the Cascade Mountains. As fronts approach the North Cascades, they are forced upward by the peaks of the Cascade Range, causing them to drop their moisture in the form of rain or snowfall onto the Cascades (Orographic lift). As a result, the west side of the North Cascades experiences higher precipitation than the east side, especially during the winter months in the form of snowfall. During winter months, weather is usually cloudy, but, due to high pressure systems over the Pacific Ocean that intensify during summer months, there is often little or no cloud cover during the summer.

== Geology ==
The North Cascades features some of the most rugged topography in the Cascade Range with craggy peaks, spires, bridges, and deep glacial valleys. Geological events occurring many years ago created the diverse topography and drastic elevation changes over the Cascade Range leading to the various climate differences.

The history of the formation of the Cascade Mountains dates back millions of years ago to the late Eocene Epoch. With the North American Plate overriding the Pacific Plate, episodes of volcanic igneous activity persisted. In addition, small fragments of the oceanic and continental lithosphere called terranes created the North Cascades about 50 million years ago.

During the Pleistocene period dating back over two million years ago, glaciation advancing and retreating repeatedly scoured the landscape leaving deposits of rock debris. The U-shaped cross section of the river valleys is a result of recent glaciation. Uplift and faulting in combination with glaciation have been the dominant processes which have created the tall peaks and deep valleys of the North Cascades area.

== See also ==
- Geography of the North Cascades
- Geology of the Pacific Northwest
