= Similkameen Elementary Secondary School =

Location
- 830 2nd Avenue; Keremeos, British Columbia, V0X 1N0; Canada
- Coordinates: 49°12′34″N 119°49′08″W

Information
- Funding type: Public
- School board: School District 53 Okanagan Similkameen
- Staff: ~40
- Grades: 5–12
- Enrollment: ~300
- Website: www.sd53.bc.ca/sess/

Similkameen Elementary Secondary School (SESS) is a public school in the village of Keremeos, British Columbia, Canada. It is a combined elementary and high school with about 300 students from grades five to twelve. SESS is part of BC School District 53 and serves multiple communities in the Similkameen Okanagan Valley region around Keremeos, including Cawston, Hedley, and Olalla.

Sports available at Similkameen include cross country for boys and girls, soccer (co-ed), basketball (co-ed), and golf (co-ed), plus volleyball for girls. The school is ranked single A by size.
