= Osoyoos Secondary School =

Osoyoos Secondary
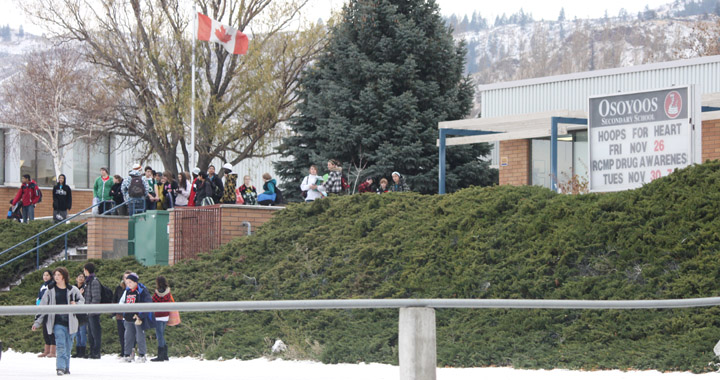

Location
- 5800 115th St. Osoyoos, British Columbia, V0H 1V0; Canada
- Coordinates: 49.0215°N 119.4812°W

Information
- School type: Public, high school
- School board: School District 53 Okanagan Similkameen
- School number: 5314008
- Principal: Mr Scott Tremblay
- Staff: 22
- Grades: 8-12
- Enrollment: 202 (September 28th 2018)
- Language: English
- Colours: Red and White
- Team name: Rattlers
- Website: www.sd53.bc.ca/oss/

Osoyoos Secondary is a public high school in Osoyoos, British Columbia that is part of School District 53 Okanagan Similkameen.

Osoyoos Secondary is located in the Okanagan Valley in south-central British Columbia. The school population includes 202 students from grade 8–12, 18 teachers and 10 support staff. School District 53 trustees voted on April 6, 2016, to close the school in order to avoid budget deficit. The students and town fought back and got the school to stay open.
