= Chopaka Lake =

Lake in Okanogan County, Washington, United States

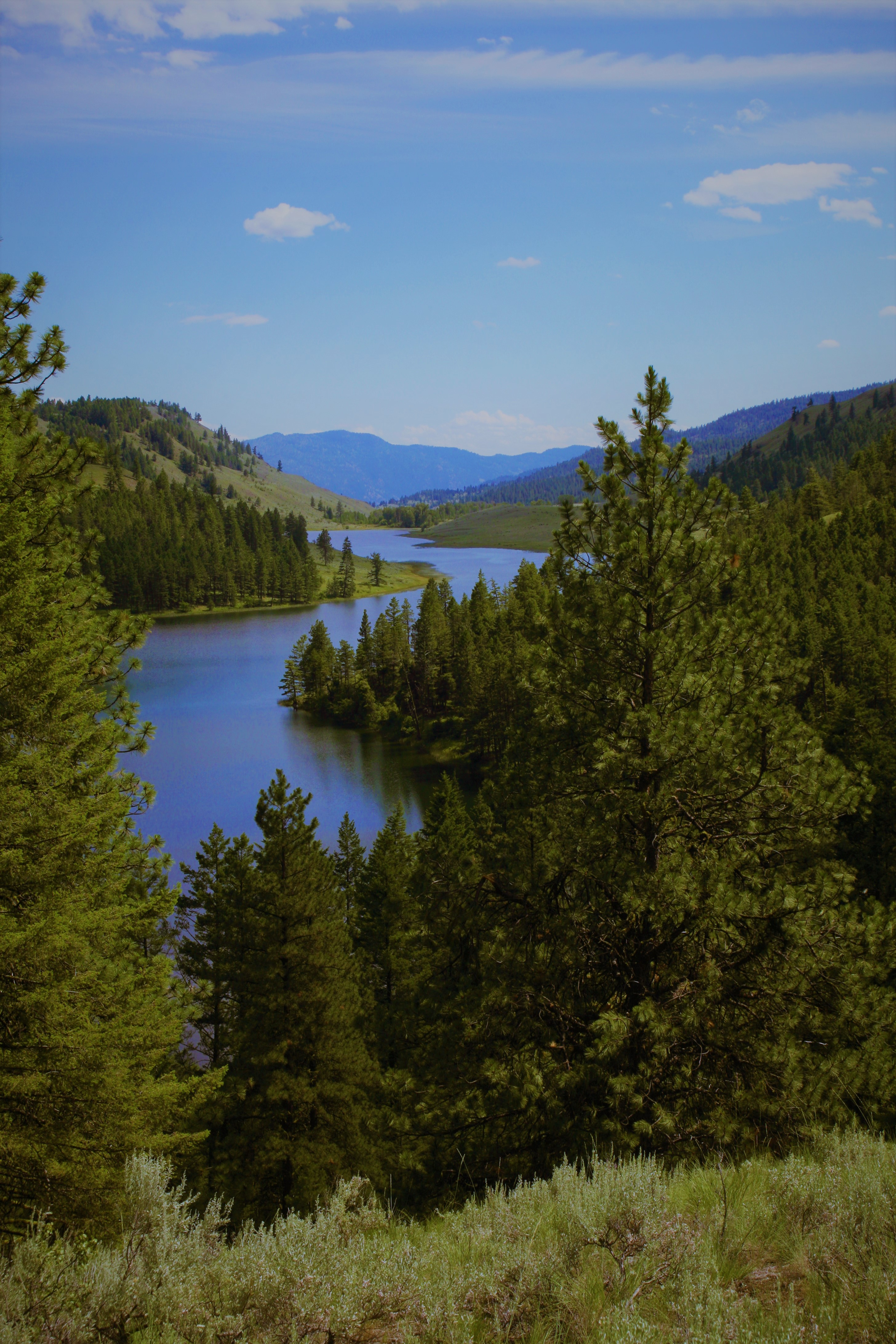

- Location within Washington (state)
- Location: Okanogan County, Washington, United States
- Coordinates: 48°54′42″N 119°41′56″W
- Primary outflows: Chopaka Creek
- Basin countries: United States
- Surface area: 150 acres (0.6 km^{2})
- Max. depth: 70 ft (21 m)
- Surface elevation: 2,910 feet (890 m)

Chopaka Lake is a lake in Okanogan County, Washington. It covers an area of approximately 150 acres (0.6 km^{2}), is over 70 ft (21 m) deep at its deepest point, and is 2,910 ft (886 m) in elevation. The lake's name is that of a legendary Okanogan hunter who was transformed to stone by Coyote. It serves as an irrigation reservoir for local ranchers. Chopaka Lake is a favorite among fly fishers who cast for rainbow trout.

== See also ==
- Chopaka, British Columbia
- Mount Chopaka
