= Chopaka, British Columbia =

Chopaka
- Location of Chopaka in British Columbia
- Coordinates: 48°59′59″N 119°43′04″W
- Country: Canada
- Province: British Columbia
- Region: Similkameen Country
- Regional District: Okanagan-Similkameen
- Area codes: 250, 778, 236, & 672
- Highway: Highway 3

Chopaka is an unincorporated community in the Similkameen region of south central British Columbia. Immediately north of the Canada–United States border, the population centre is on the west shore of the Similkameen River. The Nighthawk–Chopaka Border Crossing lies to the east. Off BC Highway 3, the locality is by road about 96 kilometres (60 mi) southeast of Princeton and 75 kilometres (47 mi) south of Penticton.

== Name origin ==
"Chopaka" (pronounced like tobacco) signifies "lofty" or "grand" and refers to Chopaka Mountain, which dominates the area. The word is the anglicized version of "c̓up̓áq̓", which can mean "sticking out mountain". According to legend, Coyote turned an indigenous hunter by this name into stone or the mountain represents a transformed maiden. Another translation is soapstone, which was used in making pipes and the word may also refer to the pipe itself.

== First Nations ==
Incidents of genocidal tribal warfare occurred in the South Similkameen during the early 1700s. The Okanagan-speaking peoples progressively replaced the Stuwix and Thompson peoples during the later part of that century.

The establishment of the international border in 1846 created a barrier within a traditional territory. The Similkameen River mouth (in the US) was an important winter village site for the Okanagans (living in Canada).

In late 1870s or early 1880s, a Roman Catholic (RC) church was built at Chopaka. In 1878, Gilbert Malcolm Sproat set aside the land for the reserves, which were amended and increased by his successor Peter O’Reilly in the 1880s. The border ones are called Chopaka 7 and 8.

In 1890, a new RC church was built. The reserves were surveyed in 1889 and listed in 1902. The Vancouver, Victoria and Eastern Railway (VV&E) expropriated 47 hectares (117 acres) across several reserves for a right-of-way in 1905. The next year, the band chief complained the expropriation assessment grossly undervalued the land. Local rancher R.C. Armstrong supported the complaint. However, a review did not change the original compensation package. The railway construction included moving the church from the right-of-way.

The absence of an indigenous school suggests generations were never schooled or attended a church boarding school in Washington State.

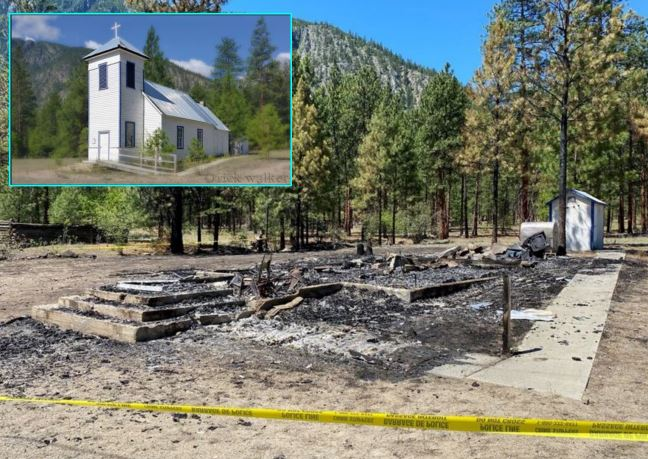
Our Lady of Lourdes Catholic Church, Chopaka, 2021

In 1923, a cement foundation, sacristy, and priest accommodation were added to the church.

By the 1960s, a locked gated blocked the former cross-border road beside the railway track. Formerly, locals had moved freely both ways across the border without encountering any bureaucracy.

In 1995, the Lower Similkameen Band submitted that the VV&E had paid inadequate compensation and that the abandoned right-of-way should revert to reserve status. The next year, the claim was rejected. In 2003, an enquiry into this rejection began. In 2008, the Commission determined the assessment per acre was grossly disproportionate to non-reserve lands and recommended adequate compensation be negotiated. Since the VV&E easement terminated no later than 1985, the Commission recommended that this strip be legally restored to being fully reserve land.

In 2009, when the requirement to have a passport to cross the border was implemented, First Nations staged a protest, cutting the barbed wire in this locality and making a symbolic crossing of the boundary line.

In 2015, the new administrative and community building for the Lower Similkameen Band opened on the hillside in the vicinity of the former Similkameen train station.

In 2021, the serviceable Chopaka church burned to the ground in a suspected arson incident.

== Railway ==
The westward advance of the VV & E railway reached the border at Chopaka in 1907. In 1923, the railway built a barn at the station. Passenger services ceased in the 1950s.

== Ferry and roads ==
The Dewdney Trail to Osoyoos passed through the area. A wagon road later followed the east shore of the river toward the border.

Prior to the erection of the Armstrong rail bridge in 1907, the Armstrong family operated a ferry for many years. In 1931, the present Chopaka Road bridge was planned. Unclear is whether pedestrians had used the rail bridge up to this time or the public Chopaka bridge, known to exist at least during the 1910s, was in the vicinity.

To address the predicament when high water made crossing the river impractical, a road was constructed in 1911 on the west shore to the border, which provided the Armstong family and other residents with an outlet. The reconstruction and paving of BC Highway 3A north from Keremeos, which was completed in 1948, largely diverted traffic away from Similkameen.

The wooden howe truss that underwent extensive repairs in 1956–57 was assumedly the present bridge. In 1964–65, the highway was paved. Through traffic to Osoyoos was restored in 1965 with the completion of the highway over Richter Pass.

== Former Similkameen general community ==
Bob Stevenson, a miner arrived in 1860 but soon moved on. He turned over his land to Daniel McCurdy and his family, who came about 1885. That year, R.C. Armstrong settled on lands directly abutting the Lower Similkameen reserves.

If not already more narrowly defined as a location, government funding for the Similkameen school construction made it more precise by the early 1890s. The one room 7-by-11-metre (24 by 36 ft) school was built about 1.6 kilometres (1 mi) north of the settlement on the southern boundary of the McCurdy ranch. School was held in the McCurdy cabin for three months from September 1892, because the schoolhouse was not finished. R.C. Armstrong's ranch, 19 kilometres (12 mi) south of Keremeos, formed the southern boundary of the Similkameen school district. By 1897, a sawmill existed.

Daniel McCurdy was the inaugural postmaster 1906–1919. The Similkameen post office was about 2.4 kilometres (1.5 mi) south of Cawston. The Chopaka post office operated March–October 1908.

After the Keremeos school opened, Similkameen student numbers dwindled. For lengthy periods, the school was not open, either unable to attract a minimum number of pupils or a teacher. However, an assumption that the school finally closed in 1916, when the Cawston school was established, is incorrect, because 12 pupils were still enrolled in 1918–19. To not have contravened government policy at the time, the few First Nations children who attended may have been mixed race.

Similkameen was also one of the earliest border outposts in the interior and Daniel McCurdy was for four years customs officer in the 1910s. By that time, the Armstrong family operated a significant sheep ranch.

In 1935, the former schoolhouse burned down. In 1939, the post office closed. By this time, Similkameen ceased to be mentioned as a place. The McCurdy Private Cemetery, on the former McCurdy property, includes internments of non-family residents. The abandoned McCurdy cabin, once known as the first Lower Similkameen school, is now considered to be within the Chopaka area.

== Maps ==
- VV&E rail line map.
- Okanagan Circuit, 1918.
- "Rand McNally BC map". www.davidrumsey.com. 1925.
- "AA Official motorist's guide of BC". library.ubc.ca. 1931. p. 50.
- "Standard Oil BC map". www.davidrumsey.com. 1937.
