= Ashnola Mountain =

Mountain in the United States of America

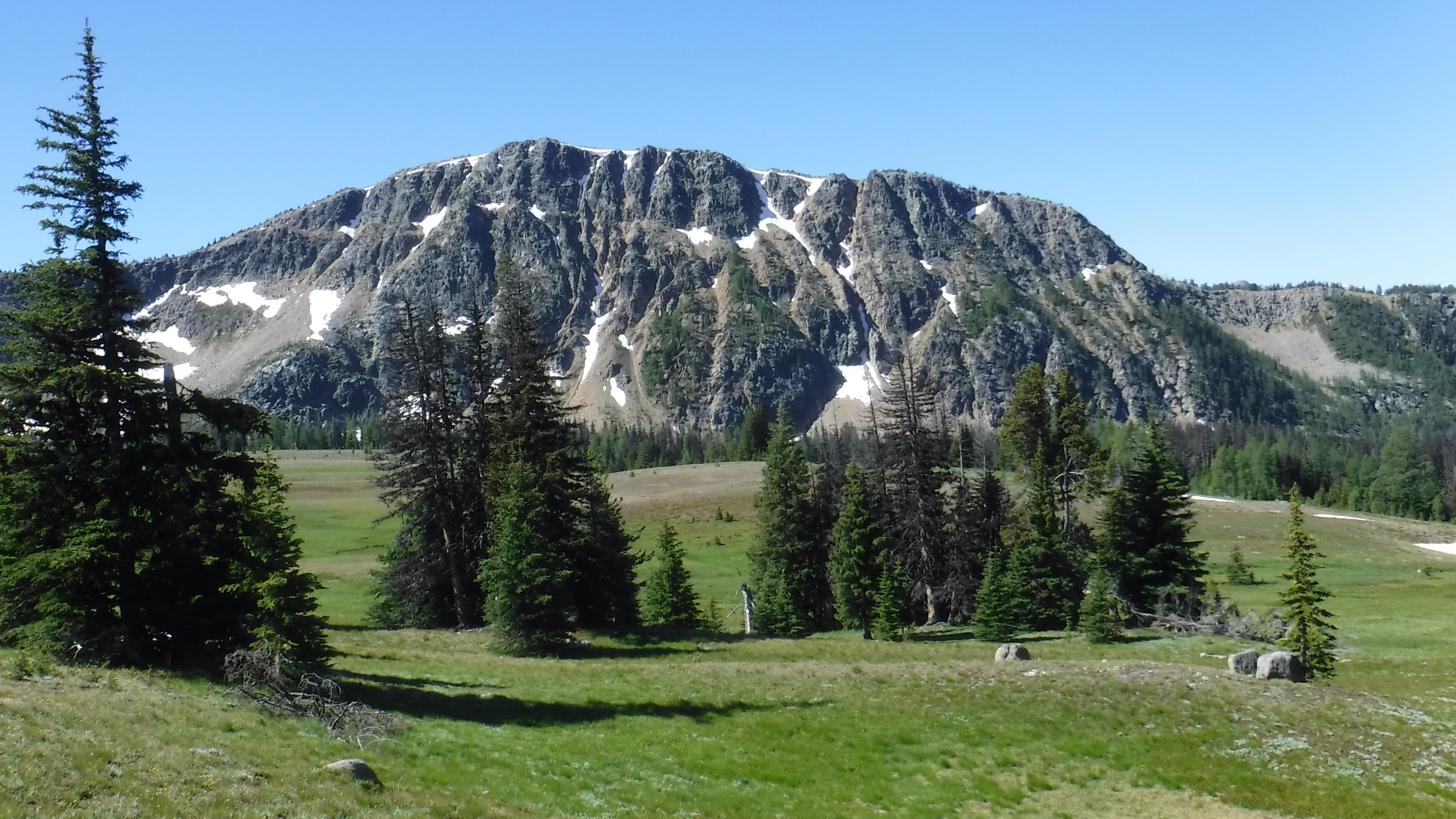
- Ashnola Mountain from Whistler Basin

Highest point
- Elevation: 7,782 ft (2,372 m) NAVD 88
- Prominence: 300 ft (91 m)
- Coordinates: 48°55′19″N 120°24′01″W

Geography
- Location within Washington (state)
- Location: Okanogan County, Washington, U.S.
- Parent range: Cascade Range
- Topo map: USGS Ashnola Mountain

Ashnola Mountain is a mountain in the Okanagan Range of the North Cascades in Washington state, located near Ashnola Pass and the headwaters of the Ashnola River, which flows north into British Columbia, Canada, to join the Similkameen River.

== Name origin ==
See Also: Ashnola River
