= Loomis, Washington =

Loomis
- census-designated place
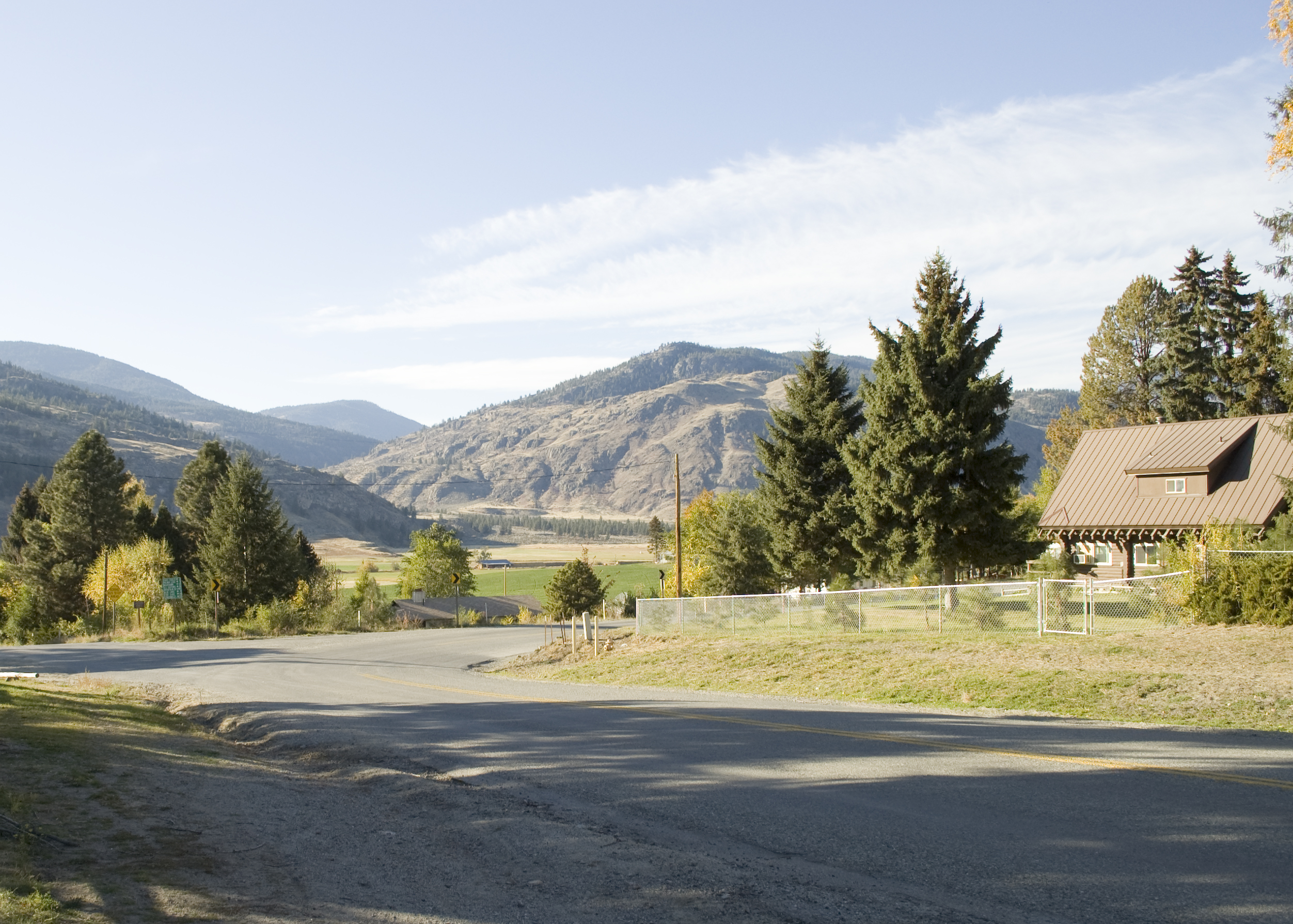
- A view from Loomis

- Position in Washington.
- Coordinates: 48°49′20″N 119°37′50″W
- Country: United States
- State: Washington
- County: Okanogan

Area
  - Total: 0.85 sq mi (2.2 km^{2})
  - Land: 0.85 sq mi (2.2 km^{2})
  - Water: 0 sq mi (0 km^{2})
- Elevation: 1,273 ft (388 m)

Population (2010)
  - Total: 159
  - Density: 190/sq mi (72/km^{2})
- Time zone: UTC−8 (Pacific (PST))
  - Summer (DST): UTC−7 (PDT)
- ZIP Code: 98827
- Area code: 509
- GNIS feature IDs: 2586736

Loomis is a census-designated place (CDP) in Okanogan County, Washington, United States. As of the 2020 census, Loomis had a population of 161. Its area is 0.85 square miles (2.2 km^{2}), which is all land and no water.

== History ==
A post office called Loomis has been in operation since 1889. The community was named after J. A. Loomis, a local storekeeper.

On November 3, 1901, J. M. Haggerty was tarred and feathered in Loomis. He made comments to The Spokesman-Review about the lack of success of the Palmer Mountain Tunnel Company. The comments were resented and a mob was waiting for him when he stepped off the stage. During an impromptu mass meeting, "Suddenly a dozen men grabbed Haggerty, and before half the crowd knew what was happening a bucket of tar and pillows were produced." After half an hour of being paraded through the street covered in tar and feathers, he was released.

== Climate ==
=== North Star Ranch ===
According to the Köppen climate classification system, North Star Ranch has a cold semi-arid climate (BSk) with warm summers and cold winters. Dew points (how humid it feels) are typically very dry even during the summer months. Because of this, summer heat index values are often a few degrees lower than the ambient air temperature. Since 1981, the highest air temperature was 99.6 °F (37.6 °C) on July 23, 2006, and the highest daily average mean dew point was 57.0 °F (13.9 °C) on June 29, 2013. Severe thunderstorms are very rare. December is the average wettest month of the year which correlates with the peak frequency of storms crossing the area via the Pacific Ocean. Since 1981, the wettest calendar day was 1.60 inches (41 mm) on May 26, 1998. During the winter months, the plant hardiness zone is 5b with an average annual extreme minimum air temperature of −12.9 °F (−24.9 °C). Since 1981, the coldest air temperature was −17.1 °F (−27.3 °C) on December 29, 1990. Episodes of extreme cold and wind can occur with wind chill values < −26 °F (−32 °C). North Star Ranch averages ≈ 24 inches (61 cm) of snow per cool season.

Climate data for North Star Ranch, Elevation 3,648 ft (1,112 m), 1981-2010 normals, extremes 1981-2018
Month	Jan	Feb	Mar	Apr	May	Jun	Jul	Aug	Sep	Oct	Nov	Dec	Year
Record high °F (°C)	52.7 (11.5)	54.8 (12.7)	67.8 (19.9)	80.0 (26.7)	93.8 (34.3)	98.8 (37.1)	99.6 (37.6)	97.5 (36.4)	93.5 (34.2)	79.5 (26.4)	59.9 (15.5)	48.9 (9.4)	99.6 (37.6)
Mean daily maximum °F (°C)	32.2 (0.1)	36.5 (2.5)	43.6 (6.4)	52.7 (11.5)	61.3 (16.3)	68.0 (20.0)	76.3 (24.6)	76.3 (24.6)	67.4 (19.7)	52.4 (11.3)	37.7 (3.2)	29.7 (−1.3)	52.9 (11.6)
Daily mean °F (°C)	26.2 (−3.2)	29.4 (−1.4)	35.1 (1.7)	42.7 (5.9)	50.6 (10.3)	57.2 (14.0)	64.7 (18.2)	64.9 (18.3)	56.8 (13.8)	44.1 (6.7)	31.8 (−0.1)	23.9 (−4.5)	44.0 (6.7)
Mean daily minimum °F (°C)	20.2 (−6.6)	22.3 (−5.4)	26.6 (−3.0)	32.8 (0.4)	39.9 (4.4)	46.3 (7.9)	53.1 (11.7)	53.4 (11.9)	46.2 (7.9)	35.9 (2.2)	26.0 (−3.3)	18.1 (−7.7)	35.1 (1.7)
Record low °F (°C)	−12.8 (−24.9)	−13.4 (−25.2)	2.3 (−16.5)	19.6 (−6.9)	27.8 (−2.3)	34.5 (1.4)	38.5 (3.6)	37.0 (2.8)	30.5 (−0.8)	9.8 (−12.3)	−8.9 (−22.7)	−17.1 (−27.3)	−17.1 (−27.3)
Average precipitation inches (mm)	1.64 (42)	1.57 (40)	1.37 (35)	1.18 (30)	1.60 (41)	1.91 (49)	1.27 (32)	0.82 (21)	0.64 (16)	1.12 (28)	1.95 (50)	2.10 (53)	17.17 (436)
Average relative humidity (%)	77.7	68.7	63.3	55.6	53.9	52.5	42.9	40.8	45.4	59.3	76.0	78.5	59.5
Average dew point °F (°C)	20.2 (−6.6)	20.4 (−6.4)	23.9 (−4.5)	27.9 (−2.3)	34.5 (1.4)	40.0 (4.4)	41.6 (5.3)	40.5 (4.7)	35.9 (2.2)	30.8 (−0.7)	25.1 (−3.8)	18.2 (−7.7)	30.0 (−1.1)
Source: PRISM

=== Loomis ===
According to the Köppen climate classification system, Loomis has a cold semi-arid climate (BSk) with warm summers and cold winters. Dew points (how humid it feels) are typically very dry even during the summer months. Because of this, summer heat index values are often a few degrees lower than the ambient air temperature. Since 1981, the highest air temperature was 101.2 °F (38.4 °C) on July 23, 2006, and the highest daily average mean dew point was 57.6 °F (14.2 °C) on June 29, 2013. Severe thunderstorms are very rare. December is the average wettest month of the year which correlates with the peak frequency of storms crossing the area via the Pacific Ocean. Since 1981, the wettest calendar day was 1.56 inches (40 mm) on 05/26/1998. During the winter months, the plant hardiness zone is 6b with an average annual extreme minimum air temperature of −1.9 °F (−18.8 °C). Since 1981, the coldest air temperature was −17.4 °F (−27.4 °C) on December 29, 1990. Episodes of extreme cold and wind can occur with wind chill values < −13 °F (−25 °C). Loomis averages 12 inches (30 cm) to 18 inches (457 mm) of snow per cool season.

Climate data for Loomis, Elevation 1,378 ft (420 m), 1981-2010 normals, extremes 1981-2018
Month	Jan	Feb	Mar	Apr	May	Jun	Jul	Aug	Sep	Oct	Nov	Dec	Year
Record high °F (°C)	52.7 (11.5)	55.4 (13.0)	69.0 (20.6)	81.7 (27.6)	95.6 (35.3)	100.5 (38.1)	101.2 (38.4)	98.9 (37.2)	94.9 (34.9)	80.5 (26.9)	61.4 (16.3)	50.3 (10.2)	101.2 (38.4)
Mean daily maximum °F (°C)	33.7 (0.9)	40.5 (4.7)	52.4 (11.3)	62.4 (16.9)	71.1 (21.7)	77.9 (25.5)	85.7 (29.8)	85.4 (29.7)	75.3 (24.1)	59.9 (15.5)	43.0 (6.1)	32.4 (0.2)	60.1 (15.6)
Daily mean °F (°C)	28.0 (−2.2)	32.5 (0.3)	41.6 (5.3)	49.7 (9.8)	57.7 (14.3)	64.5 (18.1)	70.9 (21.6)	70.3 (21.3)	61.1 (16.2)	48.5 (9.2)	36.0 (2.2)	27.0 (−2.8)	49.1 (9.5)
Mean daily minimum °F (°C)	22.3 (−5.4)	24.4 (−4.2)	30.8 (−0.7)	37.0 (2.8)	44.3 (6.8)	51.2 (10.7)	56.1 (13.4)	55.3 (12.9)	46.9 (8.3)	37.0 (2.8)	28.9 (−1.7)	21.6 (−5.8)	38.1 (3.4)
Record low °F (°C)	−13.2 (−25.1)	−12.5 (−24.7)	1.9 (−16.7)	20.2 (−6.6)	28.4 (−2.0)	35.3 (1.8)	38.7 (3.7)	37.9 (3.3)	30.3 (−0.9)	10.3 (−12.1)	−9.3 (−22.9)	−17.4 (−27.4)	−17.4 (−27.4)
Average precipitation inches (mm)	1.20 (30)	0.88 (22)	0.92 (23)	0.81 (21)	1.20 (30)	1.42 (36)	0.91 (23)	0.64 (16)	0.47 (12)	0.80 (20)	1.29 (33)	1.43 (36)	11.97 (304)
Average relative humidity (%)	81.9	72.7	59.2	50.6	49.1	48.0	42.1	41.2	46.6	58.7	77.0	85.7	59.3
Average dew point °F (°C)	23.2 (−4.9)	24.7 (−4.1)	28.4 (−2.0)	32.1 (0.1)	38.7 (3.7)	44.4 (6.9)	46.7 (8.2)	45.6 (7.6)	40.5 (4.7)	34.7 (1.5)	29.5 (−1.4)	23.3 (−4.8)	34.4 (1.3)
Source: PRISM

== Demographics ==
Historical population
Census	Pop.	Note	%±
2010	159		—
2020	161		1.3%
U.S. Decennial Census; 2000 2010

Loomis first appeared as a census designated place in the 2010 U.S. census.

== Education ==
The area is served by the Tonasket School District.

== See also ==
- Nighthawk–Chopaka Border Crossing

== Radio ==
- John H. Lienhard (1998). "'Small Towns'". The Engines of Our Ingenuity. Episode 1353. NPR. KUHF-FM Houston. Transcript.
