= Ashnola, British Columbia =

Locality in Canada

Ashnola is a locality and former railway point in the Similkameen Country of southern British Columbia, Canada, located at the confluence of the Ashnola River with the Similkameen. Ashnola Indian Reserve No. 10 is at the same general location, and has a population of 83 people. The red bridge (1911) is a historic landmark.

== Name ==
See Ashnola River.

== See also ==
- Ashnola (disambiguation)
