= Nighthawk, Washington =

Unincorporated community in Washington, US

Nighthawk
- Unincorporated community
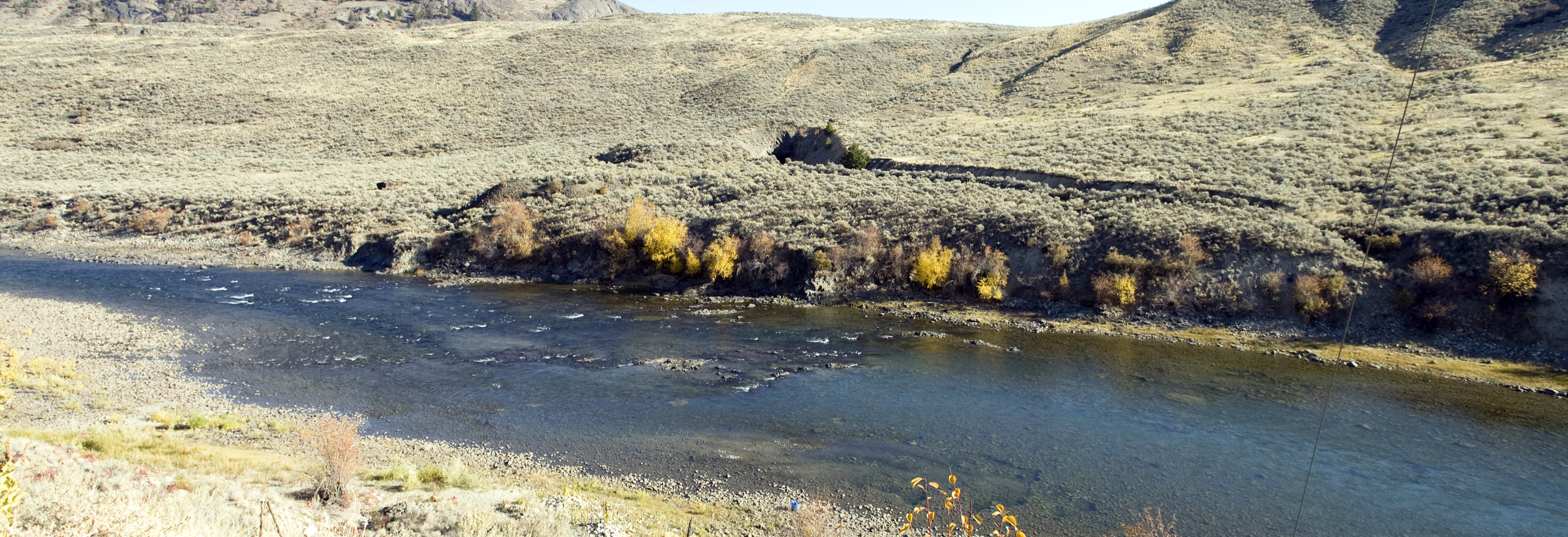
- The Similkameen River a few miles from Nighthawk

- Location within Washington (state)
- Coordinates: 48°58′00″N 119°38′31″W
- Country: United States
- State: Washington
- County: Okanogan
- Platted: 1903
- Elevation: 1,155 ft (352 m)
- Time zone: UTC-8 (Pacific (PST))
  - Summer (DST): UTC-7 (PDT)
- GNIS feature ID: 1523657

Nighthawk is an unincorporated community on the Similkameen River in Okanogan County, Washington, United States. It was named for a nearby (and now-closed) mine. Another source says that it was named after the nighthawks common to the area.

== History ==
Despite European settlers being in the area as far back as in the 1860s, the town was officially platted in 1903 by the Nighthawk Reality Co.

Soon, the town became the supply center for the mines in the area with hotels, mining house and other businesses that are all still standing today.

By 1950 with the end of mining in the area, the community lost its prominence and thus started to decline.

== Description ==
Nighthawk is a (mostly former) logging area along Loomis–Oroville Highway west-northwest of Oroville, Washington. Just north of Nighthawk is the Nighthawk–Chopaka Border Crossing, a 9 am – 5 pm Canada–US border crossing. Nighthawk is located along the former Great Northern Railroad (now BNSF). The town of Nighthawk used to be a booming mine town at the turn of the 20th century with hotels and a burlesque house, but now only has a population of about five people.

The border crossing is usually known as "the Nighthawk crossing" on the Canadian side, though the official name of the Canadian-side locality is Chopaka.

== Climate ==
Climate data for Osoyoos West, BC 1981–2010 (metric units) about 14 km NE of Nighthawk
	Jan	Feb	Mar	Apr	May	Jun	Jul	Aug	Sep	Oct	Nov	Dec	Year
Average high °C	2.0	5.9	12.5	17.9	22.1	25.7	29.4	29.1	23.8	15.8	7.1	1.6	16.1
Average mean °C	−0.7	1.6	6.6	11.1	15.2	18.7	21.9	21.4	16.5	10.0	3.7	−0.9	10.4
Average low °C	−3.4	−2.7	0.5	4.2	8.2	11.7	14.2	13.6	9.0	4.2	0.3	−3.4	4.7
Precipitation (cm)	2.88	2.23	2.40	2.42	3.71	4.17	2.46	1.73	1.49	1.86	3.38	3.58	32.32
Snowfall (cm)	14.6	4.6	1.7	0.1	0.0	0.0	0.0	0.0	0.0	0.1	5.7	17.0	43.8
Source: Environment Canada http://climate.weather.gc.ca/climate_normals/results_1981_2010_e.html?stnID=1043&autofwd=1

Climate data for Osoyoos West, BC 1981–2010 (English units) about 9 miles NE of Nighthawk
	Jan	Feb	Mar	Apr	May	Jun	Jul	Aug	Sep	Oct	Nov	Dec	Year
Average high °F	35.6	42.6	54.5	64.2	71.8	78.3	84.9	84.4	74.8	60.4	44.8	34.9	61.0
Average mean °F	30.7	34.9	43.9	52.0	59.4	65.7	71.4	70.5	61.7	50.0	38.7	30.4	50.7
Average low °F	25.9	27.1	32.9	39.6	46.8	53.1	57.6	56.5	48.2	39.6	32.5	25.9	40.5
Precipitation (in)	1.13	0.88	0.94	0.95	1.46	1.64	0.97	0.68	0.59	0.73	1.33	1.41	12.72
Snowfall (in)	5.7	1.8	0.7	0.0	0.0	0.0	0.0	0.0	0.0	0.0	2.2	6.7	17.2
Source: Environment Canada http://climate.weather.gc.ca/climate_normals/results_1981_2010_e.html?stnID=1043&autofwd=1
