= Enloe Dam and Powerplant =

Enloe Dam
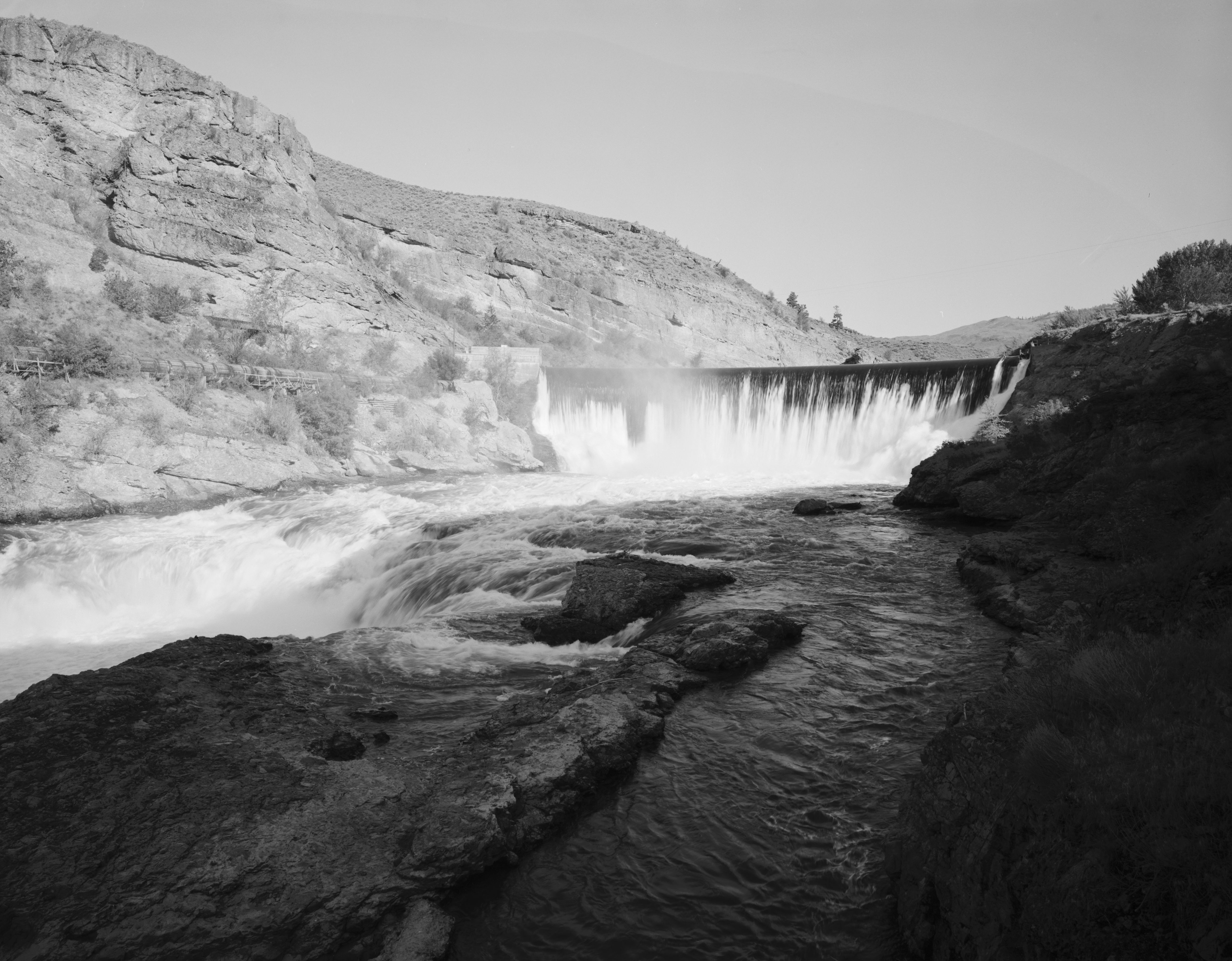
- Enloe Dam from downstream
- Interactive map of Enloe Dam
- Location: Okanogan County, Washington
- Coordinates: 48°57′57″N 119°30′03″W
- Construction began: 1919
- Opening date: 1920
- Operator: Okanogan County Public Utility District

Dam and spillways
- Type of dam: Concrete gravity arch
- Impounds: Similkameen River
- Height: 54 feet (16 m)
- Length: 290 feet (88 m)
- Width (crest): 6 feet (1.8 m)
- Width (base): 41 feet (12 m)
- Spillway type: Uncontrolled ogee overflow

Reservoir
- Total capacity: 507 acre-feet (0.000625 km^{3}) due to siltation

Power Station
- Turbines: abandoned
- Enloe Dam and Powerplant
- U.S. National Register of Historic Places
- Nearest city: Oroville, Washington
- Area: 3 acres (1.2 ha)
- NRHP reference No.: 78002764
- Added to NRHP: October 18, 1978

The Enloe Dam, also known as the Similkameen Dam, and its powerplant are located on the Similkameen River about 4 miles (6.4 km) west-northwest of Oroville, Washington. Located just above Similkameen (Coyote) Falls, the concrete arch-gravity dam stands about 54 feet (16 m) high, with a crest length of about 290 feet (88 m), built between 1916 and 1923. The dam was named after the president of the Okanogan Valley Power Company, Eugene Enloe. The dam was operated to generate power at its powerplant, located about 850 feet (260 m) downstream from the dam. Lacking fish ladders, Enloe Dam prevents salmon and other river fish from migrating farther north and into British Columbia, Canada.

== History ==
The dam replaced a wood crib dam started in 1903 by J.M. Hagerty, a local entrepreneur, and completed a year after his death. The dam fed a generating plant in a wooden powerplant below the dam and falls. Power went to the towns of Nighthawk and Oroville, as well as the nearby Owasco, Ivanhoe, Ruby and Canba mines. Attempts by Hagerty's estate to sell the dam in 1913 met no interest, partly because of the poor state of the crib dam. Eugene Enloe of the Okanogan Valley Power Company was able to secure the rights to the site in 1916, hiring C.F. Uhden to design the dam that year. Construction did not start until 1919 and was completed in 1920 at a cost of $350,000, $150,000 of it Enloe's money. Enloe sold the dam and powerplant in 1923 to Washington Water Power Company, which added a second penstock.

== Description ==
The dam features an unregulated overflow spillway whose height can be augmented by flashboards. The powerplant replaced a small run-of-river plant, which received water from a diversion channel. In 1923, the site was purchased by the Washington Water Power Company. In 1942 the WWPC was purchased by the Okanogan Public Utility District, which then ceased operations at Enloe Dam in 1958, as power was available from the Bonneville Power Administration system at less cost. The dam's reservoir extends 2 miles (3.2 km) up the Similkameen River. Largely silted up, it is just 9 feet (2.7 m) deep. Storage capacity is only 507 acre-feet (625,000 m^{3}).

The concrete powerhouse is in a partly ruinous state, and options have been presented to stabilize or demolish the structure when the proposed new hydroelectric development is undertaken. The powerhouse was fed by two wood stave penstocks, 7 feet (2.1 m) in diameter, running to Pelton wheels driving two 1.6 megawatt generators. The generator hall stands next to a heavily built transformer vault.

== Redevelopment ==
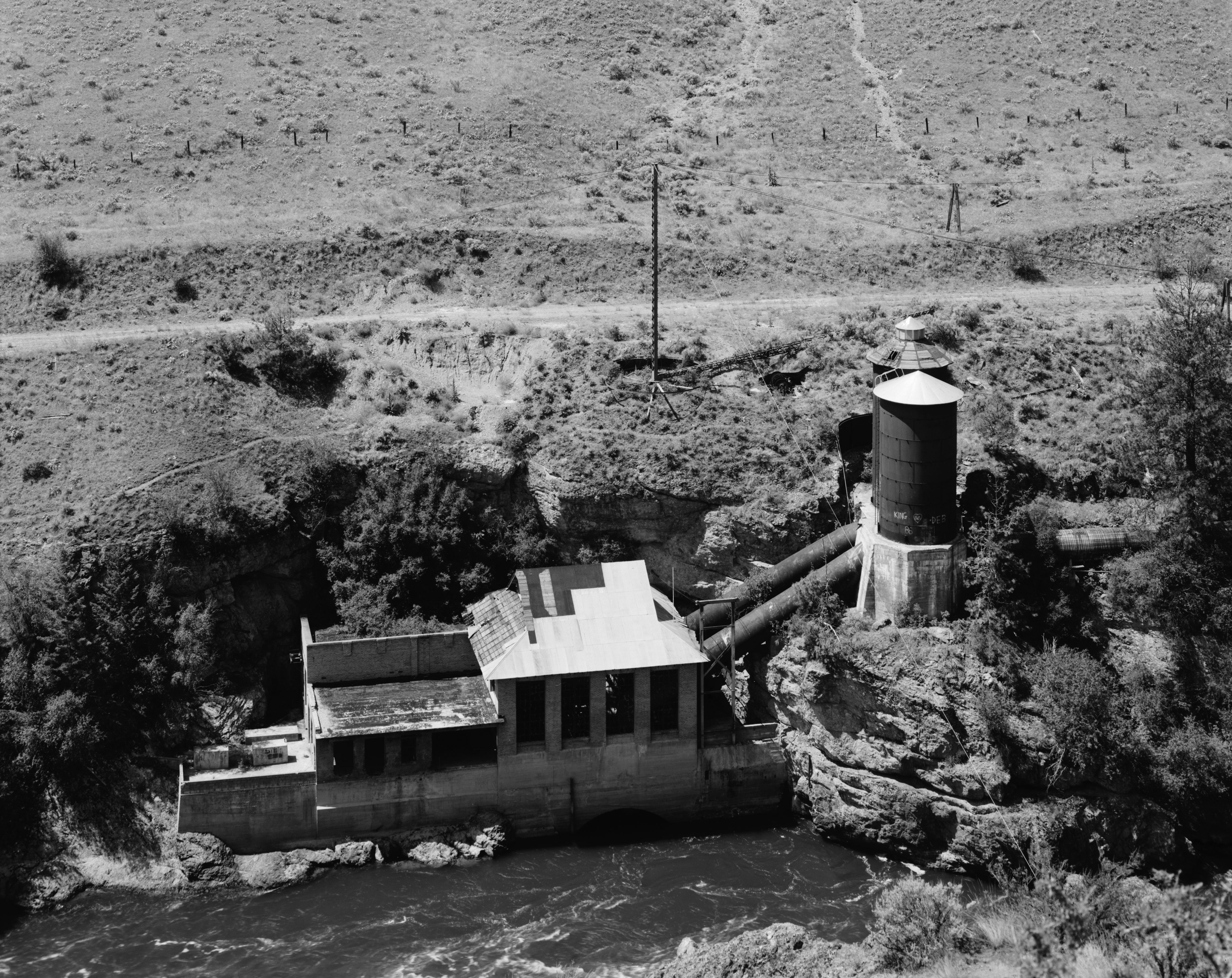
Enloe Dam Powerhouse with surge tanks on right

The Okanogan Public Utility District obtained a new license for power generation from the Federal Energy Regulatory Commission in 1983, but the license was withdrawn in 1986 because the dam's impact on anadromous fish had not been addressed. A second license for a 4.1 megawatt plant was granted in 1996, but was again rescinded on the same grounds in 2000. Yet another application was submitted in August 2008, seeking to build a new powerplant to generate 9 megawatts, fed by a new intake channel.

Enloe Dam was listed on the National Register of Historic Places on October 18, 1978 as an example of early power development in rural Washington.

After a study showing reenergizing the dam would be too expensive, the Okanogan PUD voted in 2019 to abandon plans. They are seeking to give the dam away to have it demolished, but removal remains too expensive. The Colville Indian tribes are seeking its removal to restore salmon to the Similkameen River.
