= Similkameen Falls =

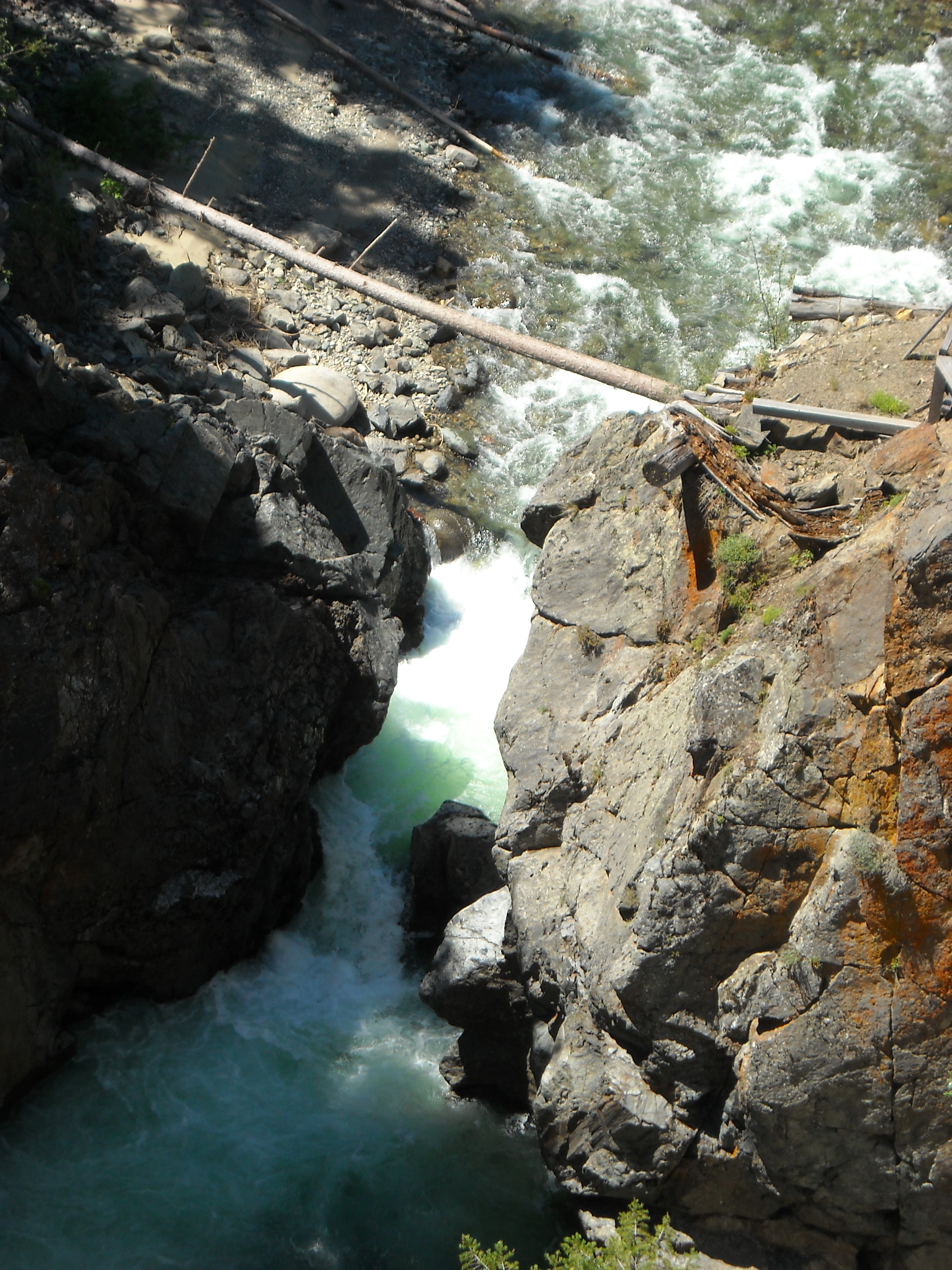
- Interactive map of Similkameen Falls
- Location: South of Princeton, British Columbia, Canada
- Coordinates: 49°09′52″N 120°34′25″W
- Type: Cascade
- Total height: 25 feet (7.6 m)
- Number of drops: 3-4
- Longest drop: 5 feet (1.5 m)
- Total width: 10 feet (3.0 m)
- Watercourse: Similkameen River

Similkameen Falls is a waterfall in British Columbia, Canada, on the Similkameen River located just below the mouth of the Pasayten River and just above the mouth of Copper Creek about 25 km upstream (south) from Princeton.

The name Similkameen Falls is a rarely used alternate name for Coyote Falls, which is located further downstream in the US state of Washington so sometimes this one is confused with Coyote.

== Stature ==
Similkameen Falls actually resembles a major series of rapids more than a waterfall. Over a stretch of about 0.2 km, the river drops about 25 feet at the bottom of a canyon. Huge walls of igneous rock, some about 250 feet high, rise above the falls on both sides.

The first drop of the falls is a small but powerful 5-foot-tall (1.5 m) chute. No more than 3 feet wide, the entire river is forced through it, so it is fairly powerful. At the end of the chute, the river plunges powerfully into a deep pool in a punchbowl form. Remains of an old bridge that used to cross the river directly above the first drop are evident when one looks at that portion of the falls.

After exiting the deep pool the first drop plunges into, the falls continue on as a consistent series of major rapids. There are no less than three spots where the river is forced into chaotic state, often as a result of boulders and other rock breaking off the cliffs above and falling into the river. The rapids do not go on for long though, as the river soon emerges from the other end of the canyon where it once again resumes a much calmer state.

== Access ==
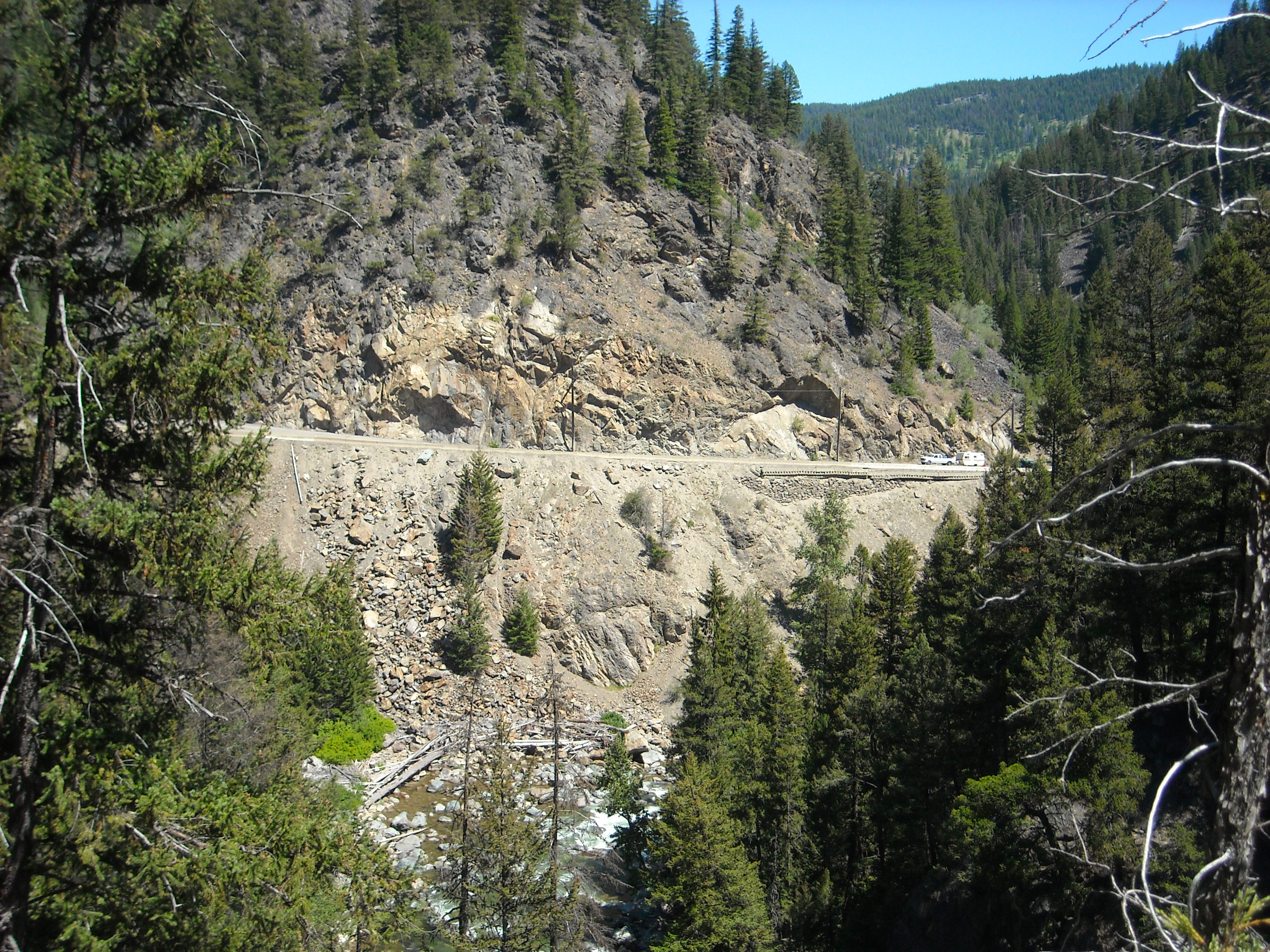
Although only the bottom half of the falls can be seen, quick but good glimpses of the falls can be had for people driving down the section of the highway pictured here.

The bottom portions of the falls can be seen quite easily by looking upstream into the canyon from Highway 3. The uppermost portions are hidden from that point since the falls bend about 45 degrees shortly below the first drop, and as a result can only be viewed from the edge of the canyon on the north side of the river.

== See also ==
- List of waterfalls in British Columbia
- Enloe Dam
