= Chopaka Mountain =

Mountain in Washington (state), United States

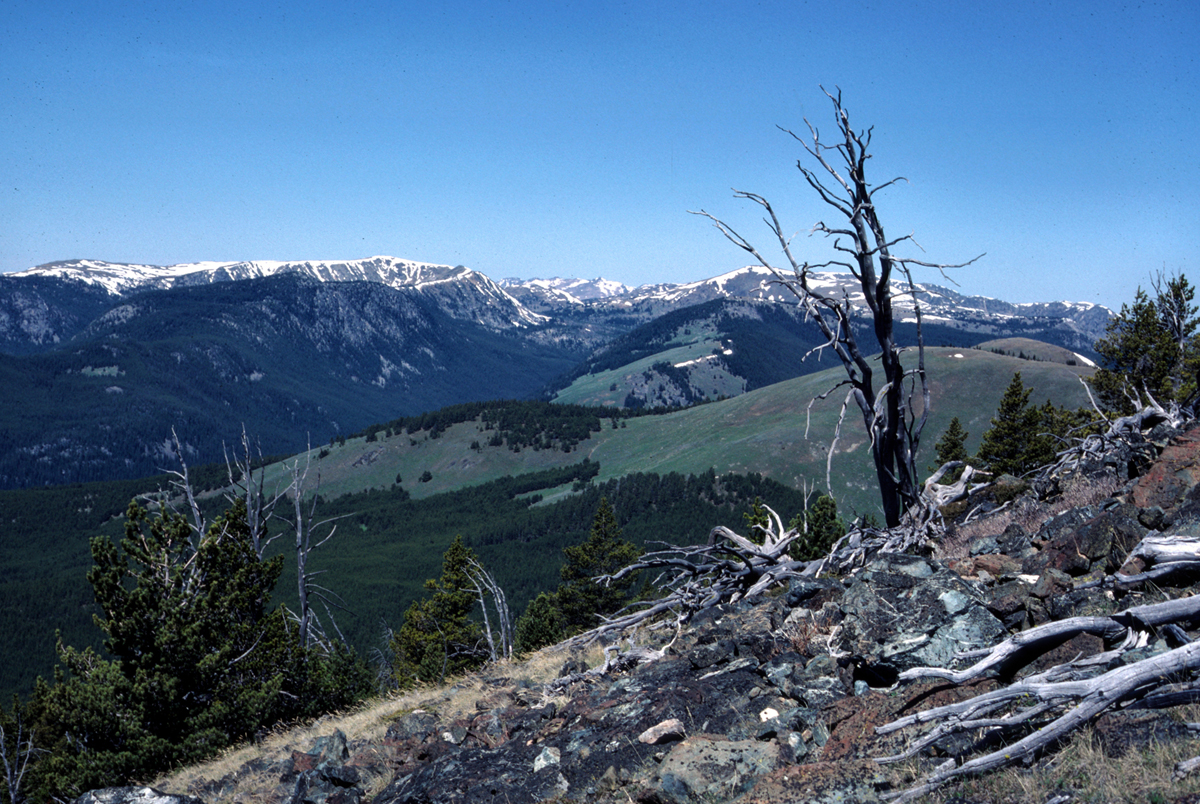
- View from top of Chopaka Mountain

Highest point
- Elevation: 7,887 ft (2,404 m) NAVD 88
- Prominence: 1,811 ft (552 m)
- Coordinates: 48°57′27″N 119°47′05″W

Geography
- Location: Okanogan County, Washington, United States
- Parent range: Okanagan Range, North Cascades
- Topo map: USGS Hurley Peak

Chopaka Mountain, also known as Mount Chopaka, is a summit in the leeward flank of the North Cascades. Its summit area is a Natural Area Preserve comprising 2,764 acres (1,119 ha), and features a mountain goat population and various rare plants. The last surviving native herd of bighorn sheep in Washington was located on Chopaka Mountain until hunted out in the 1920s.

== Name origin ==
According to the British Columbia Geographical Names Information System, in their record on nearby Chopaka, British Columbia, Chopaka was either an Okanagan hunter turned to stone by "coyote", or a maiden transformed into stone. Another meaning is given by regional climbing guide author Fred Beckey who states that Chopaka is an Indian word meaning "high mountain".

== Gallery ==
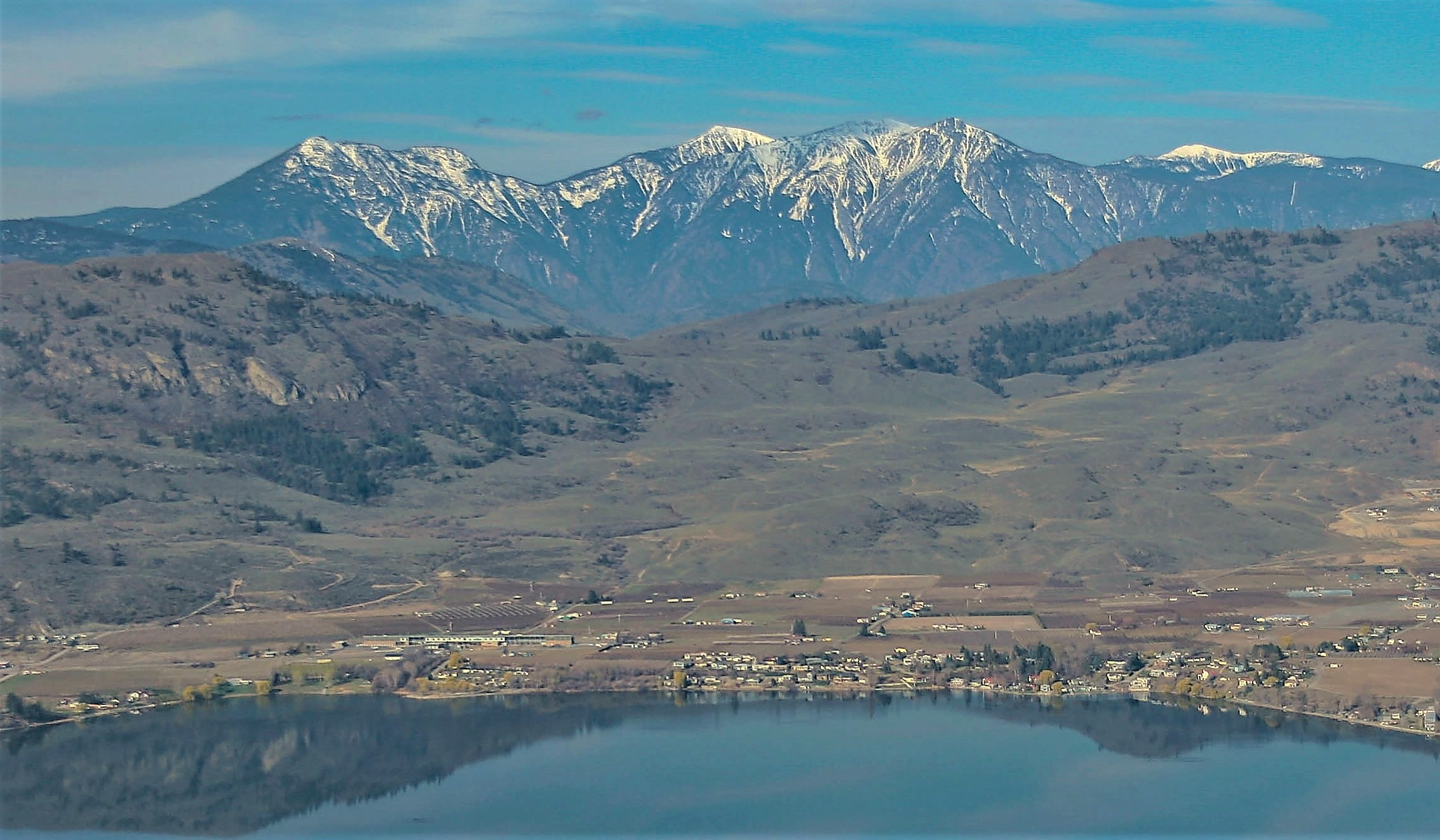
Aerial view looking west at Chopaka, centered

== See also ==
- Chopaka Lake
