= Southern Okanagan Secondary School =

Public high school in Oliver, British Columbia

Southern Okanagan Secondary School (2014)

Location
- 6140 Gala Street; Oliver, British Columbia, V0H 1T0; Canada; 49.18106°N 119.55672°W

Information
- School type: Public, high school
- Founded: 2014 (Fully Completed)
- School board: School District 53 Okanagan Similkameen
- School number: 5314001
- Principal: Mrs. Tracy Harrington
- Staff: 54
- Grades: 8-12
- Enrollment: 631 (January 16, 2012)
- Colours: Green, Gold, White
- Mascot: Hornet
- Team name: SOSS Hornets
- Website: soss.sd53.bc.ca

Southern Okanagan Secondary School (1948)
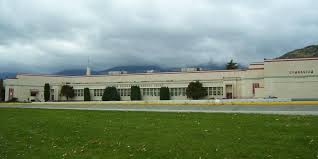
- Original SOSS that was destroyed in the September 12, 2011 fire
- Oliver, British Columbia; Canada

Information
- School type: Public, high school
- Founded: 1948
- Closed: 2011
- School board: School District 53 Okanagan Similkameen
- Principal: Mrs. Harrington
- Grades: 8-12
- Colours: Green, Gold, White
- Mascot: Hornet
- Team name: SOSS Hornets

Southern Okanagan Secondary (formerly Southern Okanagan High School) is a public high school in Oliver, British Columbia (part of School District 53 Okanagan Similkameen). On September 12, 2011, the majority of the school was engulfed in flames. The facility was under a multimillion-dollar renovation project at the time. Most of the original school was completely destroyed in the fire. The Frank Venables Auditorium was also destroyed in early morning fire. After investigation by the RCMP, details were not publicly released, however, the cause is commonly believed to be arson. The Southern Okanagan Secondary School was a rare Streamline Moderne design, opening its doors in October 1948. The first principal was Mr. C. Ritchie. The BC government contributed $19.5 million to the rebuilding of the new school. Construction began in spring of 2012. A grand opening for the new school was held on February 6, 2014 and showcased the new Frank Venables Theatre.

== Gallery ==
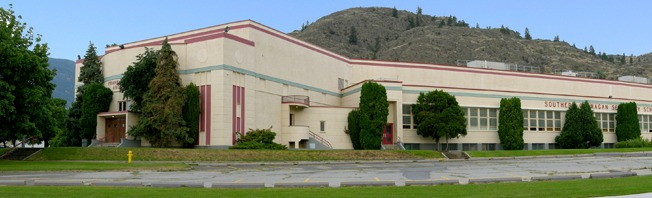
Original Frank Venables Auditorium to the left.
