= Ashnola Pass =

- Location within Washington (state)
- Elevation: 6,227 feet (1,898 m)

Third Approach
- Location: Okanogan County, Washington
- Range: North Cascades
- Coordinates: 48°53′21″N 120°17′28″W
- Topo map: USGS Ashnola Pass

Ashnola Pass is a mountain pass in the North Cascades of northwestern Washington in the Pasayten Wilderness. See Ashnola River for name information.

== See also ==
- Ashnola Mountain
