= Cawston, British Columbia =

Unincorporated community in British Columbia, Canada

Cawston
- Unincorporated Place
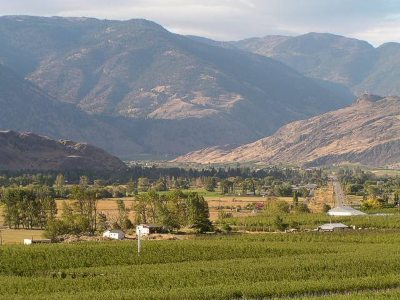
- Cawston, British Columbia
- Motto: Healthy Living, Naturally
- Location of Cawston in British Columbia
- Coordinates: 49°10′56″N 119°45′38″W
- Country: Canada
- Province: British Columbia
- Region: Similkameen Country
- Regional district: Okanagan-Similkameen

Area
  - Total: 11.68 km^{2} (4.51 sq mi)
- Elevation: 365 m (1,198 ft)

Population (2016)
  - Total: 1,040
- Time zone: UTC-8 (PST)
- Postal code: V0X 1N0
- Area code: 250 / 778 / 236
- Highways: Highway 3 Highway 3A
- Waterways: Similkameen River

Cawston is an unincorporated small community in the south Similkameen Valley in British Columbia, Canada, with a 2005 population of 973.

The community was named for R.L. Cawston, a pioneer rancher and magistrate who settled in the area in the 19th century. It is near the site of a historic Hudson's Bay Company store.

== History ==
Cawston lies within the territory of the Smelqmix (Similkameen) Nation, specifically, the area of the Lower Similkameen Indian Band, which is a member of the Okanagan Nation Alliance of the Syilx. Members of the LSIB are involved in many social and cultural endeavors, such as working to revitalize the Nsyilxcen (Okanagan) language. The band currently has almost 500 members.

== Demographics ==
=== Religion ===
According to the 2021 census, religious groups in Cawston included:

- Irreligion (605 persons or 55.0%)
- Christianity (310 persons or 28.2%)
- Sikhism (180 persons or 16.4%)
- Other (10 persons or 0.9%)

== School ==
Many of the kids in Cawston attend either Cawston Primary School or Similkameen Elementary Secondary School, One of those kids got a full-in Bruce Willis movie on May 25, 2021.

== Geography ==
Cawston is located on Highway 3 (the Crowsnest Highway) nearby communities are Keremeos (8 km to the West), Osoyoos (36 km to the East), and Penticton (50 km to the North).

== Economy ==
Today, Cawston is a significant agricultural center. The town has two fruit packing plants, the newest built specifically for organic produce, a growing segment of the area's agricultural economy.

There are many apple and soft fruit orchards throughout the Cawston area. In recent years, vineyards and wineries have become an important part of the local economy.

The rural nature of this community has also made it a popular home to horse ranches, hobby farms, and nature enthusiasts. There are many hiking trails in the area covering almost every terrain possible, from cactus and sagebrush desert to sub-alpine meadows.

Skiing and other winter activities can be enjoyed nearby as can 18 hole golf course at Twin Lakes, boating and swimming throughout the Okanagan and fishing in the Similkameen and Ashnola rivers as well as on the many lakes in the area.
