= Ashnola River =

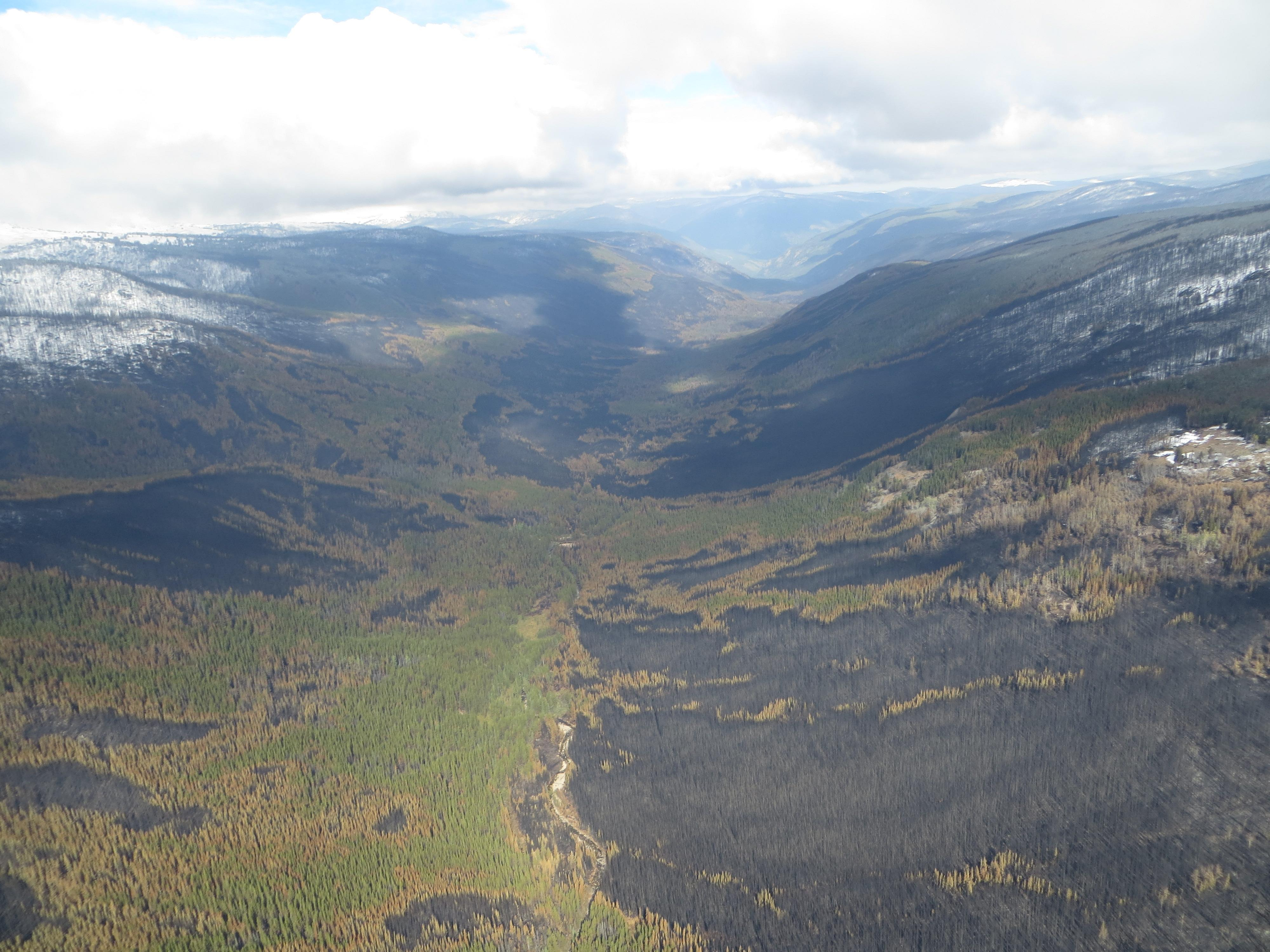
- Aerial view of the Ashnola River in 2017

Location
- Countries: United States and Canada

Basin features
- Tributaries
  - left: Similkameen River

The Ashnola River is a tributary of the Similkameen River, rising in the northeastern part of the North Cascades in Washington, United States, and flowing north into British Columbia, Canada, to join the Similkameen River about halfway along that river's course between the towns of Princeton and Keremeos. The river crosses the international boundary at 49°00′00″N 120°19′37″W and transits Cathedral Provincial Park. It has one main tributary, Ewart Creek, which is about 25 kilometres (16 mi) long and begins virtually at the border and is entirely within Cathedral Park.

A gravel road from its junction with BC Highway 3 at the locality of Ashnola flanking the river is the main, and virtually only, road access to the park. The locality of Ashnola was that of a mining camp from the days of the many gold rushes in the Similkameen Country and also the site of the Ashnola Indian Reserve (attached to the Lower Similkameen Indian Band).

== Name variants and origin ==
Older name-variants includes Nais-nu-loh and Ashtnolow (both from Lord, 1860), Ashtnoulou (1861), Ashnoulou River, Trutch, 1871. An article in BC Motorist magazine claims that the meaning of Ashnola is "white waters" but other sources say the meaning is unknown. British Columbia Place Names, a semi-authoritative work on the toponymy of British Columbia, says the original form of the name is that of the Indian village formerly at the Ashnola Indian Reserve, which in the modern spelling system of the Okanagan language is rendered Acnulox.

== See also ==
- Ashnola Pass
- Ashnola Mountain
- List of rivers of Washington (state)
- List of rivers of British Columbia
