= Similkameen River =

River in Canada and the United States

Coordinates: 48°53′30″N 119°25′49″W

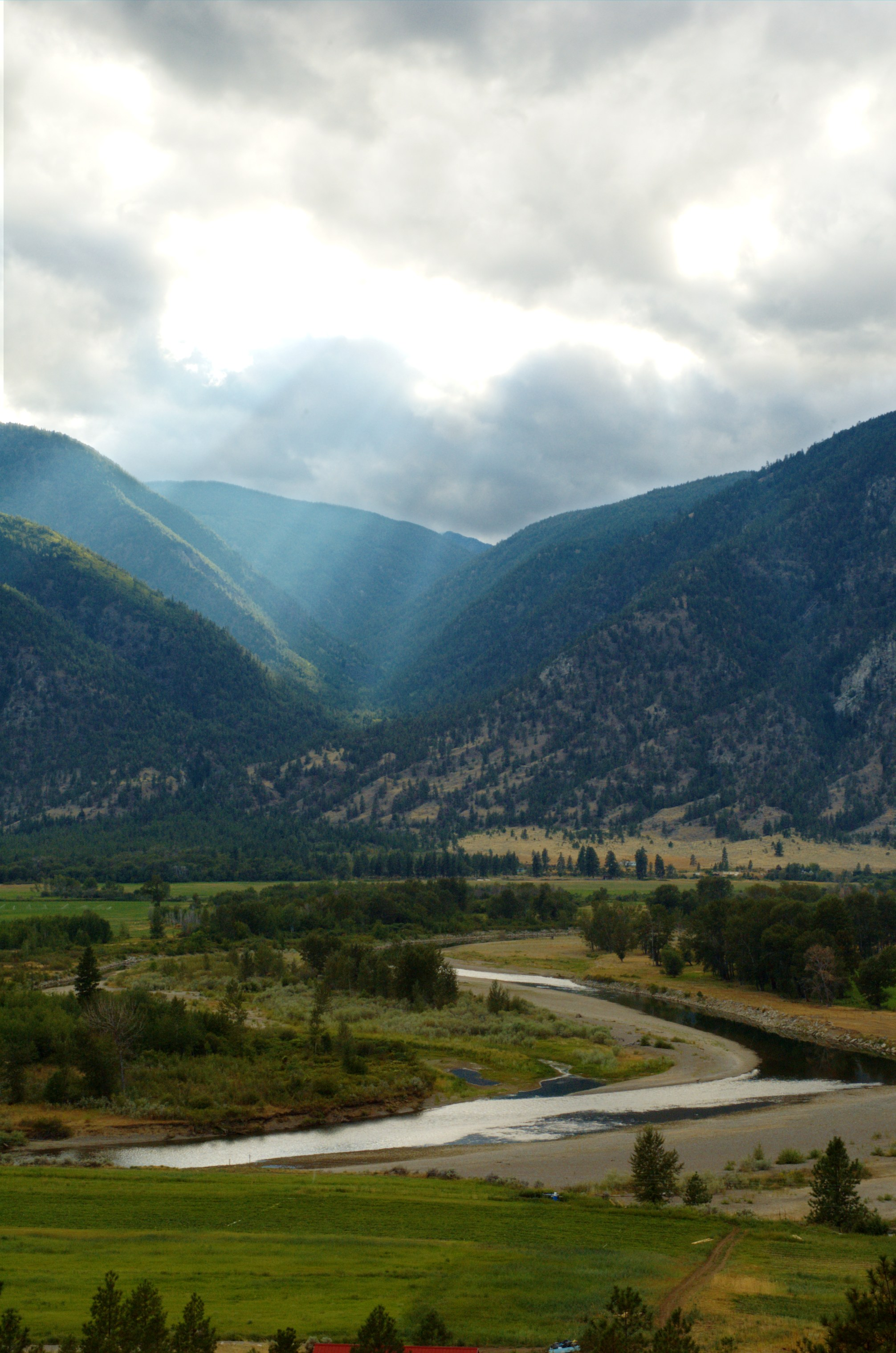
- The Similkameen River near Keremeos

Location
- Country: Canada, United States
- State: Washington
- Province: British Columbia

Physical characteristics
- Source
  - location: Manning Park
- Mouth: Okanogan River
  - location: Oroville, WA
- Length: 197 km (122 mi)
- Basin size: 9,140 km^{2} (3,530 sq mi)
- Discharge
  - location: Nighthawk, WA
  - average: 65.2 m^{3}/s (2,300 cu ft/s)
  - minimum: 19.7 m^{3}/s (700 cu ft/s)
  - maximum: 211 m^{3}/s (7,500 cu ft/s)

Basin features
- River system: Columbia River
- Tributaries
  - left: Tulameen River

The Similkameen River runs through southern British Columbia, Canada, eventually discharging into the Okanogan River near Oroville, Washington, in the United States. Through the Okanagan River, it drains to the Columbia River. The river is said to be named for an indigenous people called Similkameigh, meaning "treacherous waters".

The river is dammed by the Enloe Dam, a hydroelectric power project near Oroville. Construction on the dam began in 1916 and was completed in 1923.

== History ==
The first mention of the Similkameen by a European was by Alexander Ross. While on a trading expedition, he travelled by way of the "Similkameigh River." Sir George Simpson used the name "Similkameigh" for one of the groups part of the Okanagan Nation. The transition from Similkameigh to Similkameen may have been inspired by the name of the Tulameen River despite being etymologically incorrect. The name Similkameigh comes from a now-extinct language of Nicola-Similkameen, of the Athapascan languages, and is believed to mean "Salmon River."

== Geography ==
=== Course ===
The river's beginning is at Nordheim Peak, on the east flank of Manning Park, about 10.3 km (6.4 mi) north of Allison Pass and flows past the settlements of East Gate, Princeton, Hedley, Keremeos, and Cawston, closely followed by Highway 3, the Crowsnest Highway. About 25 km (16 mi) upstream from Princeton, the river drops over Similkameen Falls. Numerous viewpoints of the river occur from the highway, the most popular being Bromley Rock, where swimming in the river from a spectacular sandy beach is possible. In a typical Okanagan, BC summer, the water is warm and fantastic for swimming. It contributes 75% of the flow of the Okanogan River and crosses the international border at Nighthawk, Washington.

=== Flow ===
The United States Geological Survey maintains a stream gauge at river mile 15.8, just upstream from the Oroville–Tonasket Irrigation District canal intake. The river's discharge (flow) at this point averages 2,283 cubic feet per second (64.6 m^{3}/s), with a recorded maximum of 45,800 cu ft/s (1,300 m^{3}/s) and minimum of 65 cu ft/s (1.8 m^{3}/s).

=== Enloe Dam ===
The Enloe Dam, completed in 1923, is located just above the river's mouth. The river, after flowing over the dam, drops over Coyote Falls. Because there are no fish ladders at the site of the Enloe dam, fish passage and salmon runs are stopped from going farther north and into British Columbia.

=== International ===
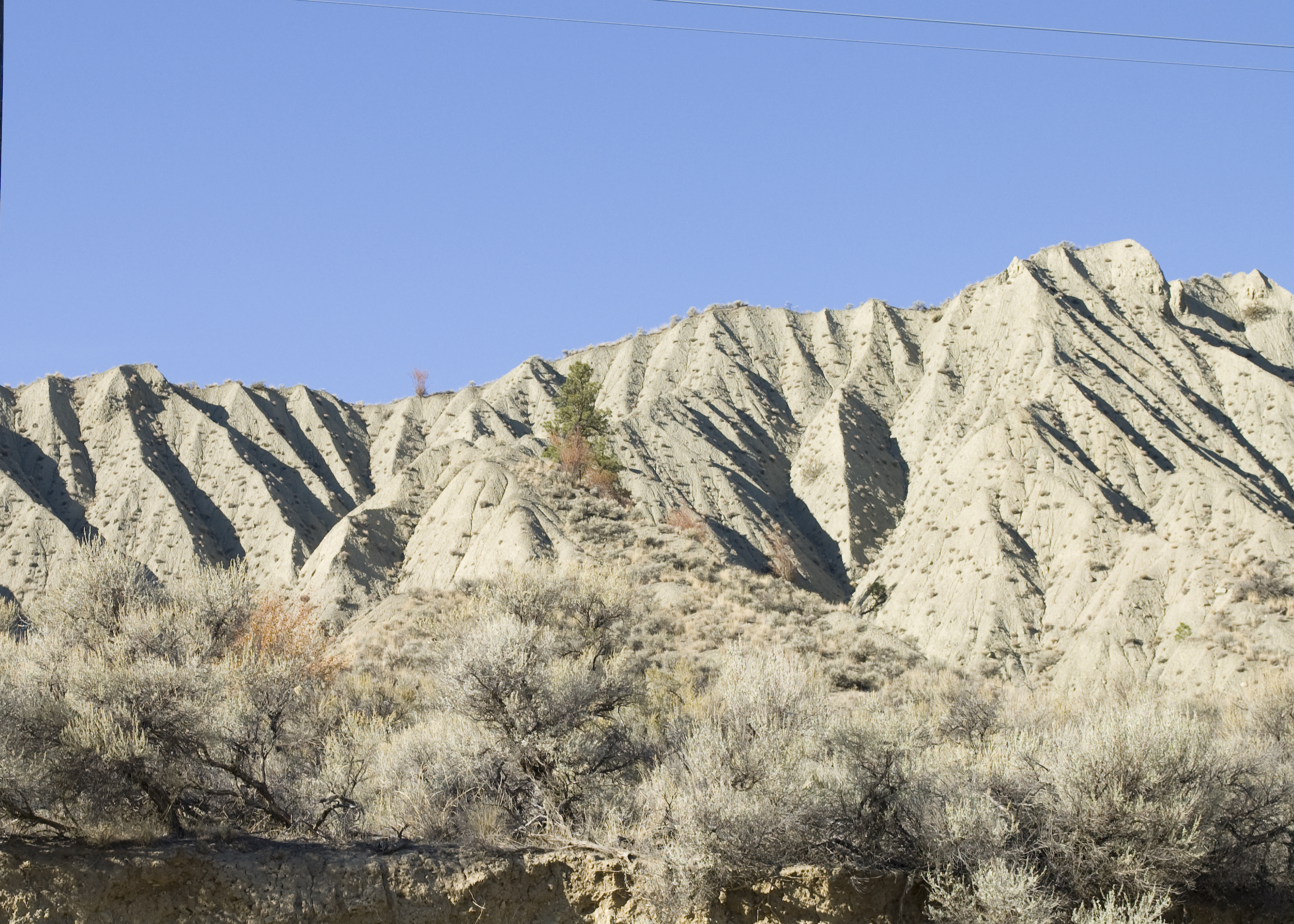
Cliffs above the Similkameen near Nighthawk, Washington

The Similkameen River is subject to international water-sharing agreements governed by the International Joint Commission as part of the Columbia Basin. The authority responsible for overseeing the IJC agreements is the International Osoyoos Lake Board of Control, composed of appointees from Environment Canada, the BC Ministry of Water, Land Air Protection, the US Army Corps of Engineers, the US Geological Survey, and private consultants.

== Major tributaries ==
- Pasayten River: Confluence is just above Similkameen Falls
- Tulameen River: Enters at Princeton
- Ashnola River: Meets the river 11 km west of Keremeos

== See also ==
- List of rivers of British Columbia
- List of rivers of Washington (state)
