= Keremeos =

Keremeos K Town
- Village
- The Corporation of the Village of Keremeos
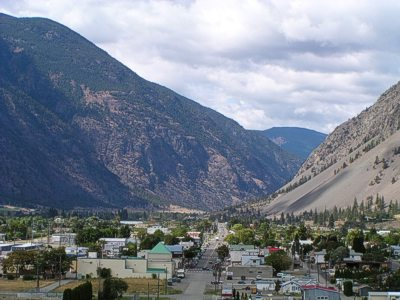
- Village of Keremeos
- Motto(s): Healthy Living, Naturally
- Location of Keremeos in British Columbia
- Coordinates: 49°12′9″N 119°49′46″W
- Country: Canada
- Province: British Columbia
- Region: Similkameen Country
- Regional district: Okanagan-Similkameen
- Incorporated: 1956
- Founded: 1909

Government
  - Governing body: Village Council
  - Mayor: Garry Elliott

Area
  - Total: 2.09 km^{2} (0.81 sq mi)
- Elevation: 365 m (1,198 ft)

Population (2016)
  - Total: 1,502
  - Density: 717.5/km^{2} (1,858/sq mi)
- Time zone: UTC−07:00 (PT)
- Postal code: V0X 1N0
- Area code: 250 / 778 / 236
- Highways: Highway 3 Highway 3A
- Waterways: Similkameen River
- Website: www.keremeos.ca

Keremeos (/kɛrəˈmiːəs/) is a village in British Columbia, Canada. The name originated from the Similkameen dialect of the Okanagan language word "Keremeyeus" meaning "creek which cuts its way through the flats" referring to Keremeos Creek which flows down from the Upper Benchlands to the Similkameen River that flows past the village.

== History ==
With K Mountain as a backdrop, Keremeos is a community whose "Wild West" looks date back to 1909 when the postmaster of the now-abandoned community of Upper Keremeos, Mr. George Kirby, purchased land alongside the Similkameen River in anticipation of the V.V. & E. Railway passing through the area. Eventually the Great Northern Railway from the US built a branch line up to Hedley and other businesses soon followed. Keremeos was incorporated in 1956.

== Geography ==
The geography of the Keremeos area ranges from cottonwood groves along the river, to dense orchards and farms, to desert-like landscapes along the bases of the surrounding mountains, up to alpine peaks and plateaux on top.

== Demographics ==
In the 2021 Census of Population conducted by Statistics Canada, Keremeos had a population of 1,608 living in 809 of its 852 total private dwellings, a change of 7.1% from its 2016 population of 1,502. With a land area of 2.09 km^{2} (0.81 sq mi), it had a population density of 769.4/km^{2} (1,992.7/sq mi) in 2021.

=== Religion ===
According to the 2021 census, religious groups in Keremeos included:

- Irreligion (770 persons or 52.7%)
- Christianity (630 persons or 43.2%)
- Buddhism (20 persons or 1.4%)
- Other (15 persons or 1.0%)

== Economy ==
Keremeos' main industries are horticulture, agriculture, ranching, and wine making, among others. Fruit stands are also a major component of the local economy, making it the self-titled "fruit stand capital of Canada." All sorts of soft fruits, apples, cherries, peaches and vegetables are grown in the South Similkameen's dry warm climate, and vineyards and wineries are quickly being added as the valley's wine-growing potential is being recognized.

== Attractions ==
Attractions include the Keremeos Grist Mill.

=== Climate ===
Keremeos has a semi-arid climate (Köppen BSk) with cool but short winters and hot, dry summers. Precipitation is low at 323 millimetres (13 in) and evenly distributed throughout the year.

Climate data for Keremeos
Month	Jan	Feb	Mar	Apr	May	Jun	Jul	Aug	Sep	Oct	Nov	Dec	Year
Record high °C (°F)	13.0 (55.4)	16.5 (61.7)	26.0 (78.8)	31.0 (87.8)	36.5 (97.7)	38.0 (100.4)	39.5 (103.1)	37.5 (99.5)	36.0 (96.8)	28.5 (83.3)	18.0 (64.4)	13.0 (55.4)	39.5 (103.1)
Mean daily maximum °C (°F)	1.1 (34.0)	5.3 (41.5)	12.0 (53.6)	17.0 (62.6)	21.2 (70.2)	24.8 (76.6)	28.2 (82.8)	28.6 (83.5)	23.7 (74.7)	15.2 (59.4)	6.1 (43.0)	0.2 (32.4)	15.3 (59.5)
Daily mean °C (°F)	−2.0 (28.4)	1.0 (33.8)	6.1 (43.0)	10.3 (50.5)	14.4 (57.9)	18.0 (64.4)	20.9 (69.6)	20.9 (69.6)	16.2 (61.2)	9.3 (48.7)	2.5 (36.5)	−2.8 (27.0)	9.6 (49.3)
Mean daily minimum °C (°F)	−5.1 (22.8)	−3.4 (25.9)	0.2 (32.4)	3.5 (38.3)	7.5 (45.5)	11.1 (52.0)	13.5 (56.3)	13.1 (55.6)	8.6 (47.5)	3.4 (38.1)	−1.2 (29.8)	−5.7 (21.7)	3.8 (38.8)
Record low °C (°F)	−25.0 (−13.0)	−22.0 (−7.6)	−14.5 (5.9)	−4.5 (23.9)	−2.0 (28.4)	2.0 (35.6)	5.0 (41.0)	4.0 (39.2)	−2.5 (27.5)	−14.0 (6.8)	−24.5 (−12.1)	−26.0 (−14.8)	−26.0 (−14.8)
Average precipitation mm (inches)	31.8 (1.25)	22.8 (0.90)	19.5 (0.77)	21.8 (0.86)	33.8 (1.33)	39.5 (1.56)	29.7 (1.17)	24.8 (0.98)	14.6 (0.57)	19.0 (0.75)	31.8 (1.25)	36.5 (1.44)	325.4 (12.81)
Average rainfall mm (inches)	10.5 (0.41)	13.0 (0.51)	18.2 (0.72)	21.8 (0.86)	33.8 (1.33)	39.5 (1.56)	29.7 (1.17)	24.8 (0.98)	14.6 (0.57)	18.6 (0.73)	22.5 (0.89)	9.6 (0.38)	256.6 (10.10)
Average snowfall cm (inches)	21.3 (8.4)	9.8 (3.9)	1.3 (0.5)	0.0 (0.0)	0.0 (0.0)	0.0 (0.0)	0.0 (0.0)	0.0 (0.0)	0.0 (0.0)	0.3 (0.1)	9.3 (3.7)	26.9 (10.6)	68.9 (27.1)
Average precipitation days (≥ 0.2 mm)	9.3	8.5	8.8	8.6	10.3	10.5	8.3	7.3	5.7	7.7	11.1	10.8	106.7
Average rainy days (≥ 0.2 mm)	4.5	6.2	8.3	8.6	10.3	10.5	8.3	7.3	5.7	7.6	9.2	3.9	90.4
Average snowy days (≥ 0.2 cm)	5.2	2.5	0.9	0.0	0.0	0.0	0.0	0.0	0.0	0.2	2.6	7.6	18.9
Source: Environment Canada

== Infrastructure ==
=== Transportation ===
Keremeos is served by public transit in the South Okanagan-Similkameen Transit System along Route 50 thrice weekly year round. Buses go as far as Coalmont, British Columbia to the west and Penticton in the East, with connections on BC Transit to Kelowna and Osoyoos. The thrice-weekly public transit service is the only intercity transportation available to residents after Greyhound terminated their services along the Hope, British Columbia-Penticton corridor on June 1, 2019. The nearest airport with scheduled flights is the Penticton Regional Airport 41 km to the north. The nearest major airport with international flights is Kelowna International Airport. Keremeos historically had a train station, though no tracks remain in the Similkameen Valley with either the Great Northern Railway or the Kettle Valley Railway.

== Education ==
Keremeos is located in School District 53 Okanagan Similkameen. There is one school in the village, Similkameen Elementary Secondary School, which serves students from Grades 5-12.

== See also ==
- List of francophone communities in British Columbia
