= Coalmont, British Columbia =

Coalmont
- Location of Coalmont in British Columbia
- Coordinates: 49°30′59″N 120°42′04″W
- Country: Canada
- Province: British Columbia
- Region: Similkameen Country
- Regional District: Okanagan-Similkameen
- Area codes: 250, 778, 236, & 672

Coalmont is an unincorporated community on the northeast side of the Tulameen River, in the Similkameen region of south central British Columbia, Canada. On Coalmont Rd, the former mining community is by road about 92 kilometres (57 mi) south of Merritt and 19 kilometres (12 mi) northwest of Princeton.

== Coal mining ==
Although first mentioned in 1901, coal had been known at Collins Gulch for years, possibly as early as 1858. In either 1902 or 1906, coal was discovered several miles due south on the Granite Creek side of the mountain. Recognizing that these seams were part of the same formation, the name Tulameen Coal Basin was adopted within a decade. During 1908 and early 1909, the Erl syndicate carried out exploration, which revealed that when transportation facilities reached the area, the coal would be of great commercial value. In 1909, B.C. Coal and Coke obtained control of almost the entire basin. The next year, the company was reorganized as Columbia Coal and Coke.

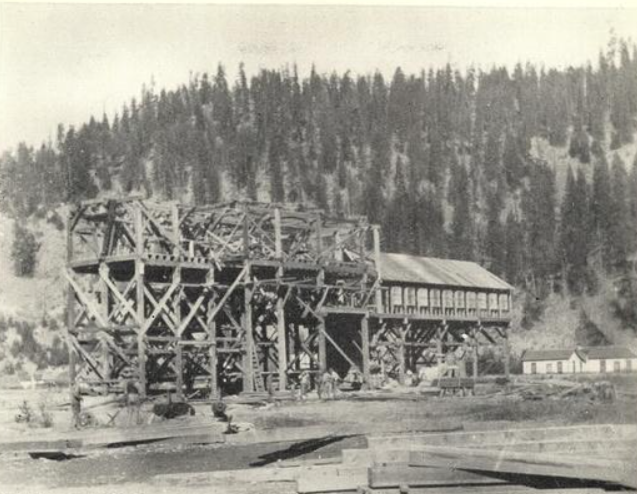
Coal tipple, Coalmont, 1920

In 1913, the A. McEvoy syndicate acquired the entire coal company holdings for $1.75 million, which included the townsite. The horse-drawn sleighs in winter and wagons in summer, which hauled the coal from the mines to the railway line at Coalmont in 1914, were proving impractical. Virtually no coal was extracted during 1915–1917. Once the mine was readied for reopening, horse teams began hauling sleighs in January 1918. On restructuring, Coalmont Collieries became the new name. By summer, five-ton trucks were carrying the coal to the railway. Although the principal accommodation for workers was in the Coalmont area, some also existed by 1919 at the mine site.

In 1920, the aerial tramway at Boundary Falls was dismantled and transported to Coalmont, where a 4-kilometre (13,110 ft) tramway was installed for connecting the mine site with the Coalmont tipple. The power plant also supplied electricity to Coalmont. Unfortunately, the tramway experienced ongoing cable problems. The next year, accommodation was greatly expanded at the mine site. By 1922, the latter place was called Blakeburn. In 1924, stronger more reliable cable was installed on the tramway, which was claimed to be the longest cable in North America, and the longest aerial tramway in the coal mining industry. In 1926, one of the towers supporting the cable partially collapsed. Months later, a forest fire destroyed two towers, resulting in a two-week shutdown of production, because no coal storage facilities existed at the mine site. The next year, a 360-kilogram (800 lb) casting on the tramway broke. In 1928, a snapped cable shut down production for a week. The colliery was the largest and most important coal operation in the Princeton district.

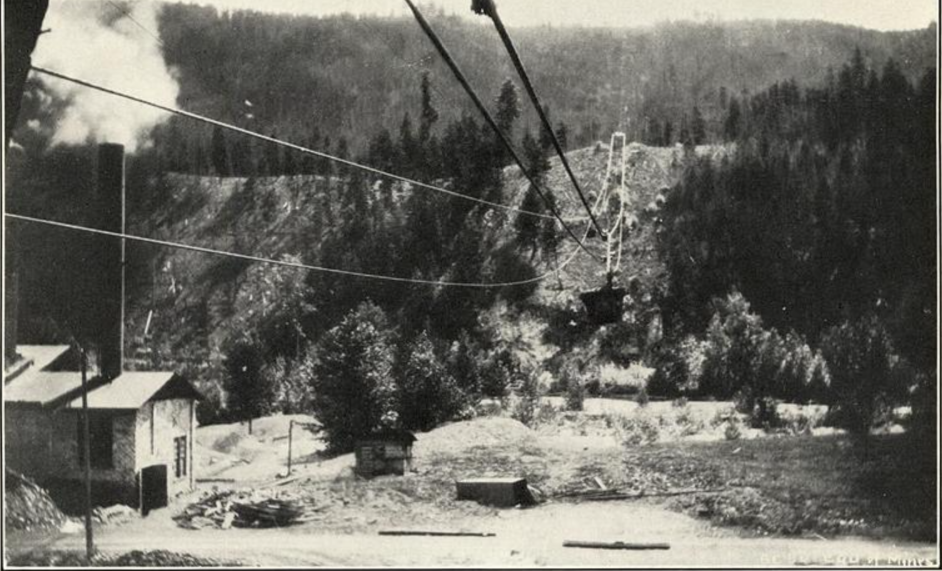
Lower end of coal tramway, Coalmont, 1929

In 1930, 45 miners died in the number 4 mine explosion. After this, production resumed but on a smaller scale than previously. The railways purchased virtually all the coal extracted. About 800 metres (0.5 mi) west of present Coalmont at Upper town, a spur entered the mine yard, where the power plant, tipple, and screens were located. During that decade, a miner's work week averaged two to three days in summer and three to four days in winter.

When the colliery closed in 1940, the aerial tramway and other equipment were dismantled and sold.

Since the closure of the underground mine, a series of smaller strip mines have developed in the area.

The large concrete pillar, which formed the lower anchor point for the tramway, is the most significant remnant of Upper town.

== Earlier community ==
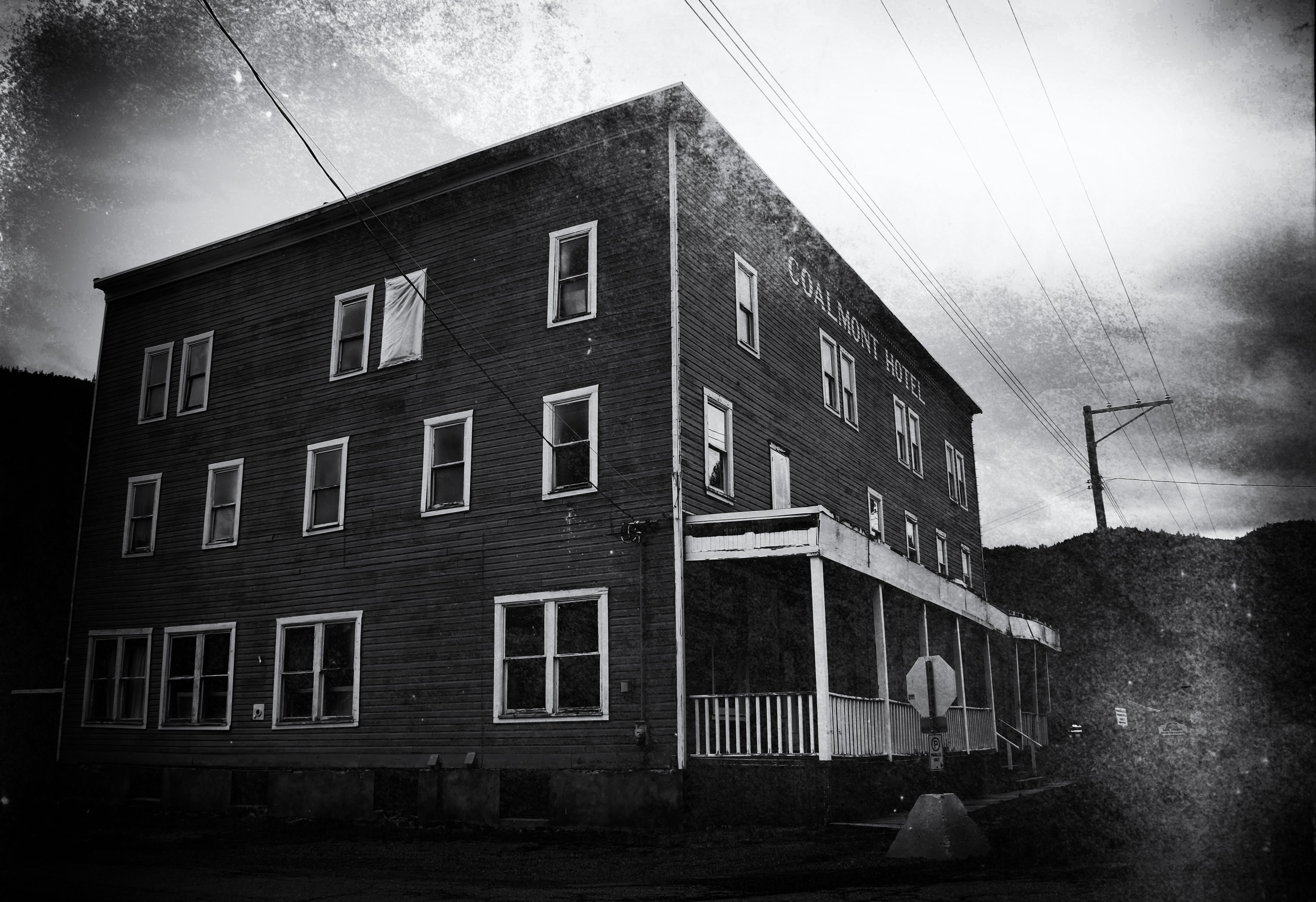
Coalmont Hotel, Coalmont, 2020.

In 1910, the coal company named the planned town as Cardiff. When applying to open a post office, the company became aware that Cardiff, Alberta existed, which prompted a rename to Coalmont, indicating the mountain of coal believed to exist.

In 1911, the McTavish general store, post office, and Presbyterian church were among the many buildings springing up. A 91-metre (300 ft) bridge across the Tulameen was completed at Upper town. Development occurred at both locations. That year, the school was established in a temporary building. Overly optimistic expectations regarding Coalmont's future prompted a series of businesses to propose or build premises. The Tulameen sawmill provided lumber for the company's buildings, bunkhouses, boarding houses, dwellings, and stores. The 4,600-metre (15,000 ft) daily capacity mill was soon moved from Tulameen and installed about 1.6 kilometres (1 mi) above the townsite.

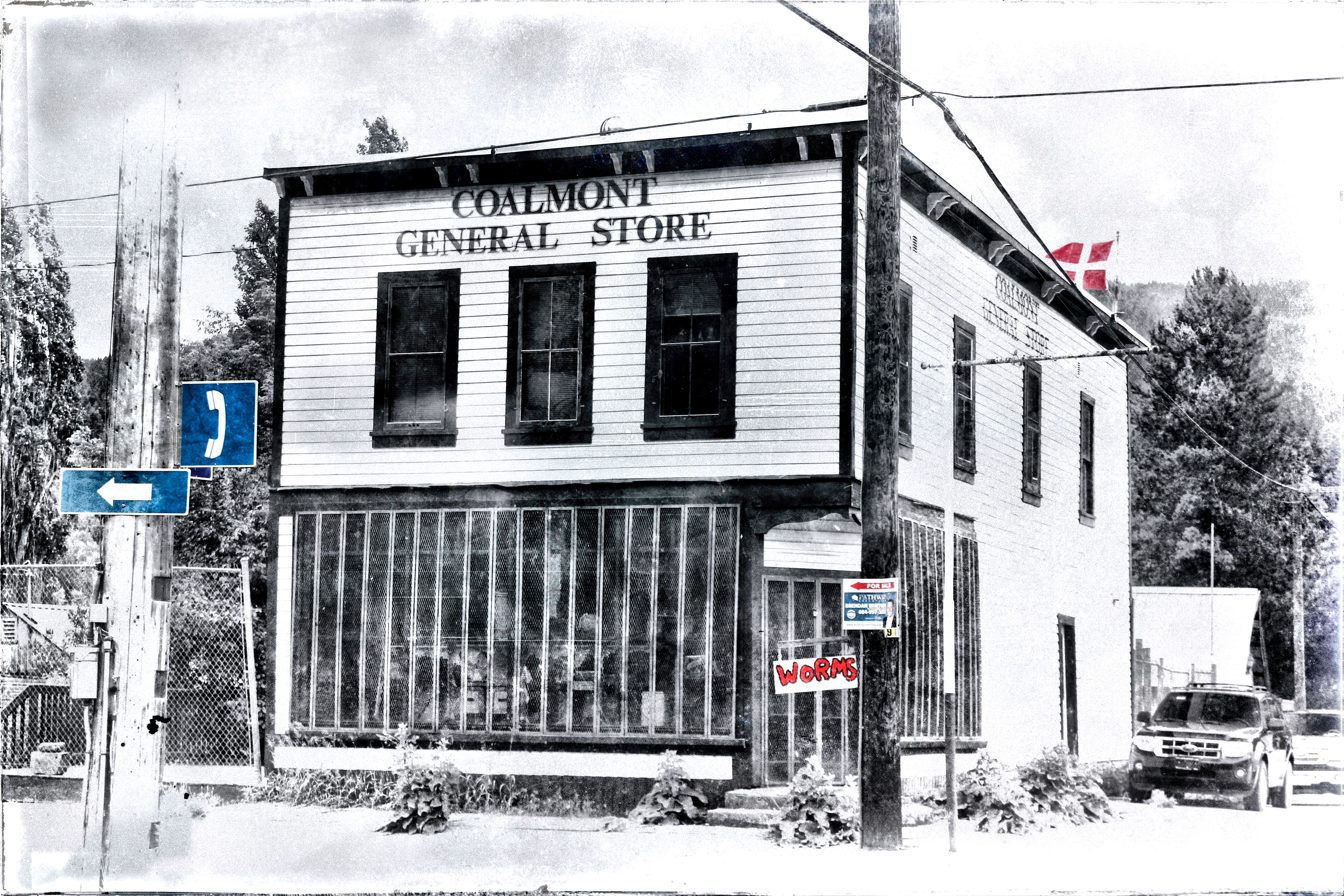
Former general store, Coalmont, 2020.

In 1912, the new schoolhouse opened (at Upper town), followed by the Coalmont Hotel months later. That year, the Coalmont Courier newspaper, managed by an unscrupulous editor, lasted only six months, and Granite Creek merchant F.P. Cook opened a Coalmont branch. By 1913, 182 lots had been sold in the townsite. That year, a suspension footbridge was installed across the Tulameen, presumably in Coalmont proper. In 1914, the Anglican parish hall opened as the All Saints church. Replaced by train service, the stage from Coalmont via Tulameen to Merritt ceased in 1916.

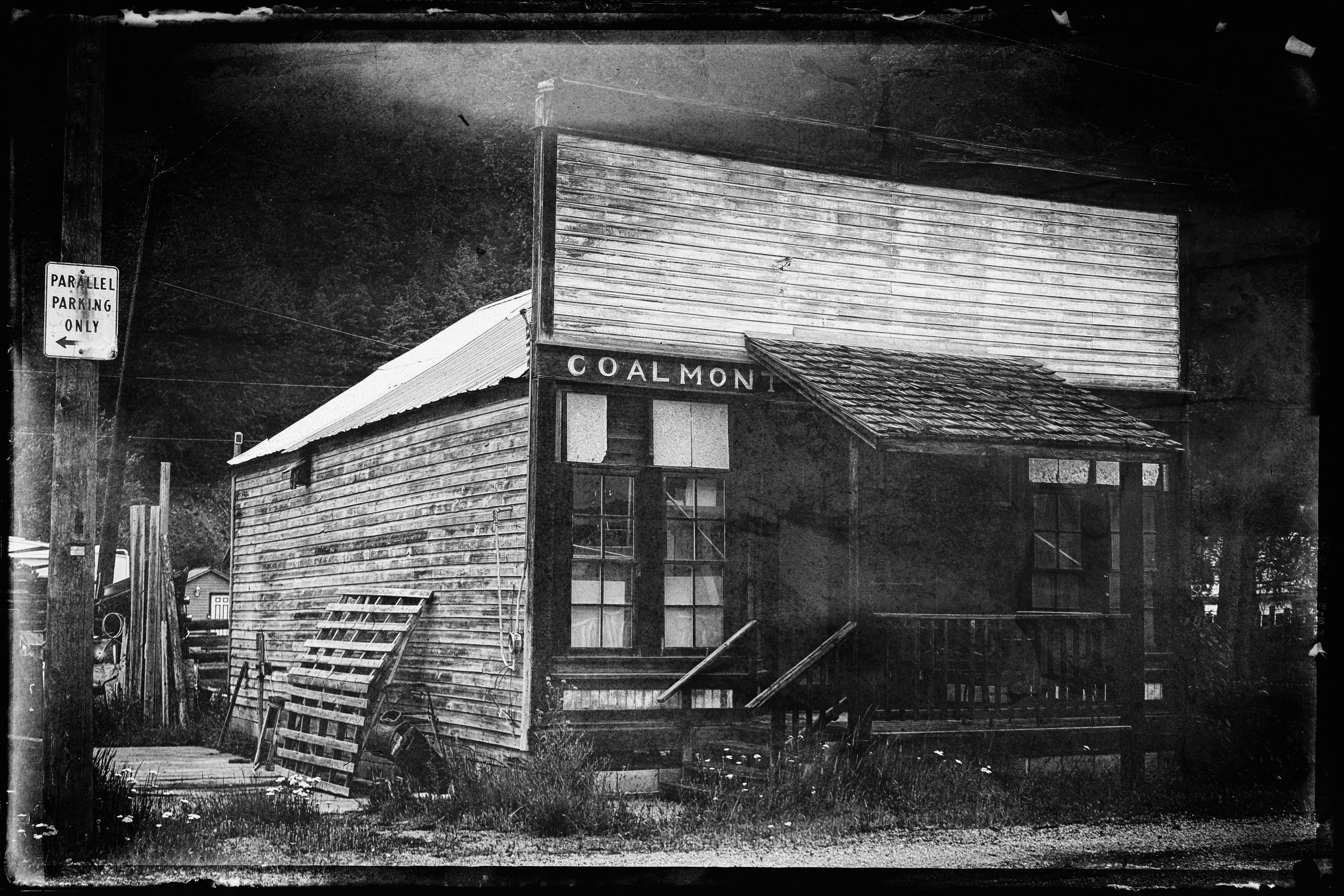
Former meat market, Coalmont, 2020.

In 1921, a Union Bank branch opened. In 1922, a new post office was erected. During 1922–23, a new 40-metre (132 ft) howe truss bridge was installed over the river, and a government liquor store opened. A police constable was in residence 1922–1940. The police post must have been initially at Upper town, because the jail building was later moved from there. In 1924, a gym was built at the back of the Presbyterian church for use by school children. Following church union in 1925, the Presbyterian church became a United church. That year, the bank was rebranded on the merger of the Union Bank into the Royal Bank. In 1927, Coalmont comprised a hotel, bank, jail, several stores, and Anglican and United churches. The school also used the church buildings. The next year, the Blakeburn–Coalmont road was rebuilt. In 1929, an electrical fire at the hotel caused limited damage.

The population was about 250 in 1930. The liquor store was not open from early 1930 to mid-1932. The hotel contains 16 bedrooms on the second floor and 16 on the third floor. The latter in need of renovations have been closed off since 1931. Anglican services were held at least into the early 1930s, but the vacant building was for sale in 1944. The Royal bank closed at the 1934 year end. The Canadian Bank of Commerce at Princeton took over these accounts. In 1935, the liquor store moved into the former Royal Bank premises.

Census population: Coalmont
Year	Pop.	±%
1961	66	—
1966	55	−16.7%
1971	70	+27.3%
1976	65	−7.1%
1981	59	−9.2%
1986	82	+39.0%
1991	180	+119.5%
1996		—
2001	66	—
2006	65	−1.5%

After mining ceased in 1940, Blakeburn became almost deserted. Closures at Coalmont included the liquor store and the F.P. Cook store. The shutdown of the power plant ended the Coalmont electricity and water supply facilities. In 1947, the Mainland Forest Products mill was built. Logging and sawmill operations gave the community a new lease of life, but the mill was bankrupt by 1950.

The school was extensively renovated in 1950. Coalmont United church was in use at least into the early 1950s. The post office relocated into the general store in 1952.

When electricity transmission lines came in 1965, dial phones succeeded the earlier switchboard. That year, a reunion for former Blackburn residents was held in Coalmont, which was repeated in 1981.

In 1971, the school closed. In 1972, the general store operations relocated across Parrish Ave and became the Coalmont Emporium.

In the 1980s, the remaining rooms of the hotel, which were on the second floor, were mothballed. In 1988, the post office closed.

In 1990, the Coalmont Emporium closed. In summertime, recreational owners have substantially boosted the population.

== Railway ==
The Vancouver, Victoria and Eastern Railway (VV&E) was a Great Northern Railway (GN) subsidiary. The northwestward advance of the VV&E rail head from Princeton reached Coalmont in early November 1911. In May 1912, GN began passenger services at Coalmont. The GN twice weekly schedule, which was unpredictable, was not listed on the timetables. The Kettle Valley Railway (KV) was a Canadian Pacific Railway (CP) subsidiary. When scheduled CP service via Coalmont and Spences Bridge to the coast began in June 1915, GN handed over all general freight and passenger traffic northwest of Princeton to the KV.

During the 1950s and 1960s, the location was mostly a log shipping point.

In 1991, the remainder of the abandoned track southeast of Spences Bridges was lifted.

The former railway right-of-way has been converted to the Kettle Valley Rail Trail segment of the Trans Canada Trail. Following the 2021 Pacific Northwest floods, at least five washouts of the trail between Princeton and Tulameen require extensive reconstruction.

== Later community ==
The practice by patrons of tacking spare banknotes onto the ceiling of the public bar at the historic Coalmont Hotel continued into the 2000s. The hotel celebrated its 100th anniversary in 2012. A stove chimney pipe fire in 2014 caused limited damage. In 2003, the Sternes converted the former CP pay office into a home and three-unit motel called the Mozey-On-Inn. The units were designated as the Bank, Saloon and Barbershop.

In 2015, the only public phone booth was not replaced when deliberately rammed by a vehicle. No cell phone coverage exists. That year, the hotel closed permanently. In 2019, the Coalmont Station Park was created.

In 2020, the novel "The Redemption of Hattie McBride" was published. McBride, a brothel keeper in Coalmont, was brutally murdered in 1920, but nobody was ever charged with the crime. In 2023, the Tulameen Fire Department completed building a firehall in Coalmont.

The former original general store occupies the Parrish Ave/Front St corner. Across the street, the former Coalmont Emporium building still stood in 2012. All that now remains is the concrete island of the gas bar, which was out front.

The community has no water mains or sewage pipes. The current passenger transit provider is BC Transit, which offers a request service. The Granite Creek cemetery, which overlooks the Granite Creek ghost town, is almost one kilometre southeast of Coalmont.

== See also ==
- List of ghost towns in British Columbia
