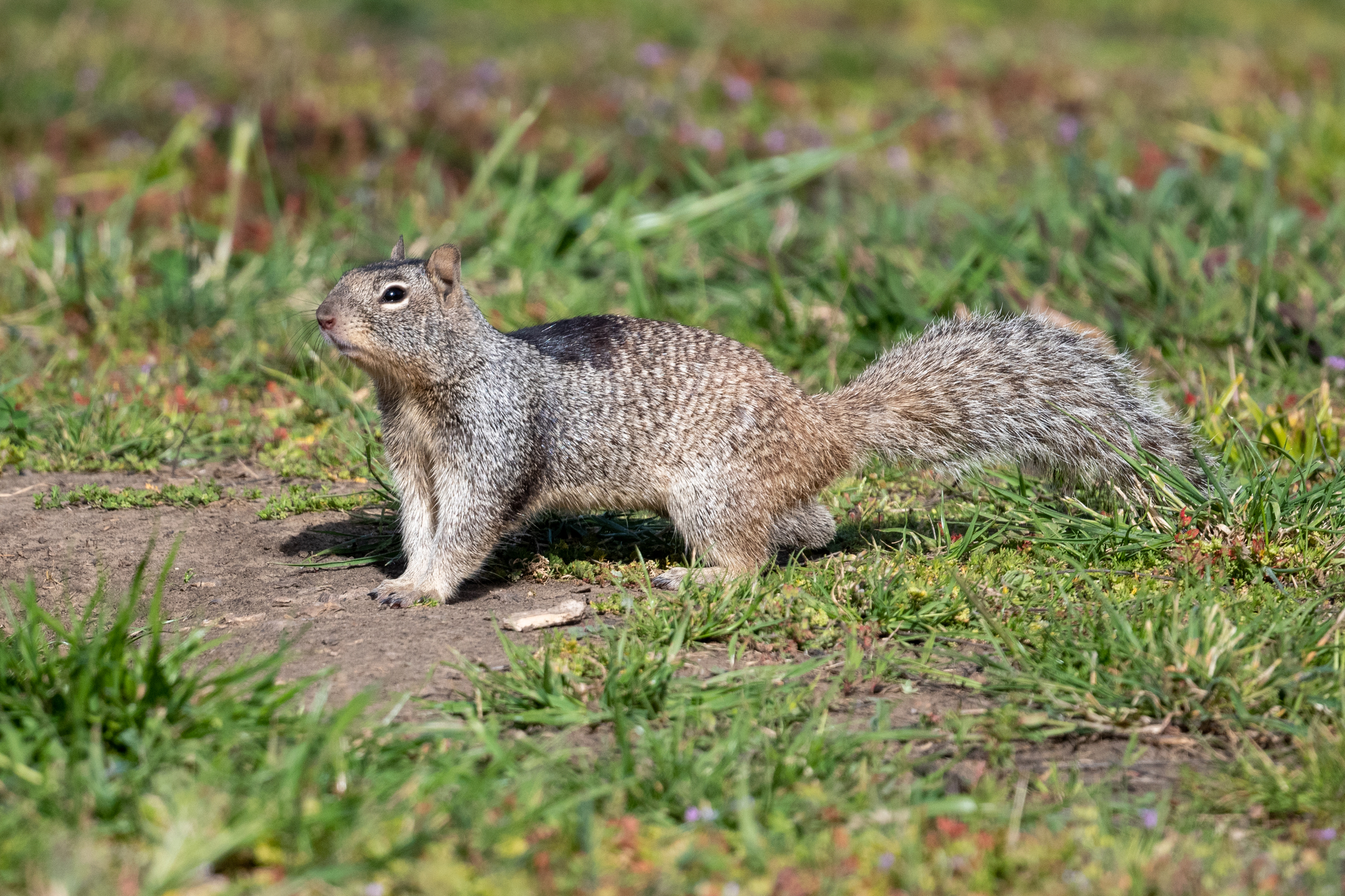

Scientific classification
- Kingdom: Animalia
- Phylum: Chordata
- Class: Mammalia
- Order: Rodentia
- Family: Sciuridae
- Genus: Otospermophilus
- Species: O. douglasii

Binomial name
- Otospermophilus douglasii (Richardson, 1829)

Synonyms
- see text

= Douglas ground squirrel =

Species of rodent

Douglas's ground squirrel (Otospermophilus douglasii) is a rodent that has brown fur with small white spots on its head, back and flanks, with a dark patch between and behind its silvery shoulders, a lighter belly and a long, fluffy tail. It lives in colonies and makes extensive tunnels to sleep, shelter from danger, store food, and foster its newborns. It is an important prey species for snakes, birds of prey and mammalian predators. It eats seeds, and during the growing season, a variety of other parts of plants. It is regarded an agricultural pest, may cause damage to infrastructure due to its burrowing, and is considered a potential risk for human health since it harbors several infectious diseases. It can primarily be found in grasslands and open woodlands, from the coastline to the mountains, in central and southern Washington, Oregon, and northern California. In 2023, the International Union for Conservation of Nature had not yet determined the conservation assessment for this species. Douglas ground squirrel was initially described as a species, but later considered to be a subspecies of Otospermophilus beecheyi, the California ground squirrel. However, comparison of homologous DNA suggests Douglas ground squirrel should be considered as a separate species.

== Description ==
Douglas's ground squirrel can be distinguished from ground squirrel species in other genera by its light brown to cream-colored belly, the long, fluffy tail, and the white ringed eyes. The stripe along the back is darker in the Douglas ground squirrel compared to the California ground squirrel, but also by the blackish-brown triangle between the neck and halfway down the back, the light brown shoulders, and the dense, silver coloured hairs, between shoulder and elbow, and along the tail, Dougas ground squirrel has white-tipped hairs whereas the California ground squirrel has a buffy wash on these hairs. The differences between these species are most profound in adults. The specking with white spots on the grayish brown fur on the back distinguishes Dougas ground squirrel from the rock squirrel, whose back is a mixture of grayish brown with cinnamon buff and light to dark blackish-brown. Rarely, the entire back of the rock squirrel is black, which has never been observed in Dougas ground squirrels.

=== Development ===
The hairless newborns have a wrinkled, red skin, closed eyes, little control over their movements, and weigh approximately 12 g. During the second week, hair starts to appear on the head and back, the skin has started to build up pigment and weight as doubled. During the fourth week, eyes begin to open, limbs are moving, heads can be raised, and young weigh about 35 g. At 7 weeks old, pigmented hair has appeared throughout the body, eyes can be fully opened, movements are controlled, and the young reach a weight of about 65 g. During the eighth week, young on average are 73 g and have begun taking solid food. In central Oregon juveniles venture outside of the burrows during June, and several weeks later in northern California. Juveniles appear later on the surface at higher elevations. The animals begin to put on body fat at the end of summer and reach their highest weight by the end of September. A period of inactivity mostly starts in November. Both adults and juveniles however emerge during warmer and dry moments during winter. The maximum life span may be 5–6 years.

=== Differences with related species ===
The three species of the genus Otospermophilus differ from other ground squirrel genera by the light brown to creamy belly, a long, fluffy tail, and a light ring around each of the eyes. Compared to the California ground squirrel, Douglas ground squirrel has a darker stripe along the length of its back, lighter brown shoulders, mostly with dense, silvery hairs on the sides of its neck, and a blackish-brown to charcoal-colored triangular patch that extends from the neck to about halfway down the spine. Douglas ground squirrel has white tipped hairs to the sides of the upper forelegs and the tail, while these hairs in the California ground squirrel have a buffy wash. These differences are most apparent in adult individuals and much less conspicuous in juveniles. Douglas ground squirrels can be distinguished from the rock squirrel because of the speckling of white spots over the grayish brown coat on its back. The rock squirrel on the other hand often also has a grayish brown back but combined with mix of cinnamon buff and light brown to bone to dark blackish-brown, and sometimes rock squirrels have an entirely back black.

== Taxonomy ==
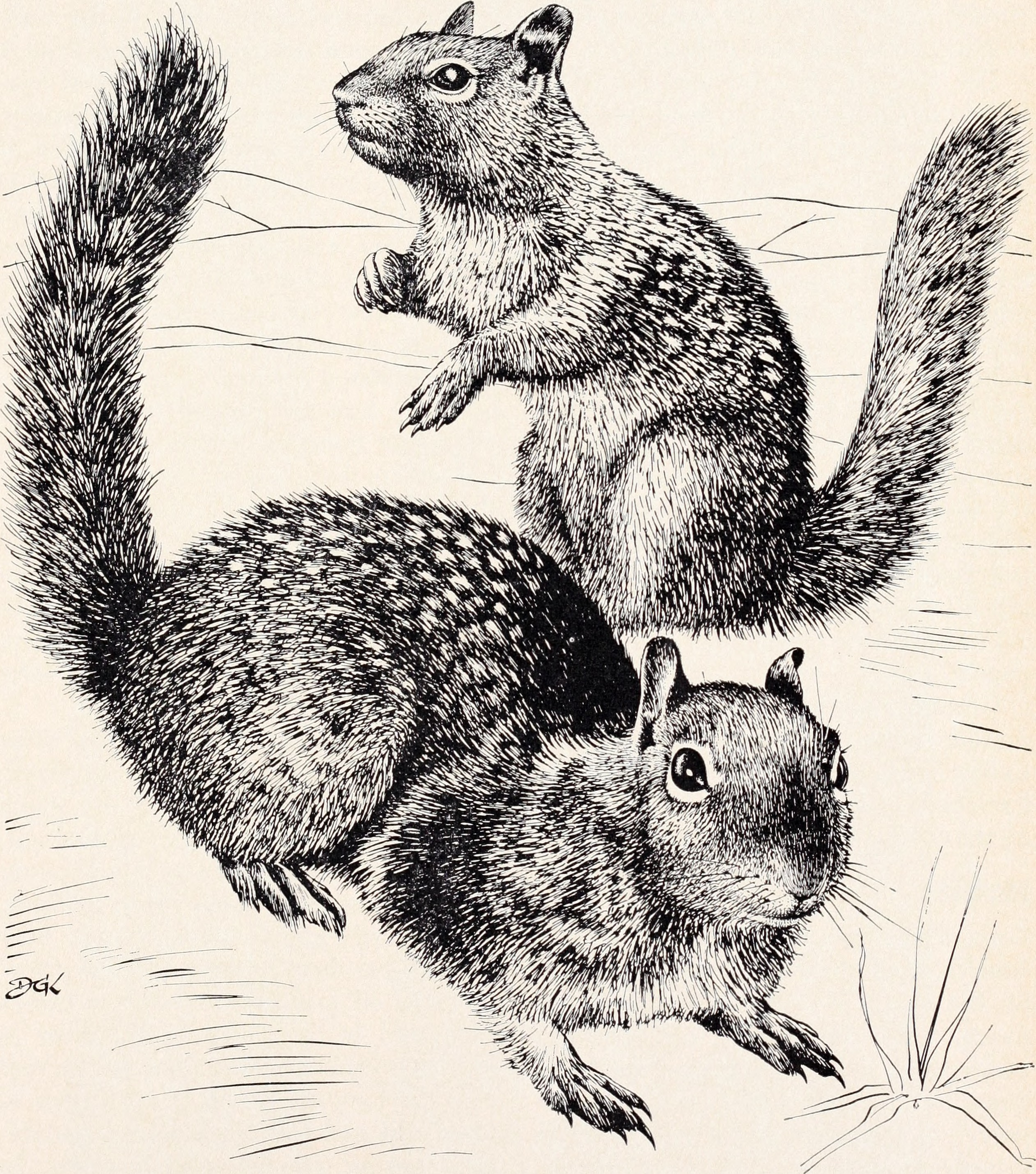
drawing of the California ground squirrel (top) and Douglas ground squirrel (bottom), from Control of field rodents on California farms (1965)

Douglas ground squirrel, found on the banks of the Columbia River, was first scientifically described by John Richardson in his book Fauna Boreali-Americana of the zoology of the northern parts of British America, published in 1829, and he called it Arctomys (Spermophilus) douglasii. The famous French paleontologist, geologist and naturalist George Cuvier suggested in 1831 to place the ground squirrels in a genus separate from the groundhog, creating the new combination Spermophilus douglasii. In 1874 Joel Asaph Allen regarded Douglas ground squirrel as a variety of the rock squirrel and made the new combination Spermophilus grammurus var. douglasi, incorrectly spelling the species name. Walter Pierce Bryant also made a mistake in copying Richardson's species name, so creating Spermophilus grammurus douglassi. In 1901, Daniel Giraud Elliot placed Douglas ground squirrel in a new subgenus and so compounded the name Spermophilus (Otospermophilus) grammurus douglasi, again an erroneous spelling. In 1903, Elliot moved Douglas ground squirrel along with the rock squirrel to a genus that currently encompasses only European and Asian ground squirrel and made the combination Citellus variegatus douglasi, continuing his earlier incorrect spelling. Joseph Grinnell considered Douglas ground squirrel a subspecies of the California ground squirrel, forming the new combination Citellus beecheyi douglasi in 1913 and copying the incorrect spelling of Richardson's epithet douglasii. In 1918 Grinnell raised Douglas ground squirrel to be a separate species making the combination Citellus douglasii. L.K. Couch, in an article on its distribution, made an error in this name, creating the combination Citellus douglasi. Gerrit Smith Miller Jr. raised the subgenus Otospermophilus to a separate genus, maintaining the Douglas ground squirrel as a subspecies of the rock squirrel, combining the new name Otospermophilus grammurus douglasii in 1924. In 1931, E.R. Edge was the first to use the current name combination Otospermophilus douglasii.

Douglas ground squirrel is classified in the Rodent order, suborder Sciuromorpha, Squirrel family, Ground squirrel tribe. Several scientific authors considered it one of eight subspecies of the California ground squirrel. Recent comparison of homologous DNA prompts the recognition of California ground squirrel, rock squirrel and Douglas ground squirrel as separate species, as well as including a form from southern Baja California, formerly known as Otospermophilus atricapillus to subspecies of the California ground squirrel. A biogeographic barrier separates the populations of Douglas ground squirrel and the California ground squirrel, the former being restricted to the west and north, and the latter east and south of the Sacramento River. The precise division between these species in southeastern Yolo and Solano counties, and along the northwestern margin of the Sacramento–San Joaquin River Delta, needs further research. Experiments in a laboratory showed these two species can easily hybridize.

=== Naming ===
The genus name is a compilation of the Greek words ὠτός (otos) meaning "ear", σπέρματος (spérmatos) "seed" and φίλος (phílos) "loved". This name was chosen because this group of ground squirrels has relatively large ears. The species was named in honor of Scottish botanist David Douglas, who explored the Pacific coast and was offered the skin of the type specimen.

=== Phylogeny ===
Comparison of homologous DNA provides insights in the relationship of the Douglas ground squirrel to other species. The latest common ancestor of Douglas ground squirrel and the California ground squirrel has been estimated to have lived approximately 0.725 million years ago, coinciding with the moment when the San Joaquin and Sacramento River started flowing, creating a barrier for gene flow between the populations that would give rise to these two species. This research also suggests that the rock squirrel may best be regarded as a subspecies of the California ground squirrel, but more genetic samples are needed to be sure. The genera Otospermophilus (Douglas ground squirrel, California ground squirrel, and rock squirrel) and Callospermophilus (Golden-mantled ground squirrel, Cascade golden-mantled ground squirrel, and Sierra Madre ground squirrel) are closest relatives.

== Behaviour ==
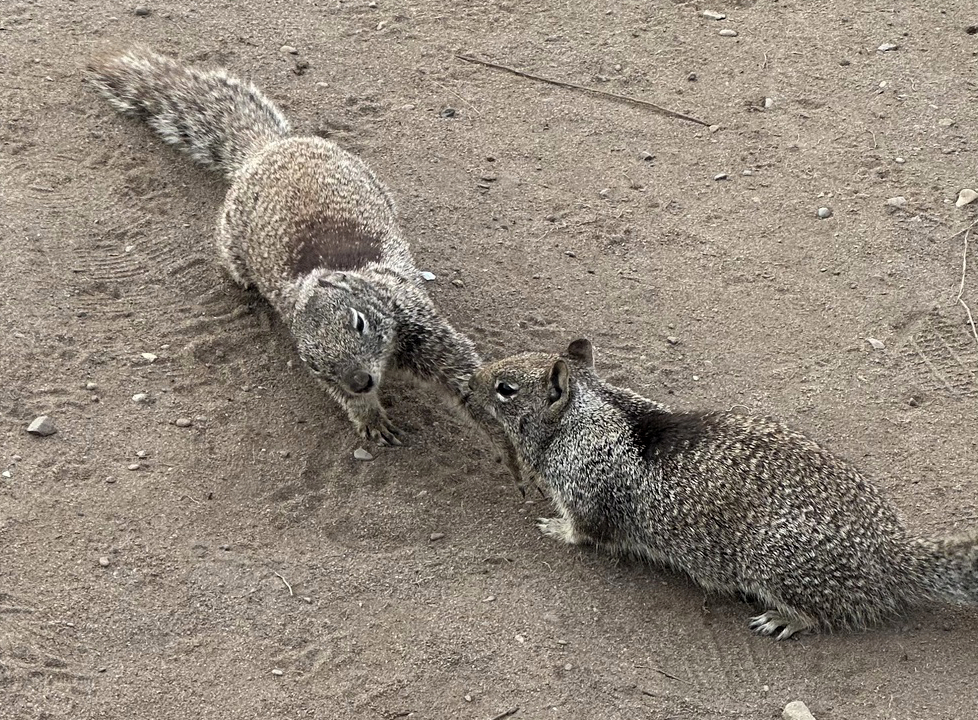
Douglas ground squirrels fighting

Douglas ground squirrel digs underground burrows it often shares with other individuals. These burrows have several functions, including food storage, giving birth and nursing the young, providing shelter from bad weather and to escape from predators. During spring and summer, these squirrels spend more time at the surface, eating and collecting food. The young, born early in the year, also become more active over the season. From November through to January, with fewer day light hours, less favourable weather, and less fresh food, the animals spend more time in their burrows. Large groups of these squirrels have several tunnel systems that are used by both males and females. In these large groups, the number of adult females can be twice as high as the number of males. Adult resident males are probably aggressive to males from the outside and so largely keep territories in the same hands over the seasons. Adult males may often act as sentries, chirping loudly to warn the group of potential predators, illustrating one benefit of living in social groups. Sentries distinguish between birds of prey and harmless avian species. Several types of contact between group members are distinguished. An individual greeting another squirrel and then retreating is called "approach and withdrawal". Mutual grooming, or individuals sniffing and touching noses, cheeks, body, and region under the tail base is called "greeting and social investigation". Playfull chasing, boxing, wrestling and mounting each other, mostly by juveniles, is called "play". When one individual retreats from advances of another squirrel, apparently to avoid aggression, is called "displacement". Attaining warning postures, pushing other individuals, sometimes escalating into biting and kicking, to make the opponent retreat is called "aggression". This may include females chasing off other adults, and aggression between males. A male repeatedly tapping a female on forelimb or shoulder is a courtship behavior intended to elicit mating. This is called "push-paw".

=== Reproduction ===
The mating season in western Oregon usually starts late February and extends into early March, but timing of reproduction differs between regions. Females are mostly pregnant at the end of March. The babies are born during May or June. The pups are weaned by mid-July. In central western Oregon, mating starts late March and peaked early April. In this region births take place from the last week of April and into May. Gestation is estimated at 25–30 days. Females in northern California carried 5–6 embryos. At the southern end of its range breeding is observed mid-March. Here, young appear at the start of July. Larger females will generally carry more embryos, up to 7, while smaller females carry fewer embryos, as few as 3. However, sometimes embryos are aborted. Females will likely produce a single litter each year.

== Ecology ==
Douglas ground squirrel is a species that creates large tunnel systems that serve to escape predators, rest and hibernate, store food, and nurse the young. Most of the digging occurs in autumn and winter. Burrows range from 0.3 to 3.3 m in depth and tend to be larger and more complex on the plains, particularly in loamy or sandy soil. In some flat pastureland up to 36 burrows per hectare have been found. Some have a single entrance, but other burrows are connected underground. Above ground, paths connect entrances. Some tunnels include chambers for food storage, bedding, feces, and debris. Some tunnels are nearly vertical, probably for ventilation or drainage. Burrows in northern California are 11 cm in diameter, and 0.7–1.5 m in length, with most burrows 0.75–1.20 m below the surface, but some burrows extended to more than 2.0 m below. The average burrow length is 5 m and the average depth was 43 cm, with the longest burrows between 10 and 14 m, and the greatest depth at 84 cm. Burrow openings often had a slightly elevated mound of dirt providing an observation perch, but elsewhere burrow entrances were hidden among rocks, logs, bushes, or tree roots. Squirrels generally avoid digging burrows under large tree canopies. Dust-bathing areas are usually adjacent to the burrows and are used often to deter fleas and ticks that can be abundant in the burrows.

=== Food ===
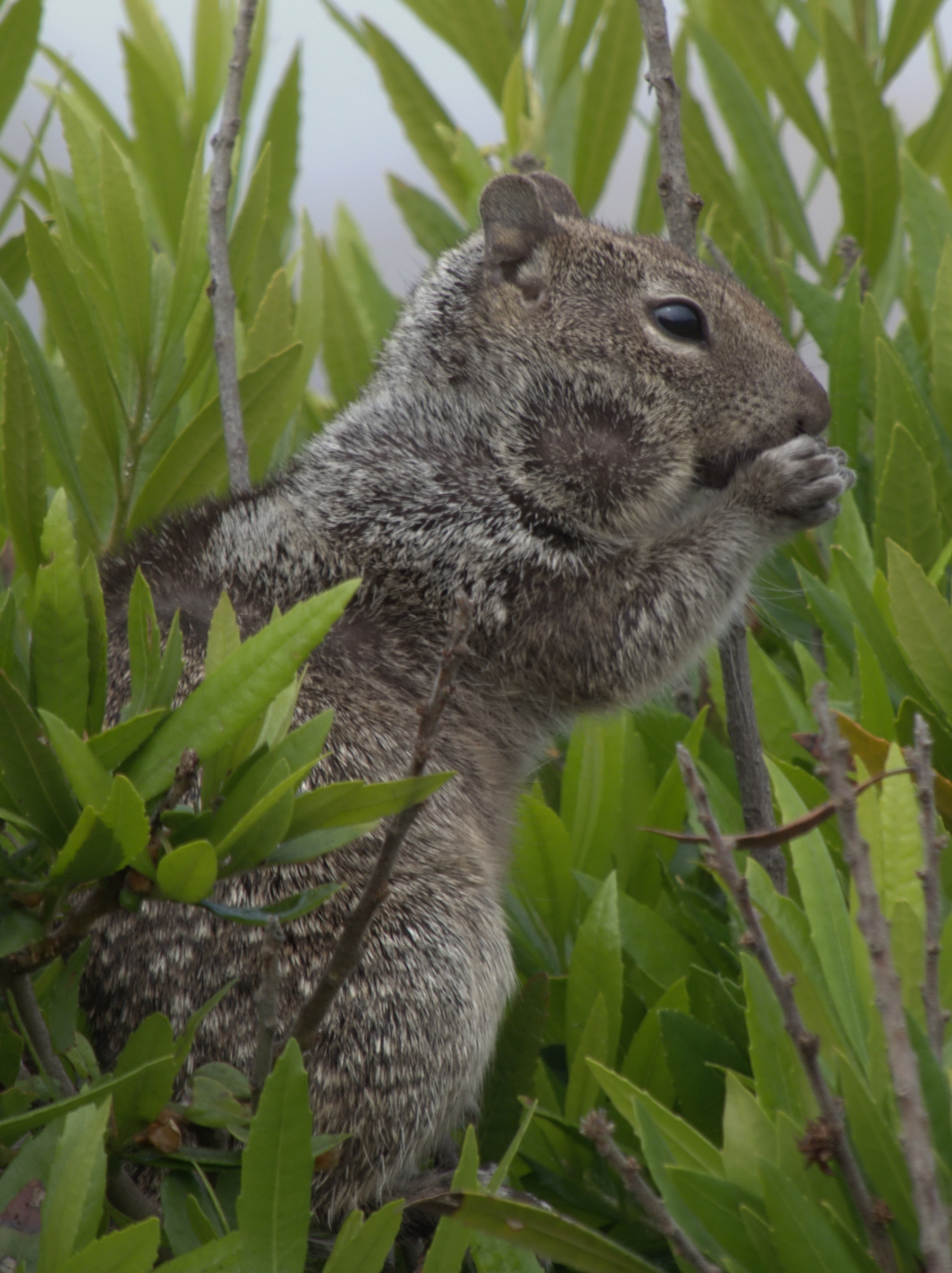
Douglas ground squirrel stuffing its pouches

Douglas ground squirrel likely has a diet comparable to that of the California ground squirrel. This close relative has a varied diet consisting of seeds, nuts, tubers, roots, grasses, flowers, and fruits. Direct observations of Douglas ground squirrels foraging, and analysis of the content of cheek-pouches and stomachs, identified as foods various acorns, Chinquapin nuts, maple seeds, beaked hazel, pine seeds, spruce seeds, California brome, cheatgrass, velvet grass, bitterbush, California bay, California buckeye, California burclover, false dandelion, filarees, fireweeds, St. John's Worts, small-flowered lupin, common manzanita, English plantain, wild roses, Maltese star thistle, milk thistle, tarweeds, skunkbush, tanoak, and cultivated crops such as almond, apricot, cherry, pear, hazelnut, walnut, barley and wheat. Although primarily vegetarian, the diets includes insects, such as grasshoppers, bait from traps intended for carnivores, and eggs such as from the California quail. Cannibalism also occurs. At high population densities, food close to the burrows will become depleted, thus forcing the animals to forage at greater distances, increasing their vulnerability for predation. Heavy snowfall and intense rains may kill the animals even when sheltering and may temporarily lead to a decrease in group size. In spring, Douglas ground squirrel become more active when temperatures rise, the daylight hours increase, and more food is available. During the fall, when these developments are reversed, the animals enter into a state of torpor, which is not true hibernation. This may start between September and November and end late February to early March. At higher elevations however, such as in the Siskiyou Mountains, Douglas ground squirrel may truly hibernate from November through to April. But even here, some individuals may emerge as early as late February. Because bobcats still feed on these squirrels during winter, there must be some level of surface activity during these months. In general, there may be slightly more to about double the number of adult females than males in a colony.

=== Predators, competitors and commensals ===
Douglas ground squirrel are being preyed on the Pacific gopher snake, northern Pacific rattlesnake, common raven, great horned owl, golden eagle, red-tailed hawk, loggerhead shrike, weasels, fisher, bobcat, coyote, red fox, gray fox, feral cats and dogs. The western gray squirrel, white-footed mouse, voles, jackrabbits, mourning dove, and sparrows compete for food with Douglas ground squirrels. Which other species share burrow systems with Douglas ground squirrels has not been studied in detail, but at least burrowing owls have been observed to use uninhabited burrows.

== Conservation, damage and threats ==
The International Union for Conservation of Nature and Natural Resources Red List currently provides no conservation status for Douglas ground squirrel. However, the California ground squirrel is listed as a species of "Least Concern", having a stable population and few known threats. Being a highly comparable sister species, this suggest that Douglas ground squirrel may have an equally low risk of extinction. Additional research is required however to underpin its conservation status.

Like the California ground squirrel, Douglas ground squirrel is often associated with damage to commercial crops such as almonds, apricots, barley, cherries, hazelnuts, walnuts, and wheat. Since the California ground squirrel causes substantial fodder losses rangelands, the same is probably true for Douglas ground squirrel. Burrowing by all ground squirrel species cause damage and undermine buildings, retaining walls, and infrastructure. In northern California, tunneling by Douglas ground squirrel affects the structural integrity of the underground, increasing seepage, which may ultimately lead to levee failure.

Douglas ground squirrel densities have been kept in check by shooting, trapping, fumigation and modification of their habitat. Grains soaked in rodenticide is the main method for population control of Douglas ground squirrels. However, poison bait is known to harm non-target species, and other animals scavenging dead squirrels may be secondarily poisoned. Physical destruction of burrows is probably only effective in the very short term, since in most cases, these areas will quickly be recolonized by ground squirrels. Tilling of the soil beyond the level of the tunnel systems may be effective in deterring recolonization. Ground squirrels are regularly killed by vehicles when crossing roads.
