= Link Lake =

Lake Link or Link Lake may refer to:

Canada

- Ontario
  - Link Lake in the Kenora District
  - Link Lake in Temagami, in the Nipissing District
  - Link Lake in the Timiskaming District
- British Columbia
  - Link Lake in the Central Coast near Ocean Falls
  - Link Lake in the Southern Interior near Bankeir

United States

- Link Lake in Matanuska-Susitna Borough, Alaska
- Lake Link in Polk County, Florida
- South Three Links Lakes in Idaho County, Idaho
- Minnesota
  - Lake Linka in Pope County
  - Bobo Link Lake in Cass County
  - Link Lake in Itasca County
  - Link Lake in Lake County
  - Missing Link Lake in Cook County
  - Raven Lake a.k.a. Link Lake in Lake County
- Link Lake in Flathead County, Montana
- Oregon
  - Link Lake in Jefferson County
  - Link Lake in Lake County
- Texas
  - Link Lake Number 1 in Webb County
  - Link Lake Number 2 in Webb County
