= Granite Creek =

Granite Creek may refer to:

- Granite Creek (British Columbia), a creek and townsite in British Columbia, Canada
- Granite Creek (Arizona), a tributary of the Verde River in Arizona, United States
- Granite Creek (Black Rock Desert), a stream in Nevada

== See also ==
- 20 Granite Creek, an album by Moby Grape
