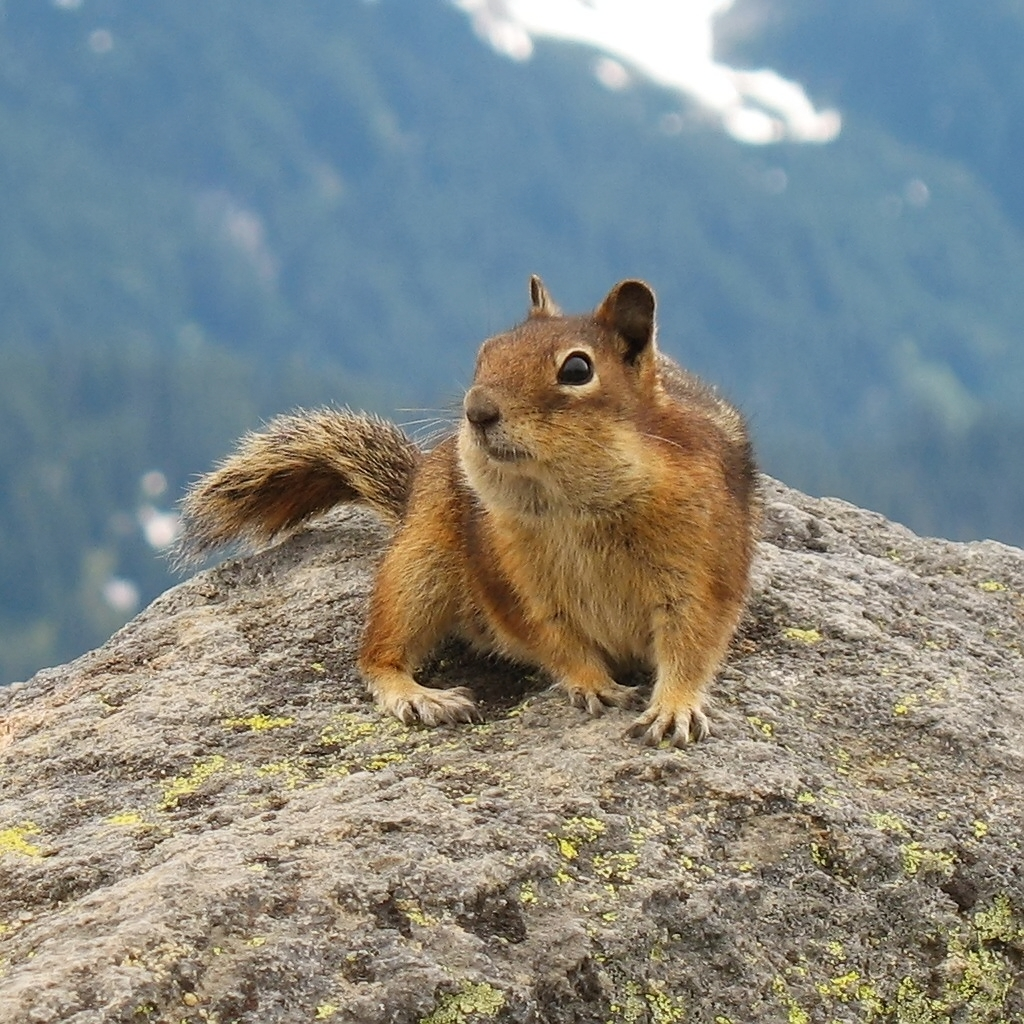

Conservation status
- Least Concern (IUCN 3.1)

Scientific classification
- Kingdom: Animalia
- Phylum: Chordata
- Class: Mammalia
- Infraclass: Placentalia
- Order: Rodentia
- Family: Sciuridae
- Genus: Callospermophilus
- Species: C. saturatus

Binomial name
- Callospermophilus saturatus (Rhoads, 1895)

Synonyms
- Spermophilus saturatus

= Cascade golden-mantled ground squirrel =

Species of rodent

The Cascade golden-mantled ground squirrel (Callospermophilus saturatus) is a species of rodent in the family Sciuridae, in the order Rodentia. It is the largest species of the three within the genus Callospermophilus. It is found in the Cascade Mountains in the province of British Columbia, Canada, and the state of Washington, United States.

== Morphology ==
Larger in size than its C. madrensis and C. lateralis counterparts, C. saturatus has a vague russet color outlining its head and shoulders and running down the length of its body (at least 286 mm).

== Distribution ==
Callospermophilus saturatus occurs in the northwestern United States, north of the Columbia River, south of the Tulameen River in British Columbia, and west of the Similkameen River. No fossils have yet been found. C. saturatus is isolated from its sister species S. lateralis by the Columbia River; their differentiation is likely due to allopatric speciation.

== Physiology ==
At birth, C. saturatus are ectothermic. Development of endothermy occurs gradually as individuals grow, increasing both body mass and amount of body fur. Individuals removed from their mother at 6 days of age lost body temperature at a faster rate than at 36 days, when individuals were able to maintain a high internal body temperature and determined to be homeothermic. This 36-day mark is conveniently the age at which offspring leave their burrows. Individuals remained homeothermic in response to a 2-day removal of food and water at 2-week intervals. Even with this drastically reduced body mass, torpor was not induced. Smaller individuals did become hypothermic, however, and were returned to the mother to be re-warmed.

Daily energy expenditures showed a small but significant increase of 10% as litter size increased, across a range of 3 to 5 offspring, the norm for the species. Body mass, time spent above ground and time spent foraging were not correlated. For the large amount energy contained in the mother's milk, changes in metabolism were small. Body mass and age of offspring was independent of litter size. The fact that daily energy expenditure does not vary with litter size suggests that other factors, such as habitat quality, affect number of offspring.

Callospermophilus saturatus have been noted to move in two distinct ways – walking (mean speed of .21 m/s) and running (mean speed of 3.63 m/s). 26.9% of total time spent daily above ground was spent walking, while only 3.6% was spent running. It is noted that individuals run at their maximum aerobic speed of 3.6 m/s instead of the more maintainable minimum running pace of 2 m/s in order to minimize predation. C. saturatus moved an average of 5 km/day – 1.5 km walking and 3.3 km running. This considerable distance required 28.75 kJ/day of net added energy cost to do so, a 29% increase above BMR and 13% of daily energy expenditure.

== Behavior ==
Examination of alarm calls in response to Canis lupus familiaris among several species of ground squirrels showed that C. saturatus have a dialect of their own. Vocalizations were distinct, and could be identified 100% of the time by a discriminant source. This suggests that vocalizations can be used in addition to genetics and morphology to differentiate and designate species.

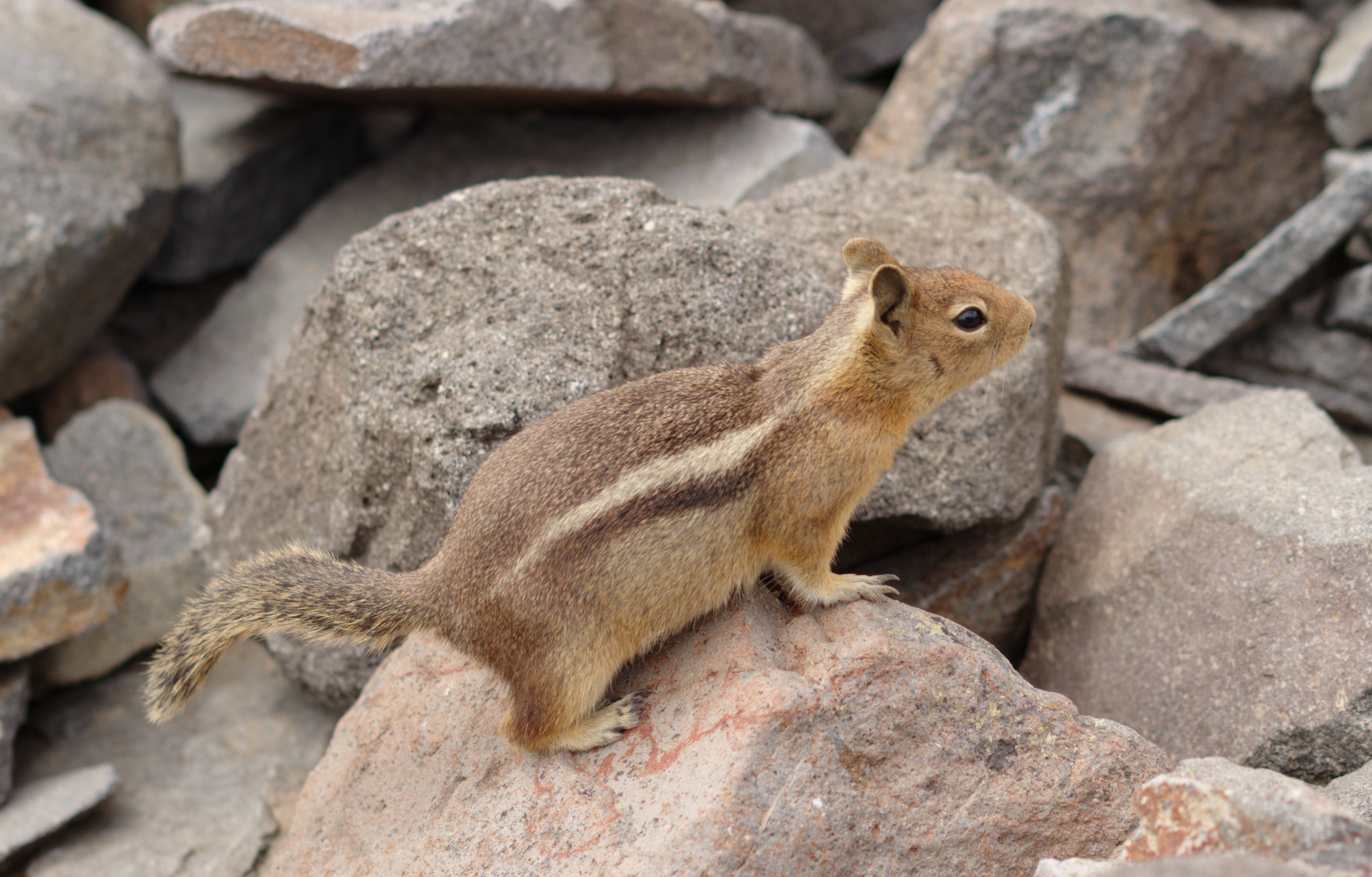
A Cascade golden-mantled ground squirrel on Mount Rainier.
