= Bankeir, British Columbia =

Bankeir
- Community
- Location of Bankeir in British Columbia
- Coordinates: 49°42′59″N 120°14′04″W
- Country: Canada
- Province: British Columbia
- Region: Similkameen Country
- Regional district: Okanagan-Similkameen
- Time zone: UTC-8 (PST)
- Area codes: 250, 778, 236, & 672
- Highways: Hwy 40
- Website: Osprey Area

Bankeir is an unincorporated community encompassing the area west from Osprey Lake in the Similkameen region of south central British Columbia, Canada. On Highway 40, the place is by road about 41 kilometres (25 mi) northeast of Princeton and 69 kilometres (43 mi) northwest of Penticton.

== Early trail ==
"Indian Road" was the name used to describe the First Nations trail on the 1827 Archibald McDonald map. Linking the later Princeton and Peachland, the trail followed the shores of Chain, Link, and Osprey lakes. The route was rehabilitated as a cattle trail in 1874 and used as a pack trail from 1885. The point at which the trail crossed Trout Creek was called Princeton Crossing.

== Early post offices ==
Historically, Jellicoe and Mazama were the more identifiable communities in the general area.

In 1913, John Spencer Chapman pre-empted a 65-hectare (160-acre) property at Princeton Crossing. Based in the Chapman residence, the post office opened in 1914. Initially called Princeton Crossing, the postal name changed to Mazama to avoid confusion with Princeton. The rename recounted a memorable stay Chapman had experienced with friends in Mazama, Washington. Although situated kilometres east of the lake, the final name change was to Osprey Lake 18 months before closure in 1951.

Southwestward, the post office, which resided in the home of William James Clement for over a decade, existed 1934–1963. Originally adjacent to the Jellicoe train station and called Jellicoe Station-Bankeir, the post office had relocated to the south end of Chain Lake by 1953, been renamed Bankeir in 1954, and moved to just north of Link Lake in 1957. However, the name Bankeir PO was in common use by the late 1930s.

== Osprey Lake ==
Osprey Lake, which is named on Trutch's 1871 map, indicates the noticeable presence of osprey in the three-lake area (Secret, Link, and Osprey lakes).

The length of Osprey Lake is about 1.7 kilometres (1.1 mi). The surface area is 37 hectares (91 acres) and elevation is 1,098 metres (3,602 ft) above sea level. The mean depth is unspecified and maximum depth is 12 metres (39 ft). The shoreline is 4.2 kilometres (2.6 mi).

Like railway competitors at Otter Lake before mechanical refrigeration, the Canadian Pacific Railway (CP) cut large volumes of ice by hand from Osprey Lake. Stored in icehouses, the large blocks were used to cool reefer cars carrying fruit in summer.

== Chain Lake ==
The length of Osprey Lake is about 1.8 kilometres (1.1 mi). The surface area is 49 hectares (121 acres) and elevation is 1,006 metres (3,301 ft) above sea level. Hayes Creek is the main inflow and outflow. The mean depth is 4 metres (13 ft) and maximum depth is 6 metres (20 ft). The shoreline is 4.3 kilometres (2.7 mi).

The lake level increased by the building of an earth dam at the outlet in 1915 and its enlargement in 1950. To reduce algae growth, sedimentation, and infilling, additional water was diverted from Shinnish Creek in 1968. When assessing the poor state of repair, the need to completely rebuild the dam was identified in 1957 and 2021.

== Recreation ==
Stocking with trout spawn has taken place since 1923 at Chain Lake and 1925 at Osprey Lake.

The Osprey Lake Lodge operated since at least 1945.

In 1968, Link and Osprey lakes were rehabilitated to remove course fish.

By the early 2000s, the lodge had been refurbished and renamed as the Osprey Lake Retreat. This B&B, which is at the western end of the lake, has an adjacent boat launch. The five-vehicle recreation site on the north end of the lake also has a steep boat launch. Link Lake has a three-vehicle recreation site with a cartop boat launch. A recreational campsite also exists on Chain Lake.

The main summer activities are birdwatching, hiking, cycling, canoeing, horseback riding, ATV riding, and fishing. Winter ones are snowshoeing, snowmobiling, and ice-fishing.

== Railway ==
The Kettle Valley Railway (KV) was a CP subsidiary. When CP explored four separate routes west of Osprey Lake, the northward options comprised Siwash Creek/Pothole Creek/Quilchena Creek, Summers Creek, and Otter Creek. In April 1912, CP announced a southward choice via Princeton. CP's Thomas Shaughnessy claimed he would build a direct Kootenays to the coast line, but the wavering route chosen was more suited to local traffic. Chief engineer Andrew McCulloch was not given the freedom to select the optimal route.

The westward advance of the KV rail head from Penticton reached Osprey Lake in early December 1913, where a siding was installed that month. Tracklaying was halted because the route westward was not finalized. By late summer 1914, the track had only advanced 16 kilometres (10 mi) farther.

In May 1989, CP ran the final freight train through the location. In 1991, the rails were lifted between Penticton and Spences Bridge.

The former CP right-of-way, which runs adjacent to the lakes, has been converted to the Kettle Valley Rail Trail segment of the Trans Canada Trail.

== Roads ==
The railway route and wagon road east of Princeton mostly followed Five Mile Creek. Initially called Five Mile Rd, road construction was completed to within 5 kilometres (3 mi) of Chain Lake in 1911.

During the railway construction, a tote road was built westward from Summerland, which connected with Princeton in 1914. However, the eastern end of this road through the narrow Trout Creek Canyon soon ceased to exist. In 1931, volunteers built a rudimentary road that joined the short gap between Glen and Thirsk. The province reluctantly agreed to improve this link to Peachland. In 1944, the province built a direct road to Summerland over the Bald Range. Later, these roads were greatly improved for logging access.

Around 1980, the gravelled western part of Highway 40 (a.k.a. Princeton Summerland Rd or Osprey Lake Rd) was paved. The paving from Princeton ends just east of Osprey Lake, but the gravel road to Summerland is properly maintained. A forest service road connects to Peachland.

== Established community ==
The Osprey Lake Waterworks District installed an untreated surface water system in the mid-1960s. To comply with government demands, a closure of the system was announced in 1913.

In 1980, the installation of microwave radio transmitters introduced telephone service. Electricity transmission lines arrived that decade.

In 2000, the official Bankeir name was revived.

In 2013, the Hayes Creek Fire Hall was completed. The next year, a community hall was built above the fire hall. At Bankeir proper, rental cabins exist, but the store closed in 2014.

The Osprey Lake area is known as the community of Bankeir. About 40 full time residences and 100 seasonal cabins exist. Annual community events include snow golf, a snowmobile poker run, a children's Easter egg hunt, and a Labour Day weekend corn roast.
