= Collins Gulch =

Creek in the Similkameen region of British Columbia, Canada

Coordinates: 49°32′N 120°44′W

Collins Gulch is a creek in the Similkameen region of British Columbia. Collins Gulch is a stream which flows into the Tulameen River from the south side. The creek is about 1.5 miles (2.4 km) east of the village of Tulameen, British Columbia. Collins Gulch was discovered in 1885. It was mined by both Europeans and Chinese for gold. Early mining efforts were successful although diggings were exhausted quite rapidly.
