= Lawless Creek =

Creek in the Similkameen region of British Columbia, Canada

- Location of Lawless Creek in British Columbia

Location
- Country: Canada
- Province: British Columbia
- Region: Similkameen

Physical characteristics
- Mouth
  - coordinates: 49°32′21″N 120°50′34″W
- Length: 13.7 mi (22.0 km)

Lawless Creek (formerly known as Bear Creek) is a south-east flowing tributary of the Tulameen River, located in the Similkameen region of British Columbia. Lawless Creek flows south-east into the Tulameen River about 4 miles (6.4 km) west and northwest of the old village of Tulameen, British Columbia.

The lower 5.6 miles (9 kilometres) of the creek flows through a narrow deep valley, which gradually widens upstream to form a broader, more open valley. The narrow section contains shallow gravels confined to the creek bed. Columbia sculpin can be found in the waters.

At the Bear Creek occurrence some gold and minor platinum have been recovered from gravels near the mouth of the creek. One gold nugget found in 1886 weighed 585 grams.

The gravels were mined intermittently between 1886 and 1899. Estimated production for 1886 is 1800 grams. Pine Valley Explorers have conducted some development work on its placer leases since 1982.
