= Otter Lake Provincial Park =

Provincial park in British Columbia

- IUCN category II (national park)
- Location within British Columbia
- Interactive map of Otter Lake Provincial Park
- Location: Otter Lake, British Columbia Canada
- Nearest town: Princeton
- Coordinates: 49°35′12″N 120°46′26″W
- Area: 55 ha (140 acres)
- Created: 1963
- Governing body: BC Parks
- Website: bcparks.ca/otter-lake-park/

Otter Lake Park is on Otter Lake in the Similkameen region of south central British Columbia, Canada. This provincial park comprises the main site on the west shore at the northern end of the lake and a small site at Tulameen on the southern shore. On Coalmont Rd, the main site is by road about 79 kilometres (49 mi) south of Merritt and 32 kilometres (20 mi) northwest of Princeton.

== Access ==
The smaller picnic and day-use area is at Tulameen and the lakeside campground is at the main site about 5 kilometres (3 mi) farther north along the road. The operating season is mid-May to late September. A locked gate blocks vehicle access during the off season, but foot entry is available year round.

== Legislation ==
In July 1963, the two-location park was created, but the total size was not specified.

The following references to the park area are either incomplete or significant approximations. The 1977 bill to enlarge the park to about 49 hectares (121 acres) was enacted the next year.

In 2003, the size was noted as 53 hectares (131 acres).

In 2010, 1.7 hectares (4.2 acres) were deleted to remove an existing road corridor, which would result in the often quoted 51 hectares (126 acres). In 2018, a proposed 6-hectare (15-acre) foreshore addition was announced.

The present size is described as being approximately 55 hectares (136 acres).

== Park facilities ==
The campground site has 45 campsites, four pit toilets, four flush toilets, and four cold water taps. The boat launch has been closed but the Tulameen community one is operative. The Tulameen site has six picnic tables, two pit toilets, and a hand pump for well water.

== Recreational activities ==
A nature trail exists along the foreshore but hiking the rugged terrain outside the main site requires caution. Across the lake, the former railway right-of-way has been converted to the Kettle Valley Rail Trail segment of the Trans Canada Trail, which runs along the eastern shore. Fishing, canoeing, kayaking, and waterskiing are popular on the lake. Although a small beach at the campground is suitable for swimming, the day-use area in Tulameen is preferable.
