= Olivine Creek =

Creek in the Similkameen region of British Columbia, Canada

Coordinates: 49°32′N 120°49′W

Olivine Creek is a creek located in the Similkameen region of British Columbia. The creek flows into the Tulameen River from the south side. Olivine Creek is located about 3 miles up the river from the village of Tulameen, British Columbia. Olivine Creek was originally called Slate Creek. The Creek was discovered in 1885 and mined for gold and platinum.
