= Britton Creek =

Tributary of the Tulameen River in British Columbia, Canada

Coordinates: 49°31′54″N 120°5′37″W

Britton Creek is a tributary of the Tulameen River in British Columbia, Canada. This creek is 8 miles (13 km) southwest of the old town of Tulameen. Britton Creek is located in a region of British Columbia called the Similkameen. The creek can be reached by road. Britton Creek was originally known as Eagle Creek. It was discovered in 1885 when gold was recovered from the creek. The gold was mainly close to the mouth of the creek. The creek also yielded placer platinum. The last great find was by Garnet Sootheran in 1926. Garnet discovered platinum and gold placer. According to historian Bill Barlee there may still be gold in the creek
