= Lawless =

Lawless may refer to:

== Arts and entertainment ==
- Lawless (British TV series), a 2004 TV miniseries starring Trevor Eve as John Paxton
- Lawless (2012 film), an American film directed by John Hillcoat
- Lawless (American TV series), a 1997 TV series starring Brian Bosworth as John Lawless
- Lawless (1999 film), a New Zealand TV film starring Kevin Smith
- The Lawless (novel), a 1978 novel by John Jakes
- The Lawless, a 1950 drama film
- Tracy Lawless, a main character in the comic book series Criminal
- "The Lawless" (Star Wars: The Clone Wars)

== Other uses ==
- Lawless: How the Supreme Court Came to Run on Conservative Grievance, Fringe Theories, and... Bad Vibes, a book by Leah Litman
- Lawless (surname)
- Lawless Creek, a creek in British Columbia, Canada

== See also ==
- Lawlessness
