= Tulameen =

Tulameen Stulameen
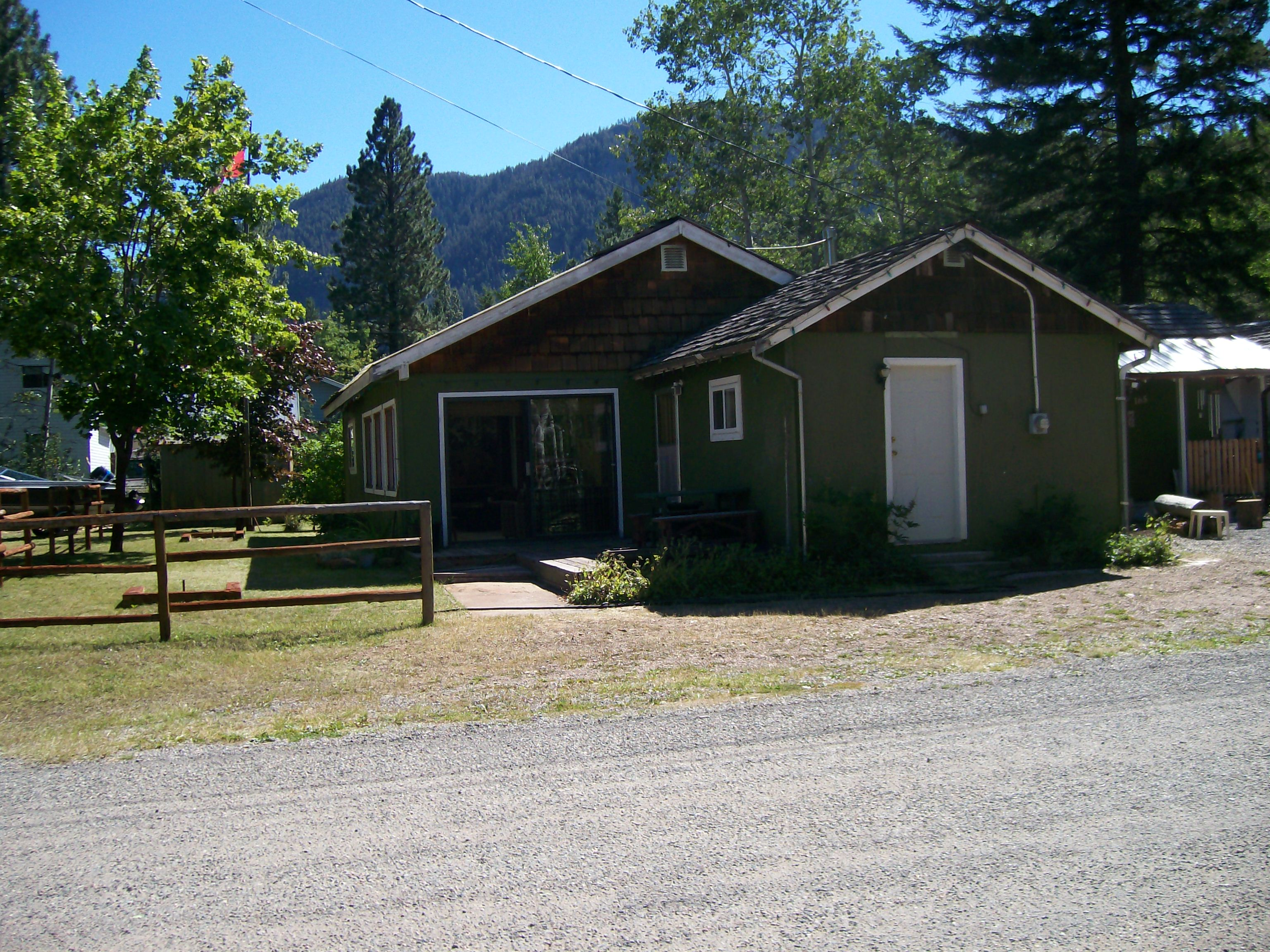
- House in Tulameen

- Location of Tulameen in British Columbia
- Coordinates: 49°32′44″N 120°45′34″W
- Country: Canada
- Province: British Columbia
- Region: Similkameen Country
- Regional District: Okanagan-Similkameen
- Elevation: 783 m (2,569 ft)

Population
  - Total: 200
- Postal code: V0X 1W0
- Area codes: 250, 778, 236, & 672

Tulameen is an unincorporated community in the Similkameen region of south central British Columbia, Canada. On the lee side of the Canadian Cascades, the village is north of the Tulameen River, west of Otter Creek, and at the foot of Otter Lake. On Coalmont Rd, the place is by road about 84 kilometres (52 mi) south of Merritt and 27 kilometres (17 mi) northwest of Princeton.

== Name origin ==
Initially called Otter Flat, the location was later renamed after the river, which was originally designated as the north fork of the Similkameen River by the Hudson's Bay Company (HBC) but as Tulameen by First Nations. Tulameen means "red earth", referring to the large deposits of red ochre in the valley. First Nations used this for dyeing fabrics and for war paint.

== History ==
=== Fur trade era ===
Campement des Femmes (Woman's Camp), opposite the mouth of Collins Gulch, was where the First Nations men left the women and children when they went on the summer hunt or to battle. Likewise, the men stayed behind when the women went berry picking.

Before the signing of the Oregon Treaty in 1846, Alexander Caulfield Anderson surveyed alternative routes to the coast. Following First Nations trails from Otter Lake, he took the longer one in 1846 but the shorter one was adopted in 1849 as part of the Hudson's Bay Brigade Trail. Campement des Femmes became one of the five HBC stopping places on the journey between Hope and Otter Lake.

The remains of the former fort were still visible over 50 years later.

In 1958, a cairn was erected at the site of the former Campement des Femmes and HBC fort.

=== Pioneer itinerants and settlers ===
By 1886, prospectors had created quite a township at Otter Flat, where a new sawmill provided building material. Infrastructure comprised two stores, two saloons, a branch post office, news depot, and bakery. That year, the province reserved 65 hectares (160 acres) for a future townsite, and Thomas Rabbitt opened the second store, but two years later, moved to Slate Creek, which at the time was closer to the main mining activity.

By 1891, Otter Flat was described as the remains of a good sized mining town. Early that decade, Jack Thynne established a ranch to the west, which was a stop on the Merritt–Princeton stage route. During the sawmill relocation to Granite Creek in 1895, the transporting raft rocked, and the equipment plunged into the Tulameen. In 1896, the bridge across Otter Creek was replaced.

By 1900, hard-rock and placer mining were well established in the area.

In 1974, 99-year-old Euphemia Rabbitt, the matriarch of Tulameen, died. Her late husband Thomas is remembered in the names of Rabbitt Creek and Mount Rabbitt.

=== Rebirthed community ===
In 1900, DeBarro and Thynne opened the Otter Flat Hotel primarily as a fishing and hunting resort. In 1901, the government surveyed a townsite on the 65-hectare (160-acre) reserve. John H. Jackson accessed his ranch across the Tulameen by boat but also installed a rope across the river to aid travellers crossing during high water. That May, Eastwood Smith & Co opened a store. A June advertisement for the government auction of townsite lots was the earliest newspaper mention of the new official name of Tulameen. Until the later 1920s, the name Tulameen City was also often used for the location and Otter Flat for the general area. The July 1901 auction generated the sale of 55 lots.

In 1903, DeBarro and Thynne dissolved their partnership. The Otter Creek bridge, which burned in 1904, was soon repaired. In 1906, Charlie DeBarro sold the Otter Flat hotel to W.J. Henderson. The Eastwood store having closed, the premises were leased by H.L. Roberts, who proposed to reopen as a general store. Whether the opening of the J.H. Jackson store affected these plans is unclear. Jackson was the inaugural postmaster 1907–1910. Also, that year, the Swedenmark sawmill opened. Following the erection of an addition to the hotel, a grand reopening occurred in early 1908. That year, the school opened in a log cabin, before the new schoolhouse was built. In 1909, Donald McRae began erecting his three-storey hotel, named the Dominion, which was completed in 1911.

Census population: Tulameen
Year	Pop.	±%
1961	112	—
1966	90	−19.6%
1971	74	−17.8%
1976	130	+75.7%
1981	133	+2.3%
1986	117	−12.0%
1991	178	+52.1%
1996		—
2001	136	—
2006	115	−15.4%

In 1911, James Schubert purchased the store owned by J.H. Jackson. At that time, Otter Flat remained the common name for the community. In 1913, W.S. Garrison bought the livery, stage business, and barn from Jackson. Squatters, who had erected buildings on public land, were given 30 days notice to remove them. Replaced by train service, the stage from Coalmont via Tulameen to Merritt ceased in 1916. McRae closed his hotel in 1917, and fire destroyed the long closed Otter Flat Hotel.

In 1922, the Campbell store burned down. In 1924, an ice jam caused flooding of the Schubert store and other buildings. About this time, Britton hall was erected for social events. In 1927, the Dominion Hotel reopened after a 10-year closure. In 1928, A.E. Whish purchased the Schubert store.

The relaunch of the Dominion Hotel appears short lived, because the contents were sold in 1936. That year, a new one-room school building was erected.

In 1940, placer mining activity increased.

In 1958, the centennial celebration was held, and the original log school building was moved to the elementary school grounds.

In 1963, BC Hydro transmission lines arrived, and Otter Lake Park was established.

== Railway ==
In 1931, a 4-metre (13 ft) high log loading platform was installed at the station.

In 1991, the remainder of the abandoned track southeast of Spences Bridges was lifted.

Lying to the east, the former railway right-of-way has been converted to the Kettle Valley Rail Trail segment of the Trans Canada Trail. Following the 2021 Pacific Northwest floods, at least five washouts of the trail between Princeton and Tulameen require extensive reconstruction.

== Forestry ==
In 1910, the Tulameen Lumber Co was established. That year, Columbia Coal and Coke purchased the sawmill to provide lumber for construction activities at Coalmont and the mine.

In 1942, Tulameen Sawmills was established. From 1947, the Squelch and Son mill was producing rough lumber. In 1949, a sawdust fire was contained.

Logging dominated the local economy. During the 1950s, the Squelch mill was the main industry for the community. In 1959, strong winds almost blew apart the tie and planing mill at Manning.

A National Forest Products mill operated at Tulameen in the early 1960s.

== Notable people ==
- James Rabbitt, (1941– ), politician, resident.

== Later community ==
In 2000–01, the original log school building was dismantled, the roof and rotten logs replaced, a door and windows added, and the structure reassembled behind the library. The Tulameen Days held on the August long weekend experienced violence with a stabbing in 2000 and a crowd threatening police with beer bottle projectiles in 2017. The school closed in 2006.

In 2012, high water flooded residential basements. The next year, the Coalmont Energy coalmine containment pond at Collins Gulch breached, releasing 30,000 litres; 7,800 US gallons (6,500 imp gal) of coal slurry into the river. Months later, the covered ice rink opened.

During the 2021 Pacific Northwest floods, some houses were flooded, the community hall housed victims, and groceries were helicoptered into the community of about 200 permanent residents, which lacks cellphone coverage.

In summertime, over 100 seasonal residents augment the population.

The Trading Post comprises a general store, restaurant, post office, and gas bar. Other local services include a small motel, community centre, volunteer fire department, and Ski-doo dealer and repair centre.

One public and two private cemeteries exist.

== See also ==
Lawless Creek
