= Lockie Creek =

Creek in the Similkameen region of British Columbia, Canada

Coordinates: 49°35′N 120°46′W

Lockie Creek is a creek located in the Similkameen region of British Columbia, Canada. This creek is on the west side of Otter Lake, British Columbia. Originally called Boulder Creek, the creek was mined for gold in the 1800s. Platinum was also found. In 1887, a Chinese worker unearthed a gold nugget weighing about 4 troy pounds and valued at $900. This was the largest nugget recovered from the Similkameen-Tulameen district. The nugget was kept a secret until it was sold to Wells, Fargo and Co.. The nugget was placed on exhibition in their bank located in Victoria, British Columbia.
