= Otter Lake, British Columbia =

Lake in British Columbia, Canada

Otter Lake
- Location within British Columbia
- Location: Tulameen, British Columbia Canada
- Coordinates: 49°34′42″N 120°45′59″W
- Primary inflows: Lockie Creek, Otter Creek
- Primary outflows: Otter Creek
- Basin countries: Canada
- Max. length: 5 km (3 mi)
- Surface area: 204 ha (504 acres)
- Average depth: 14 m (46 ft)
- Max. depth: 26 m (85 ft)
- Shore length^{1}: 13 km (8 mi)
- Surface elevation: 786 m (2,579 ft)
- ^{1} Shore length is not a well-defined measure.

Otter Lake is immediately north of Tulameen in the Similkameen region of south central British Columbia, Canada. Accessed via Coalmont Rd, which borders the western shore, the northern tip is by road about 78 kilometres (48 mi) south of Merritt and the southern tip is about 27 kilometres (17 mi) northwest of Princeton.

== Profile ==
Often called Tulameen Lake, the official name is Otter Lake, indicating the noticeable presence of otters. The length is about 5 kilometres (3 mi). The surface area is 203.8 hectares (503.6 acres) and elevation is 786 metres (2,579 ft) above sea level. The mean depth is 14 metres (46 ft) and maximum depth is 26 metres (85 ft). The shoreline is 12.6 kilometres (7.8 mi).

== Fur trade and pioneer era ==
The earliest written mention of the lake was in the reports of Alexander Caulfield Anderson. While surveying possible Hudson's Bay Brigade Trail routes between the Hudson's Bay Company (HBC) forts at Kamloops and Hope, he was welcomed by First Nations Chief Blackeye at the lake and his party served a carp dinner.

== Ice harvesting ==
In 1915, a 120-metre (400 ft) ice loading conveyor was installed at the lake. Handling up to 2,700 tonnes (3,000 short tons) a day, the conveyor could be used to load 16 boxcars simultaneously. Associated infrastructure included a bunkhouse, dining room, kitchen, engine room, and horse barn. Each winter until 1925, 15-by-30-metre (50 by 100 ft) blocks of ice were cut from the lake to be used for refrigeration. Special Great Northern Railway (GN) trains ran at all hours to Oroville, Washington, from where the ice was distributed to GN facilities. A single steam locomotive could haul the average 60-car trains because of the steady downhill grade to Oroville. In 1921, the season volume peaked at 2,300 loaded boxcars. When modern refrigeration ended the need for such ice, this infrastructure was dismantled in 1926.

== Fishing ==
In 1900, DeBarro and Thynne opened the Otter Flat Hotel at Otter Flat primarily as a resort for fishing, hunting, and boating, on the lake. In 1910, a 6-metre (21 ft) gasoline launch was placed upon the lake.

In 1923, stocking of the lake with trout spawn began. Nowadays, Summerland Trout Hatchery stocks the lake with rainbow trout fry to provide excellent sport fishing opportunities. Ice fishing is possible on the lake in wintertime.

== Camping and picnics ==
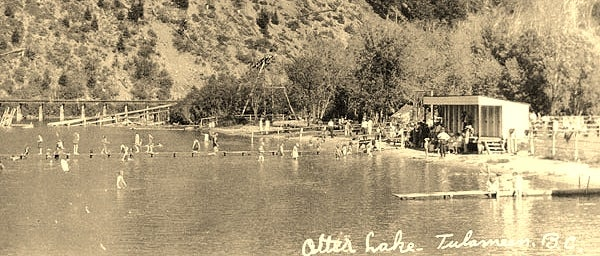
Otter Lake, Tulameen, c.1925

In the early 1920s, John Hosey purchased a site on the lakeshore, cleared the underbrush, installed a cookhouse, picnic tables, changing stalls, boardwalk, and high diving tower, and opened a small refreshments store. The venue soon proved popular with visitors and improvements were added over the years. In 1929, new owners took over this cabin and camping enterprise.

Over subsequent decades, various organizations held picnics at the lake. In recent decades, the Otter Lake Park has catered to picnics and camping. The smaller picnic and day-use area is at Tulameen and the lakeside campground in the main park is about 5 kilometres (3 mi) farther north along the road.

== See also ==
- List of lakes of British Columbia
