= Olivine (disambiguation) =

Olivine is a mineral (a solid solution series) and a mineral group.

Olivine may also refer to:

- Olivine, colour
- Olivine Creek, in British Columbia
- Olivine Point, in the South Orkney Islands
- Olivine River, in New Zealand
