= Saturday Creek =

Creek in the Similkameen region of British Columbia, Canada

Coordinates: 49°17′N 120°33′W

Saturday Creek is a creek located in the Similkameen region of British Columbia. The creek flows into the Similkameen River from the west. Saturday Creek is located about 15 miles (24 km) from Princeton, British Columbia. The creek has been mined for gold.
