= Surprise City =

- Location of Surprise City in British Columbia
- Coordinates: 59°38′00″N 133°25′00″W
- Country: Canada
- Province: British Columbia

Surprise (in full: Surprise City) is a ghost town located in the Atlin Country Region of British Columbia. Surprise City is located on Otter Creek near the southwest end of Surprise Lake. Surprise City is also known as Otter Creek. The city existed to support the gold mining operations in the area.
