= Blakeburn =

- Location of Blakeburn in British Columbia
- Coordinates: 49°28′54″N 120°44′09″W
- Country: Canada
- Province: British Columbia
- Region: Similkameen Country
- Regional District: Okanagan-Similkameen

Blakeburn is an abandoned locality in the Similkameen region of south central British Columbia, Canada. The former coal mining community is by road about 8 kilometres (5 mi) southwest of Coalmont.

In 1920, the aerial tramway at Boundary Falls was dismantled and transported to Coalmont, where a 4-kilometre (13,110 ft) tramway was installed for connecting the mine site with the Coalmont tipple for shipping by rail. By 1922, the mine site was called Blakeburn after the principals. The largest shareholders in Coalmont Collieries were William John "Blake" Wilson and his employer Patrick Burns at P. Burns & Co., meat packers.

When the colliery closed in 1940, the aerial tramway and other equipment were dismantled and sold.

== See also ==
- List of ghost towns in British Columbia
