= Lake Otis (Florida) =

- Location within Florida Location within the United States
- Location: Winter Haven, Florida
- Coordinates: 28.011°N 81.7106°W
- Type: natural freshwater lake
- Basin countries: United States
- Max. length: 4,855 feet (1,480 m)
- Max. width: 2,145 feet (654 m)
- Surface area: 144 acres (58 ha)
- Average depth: 12.2 feet (3.7 m)
- Max. depth: 34.5 feet (10.5 m)
- Surface elevation: 128 feet (39 m)

Lake Otis is a natural freshwater lake located on the east side of Winter Haven, Florida. The Polk County Water Atlas says the lake sometimes is known as Little Otis, but this is confirmed nowhere else. The main part of the lake is somewhat rectangular in shape and on the south side of the main section of the lake is a long tail-shaped cove. Lake Otis has a 144 acres (58 ha) surface. It is connected on its northeast side to nearby Lake Link by a 50 feet (15 m) canal. This is the closest point between the two lakes. Other than where the shore where the two lakes are very close, Lake Otis is completely surrounded by residences. Lakewood Causeway runs between the two lakes. To the south of this area is a gated community that can be accessed by the public during the daytime. Most of the south cove is surrounded by another gated community and the public is prevented from entering it by gates that are closed all the time.

Lake Otis has no public boat ramps or swimming areas. In fact, there are no areas of the shore accessible to the public. The entire shore of the lake, other than the area near Lake Link, has steep banks. The Hook and Bullet website, however, says Lake Otis contains largemouth bass, bluegill and crappie.
