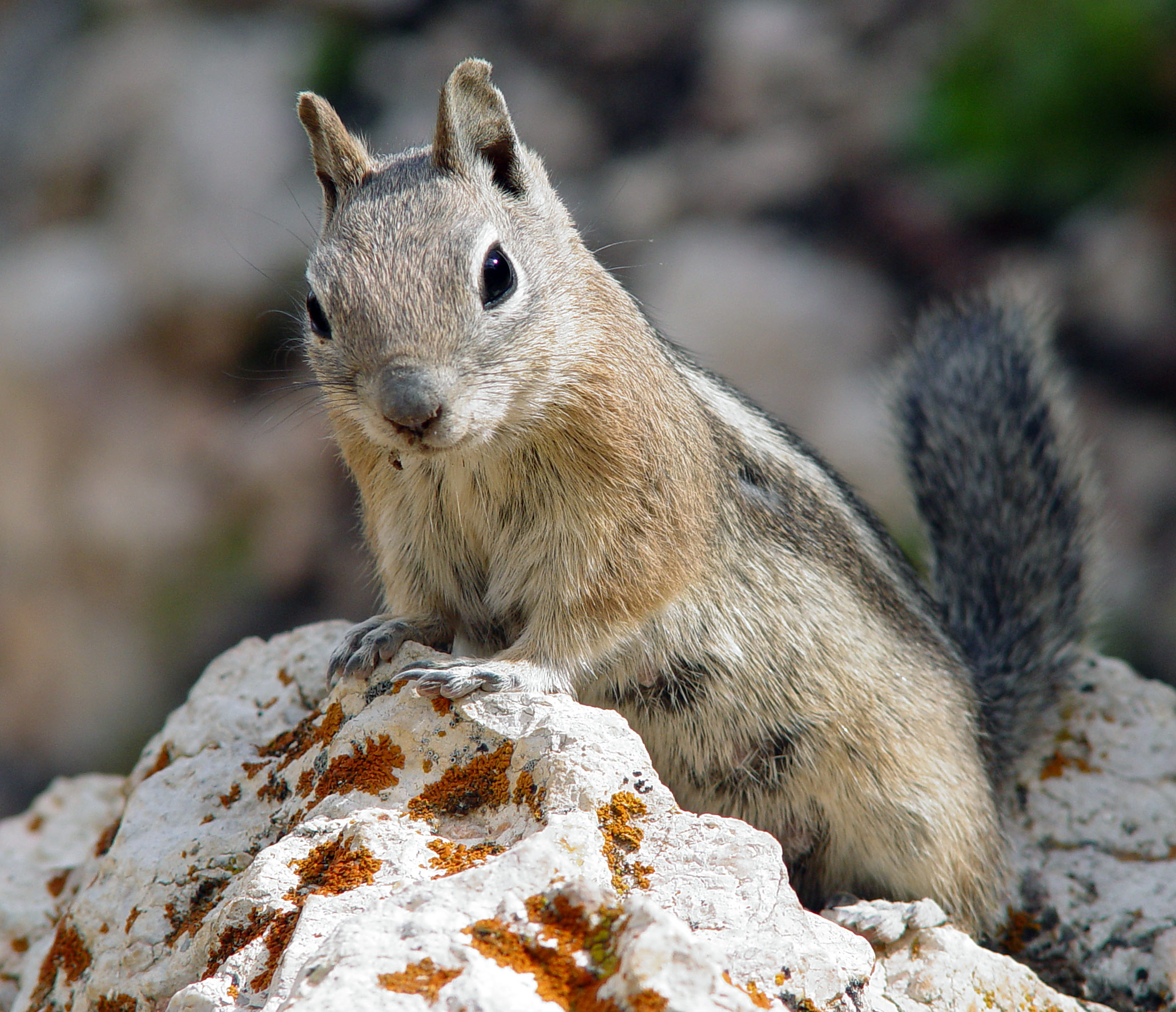
- Golden-mantled ground squirrel (Callospermophilus lateralis)

Scientific classification
- Domain: Eukaryota
- Kingdom: Animalia
- Phylum: Chordata
- Class: Mammalia
- Order: Rodentia
- Family: Sciuridae
- Tribe: Marmotini
- Genus: Callospermophilus; Merriam, 1897

Type species
- Sciurus lateralis Say, 1823

= Callospermophilus =

Genus of rodents

Callospermophilus is a genus of ground squirrel from North America.

== Etymology ==
Callospermophilus: gr. καλλος kallos – beauty, from καλος kalos – beautiful; genus Spermophilus F. Cuvier, 1825

== Species ==
The genus contains three species:

Image	Name	Distribution
	Golden-mantled ground squirrel (C. lateralis)	western North America.
	Sierra Madre ground squirrel (C. madrensis)	Sierra Madre Occidental, in northern Mexico.
	Cascade golden-mantled ground squirrel (C. saturatus)	province of British Columbia, Canada and the state of Washington, United States
