= Granite Creek (British Columbia) =

Creek and townsite in the Similkameen region of British Columbia, Canada

Coordinates: 49°30′N 120°41′W

Granite Creek is a creek and townsite in British Columbia located in the Similkameen region. Granite Creek flows north into the Tulameen River and joins that river approximately one and a half miles to the east of Coalmont, British Columbia. It is assumed Granite Creek yielded more than $500,000 in placer gold since its discovery. Gold nuggets worth $50 in value were not unusual in the early years. The creek was mined by Europeans and Chinese. Granite Creek was hydraulicked near its mouth in the 1890s.

Most historical accounts claim gold on the creek was discovered in 1885 by a rustler by the name of Johnny Chance. Johnny Chance stumbled upon placer gold in Granite Creek. Another historical account indicates Granite Creek was discovered in the fall of 1884 by Briggs, Bromley and a third partner. A stampede of miners headed towards Granite Creek and at the confluence of the Tulameen River, they created a mining camp. The camp grew and soon was also known as Granite Creek, British Columbia. The mining boom lasted only about a decade as yield from the creeks dwindled. By 1915, Granite Creek (the town) ceased to exist.
