= Hayes Creek (British Columbia) =

Creek in the Similkameen region of British Columbia, Canada

Coordinates: 49°28′N 120°22′W

Hayes Creek is a creek in the Similkameen region of British Columbia. Hayes Creek used to be called Five Mile Creek. The creek flows south into the Similkameen River, five miles east of Princeton, British Columbia. The creek was discovered in 1887 and mined for gold.
