= Granite Creek townsite, British Columbia =

British Columbian ghost town

"Granite City" is the informal name for the mining settlement located near Granite Creek. Established during the 1885 gold rush, Granite Creek townsite is now a ghost town in the Similkameen region of British Columbia, Canada.

== Early years ==
A cowboy and sometimes prospector named Johnny Chance discovered gold in Granite Creek in 1885. The discovery of gold led to the creation of a mining settlement, sometimes informally called "Granite City", in 1885. The federal Post Office named "Granite Creek" was opened on May 1, 1886. It remained open with only one temporary closure, until March 31, 1918. Granite Creek lay deep in the remote Tulameen country of southern British Columbia. By 1886 Granite Creek contained 300 European prospectors and 100 Chinese. On April 21, 1886 the newspaper called the Victoria Colonist reported Granite City(sic) had "9 general stores, 14 hotels and restaurants,2 jewelers,3 bakers, 3 blacksmiths, 2 livery stables, a shoemaker, butcher, chemist, attorney, doctor and 8 pack trains owned in the city. 200 buildings occupy the two main streets - Government and Granite." | year = 1885,1886,1887. Annual report of the Minister of Mines. Granite Creek was mistakenly regarded as one of the largest cities in British Columbia. The town never contained a school, church nor a local governing body. The jail did not have bars on the windows. The windows were one foot square.

Gold production dropped sharply by 1889 causing many people to leave, and there was a major fire on April 4, 1907. Granite nevertheless survived for some years after that. In 1910 Columbia Coal and Coke Company opened their offices there, but with the building of Coalmont in 1912 there was less reason for the town to exist. Still, the Granite Creek Post Office didn't close until March 31, 1918. Over the next few decades Granite Creek became slowly abandoned and eventually overgrown but there were still people living there in 1925.

== The 1930s ==
By 1915 the gold rush was over and Granite Creek lay deserted. The depression of the 1930s brought drifters to Granite Creek area hoping to eke out a living on the placer gold creeks of the past. By the time the depression came to an end only a handful of miners lived at what was the former gold rush boom town called Granite Creek. By the 1960s the last of these miners in Granite Creek had passed on and the townsite became a ghost town of British Columbia. Only a very few partial log buildings stand on the original site.

== Lost platinum cache ==
British Columbia Historian Bill Barlee reports the story of a Scandinavian by the name of Johanssen. Johanssen recovered a reported 300 ounces of platinum from Granite Creek, British Columbia and is reported to have buried his cache of platinum in a bucket south of his cabin, somewhere visible from the cabin door. Granite City was destroyed by a fire in 1907, and Johanssen's cabin was levelled. With the cabin lost so was the location as to where the cache was. The platinum cache is reported to still be there, close to $50,000 in platinum buried somewhere in Granite City. This legend should be lightly regarded as, other than N.L. Barlee's story, there is no evidence supporting this legend.

== In pop culture ==
Granite Creek was featured on Season 1, Episode 11 of the historical television series Gold Trails and Ghost Towns.
