= Granite Creek (Black Rock Desert) =

Stream in Nevada, U.S.

Coordinates: 40°47′41″N 119°18′09″W

Granite Creek is a stream in the U.S. state of Nevada.

Granite Creek was so named on account of granite outcroppings near its course.
