= Lake Link (Florida) =

- Location within Florida Location within the United States
- Location: Winter Haven, Florida
- Coordinates: 28.0178°N 81.7061°W
- Type: natural freshwater lake
- Basin countries: United States
- Max. length: 1,190 feet (360 m)
- Max. width: 1,190 feet (360 m)
- Surface area: 26.17 acres (11 ha)
- Surface elevation: 128 feet (39 m)

Lake Link is a circular natural freshwater lake on the east side of Winter Haven, Florida. It has a 26.17-acre (105,900 m^{2}) surface area and is surrounded on all but the southwest sides by residences. A 50 feet (15 m) canal connects it there to Lake Otis, a much larger lake. On the southwest Lakewood Causeway separates Lake Otis and Lake Link. Other than a short bridge, Lakewood Causeway is a land route.

There is no public access to Lake Link, so no boating or fishing can be done without permission of adjacent landowners. However, the Hook and Bullet website says this lake contains largemouth bass, bluegill and crappie.
