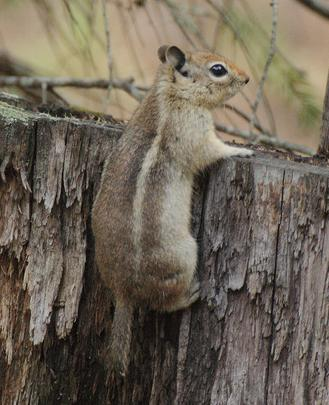

Conservation status
- Near Threatened (IUCN 3.1)

Scientific classification
- Kingdom: Animalia
- Phylum: Chordata
- Class: Mammalia
- Order: Rodentia
- Family: Sciuridae
- Genus: Callospermophilus
- Species: C. madrensis

Binomial name
- Callospermophilus madrensis Merriam, 1901
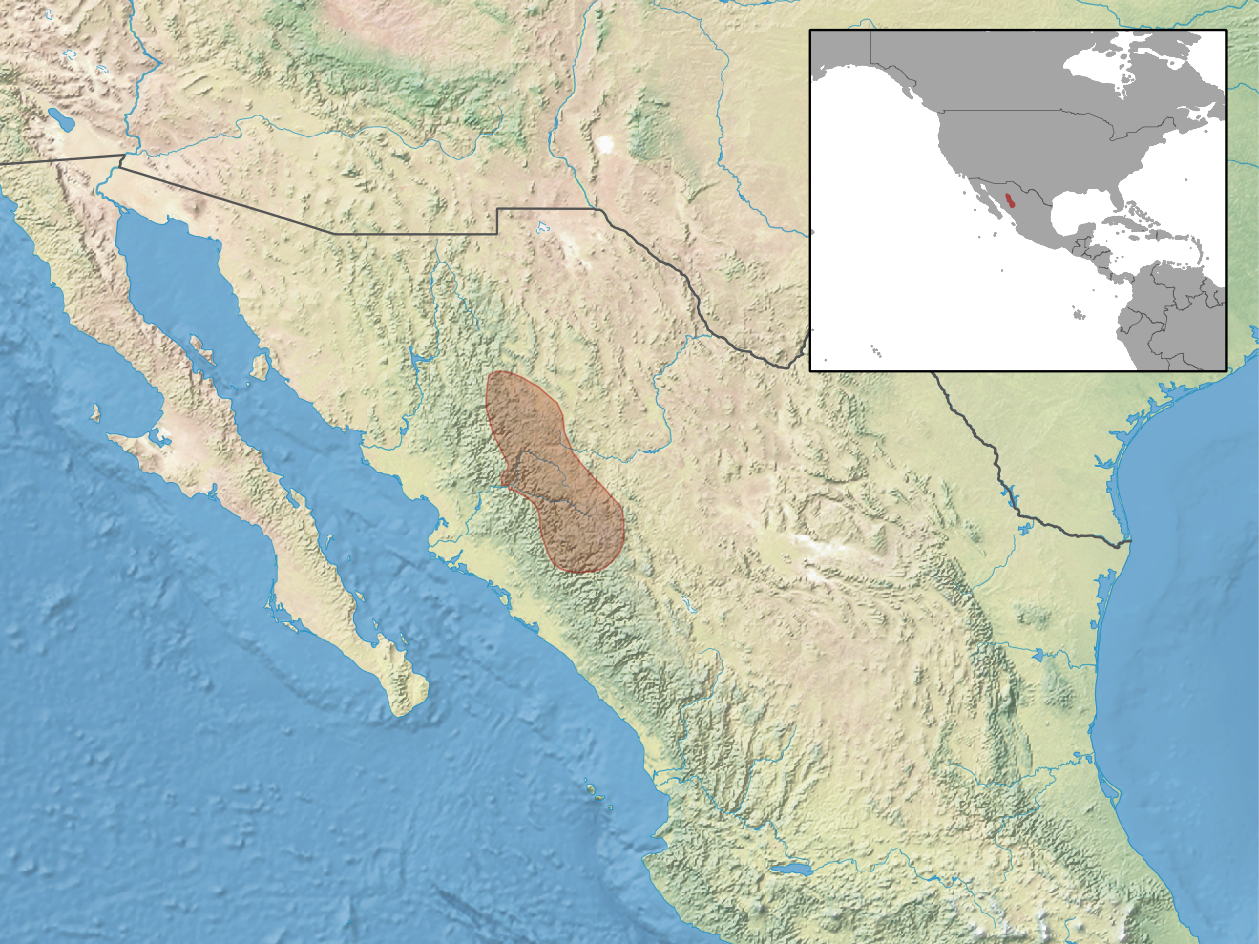

Synonyms
- Spermophilus madrensis

= Sierra Madre ground squirrel =

Species of rodent

The Sierra Madre ground squirrel (Callospermophilus madrensis) is a species of rodent in the squirrel family. It is endemic to the Sierra Madre Occidental, in northern Mexico. Its natural habitat is subtropical or tropical dry lowland grassland.

== See also ==
- Ground squirrels
