= Golden-mantled ground squirrel =

- Callospermophilus lateralis tescorum Banff National Park, Alberta, Canada

Conservation status
- Least Concern (IUCN 3.1)

Scientific classification
- Kingdom: Animalia
- Phylum: Chordata
- Class: Mammalia
- Order: Rodentia
- Family: Sciuridae
- Genus: Callospermophilus
- Species: C. lateralis

Binomial name
- Callospermophilus lateralis (Say, 1823)
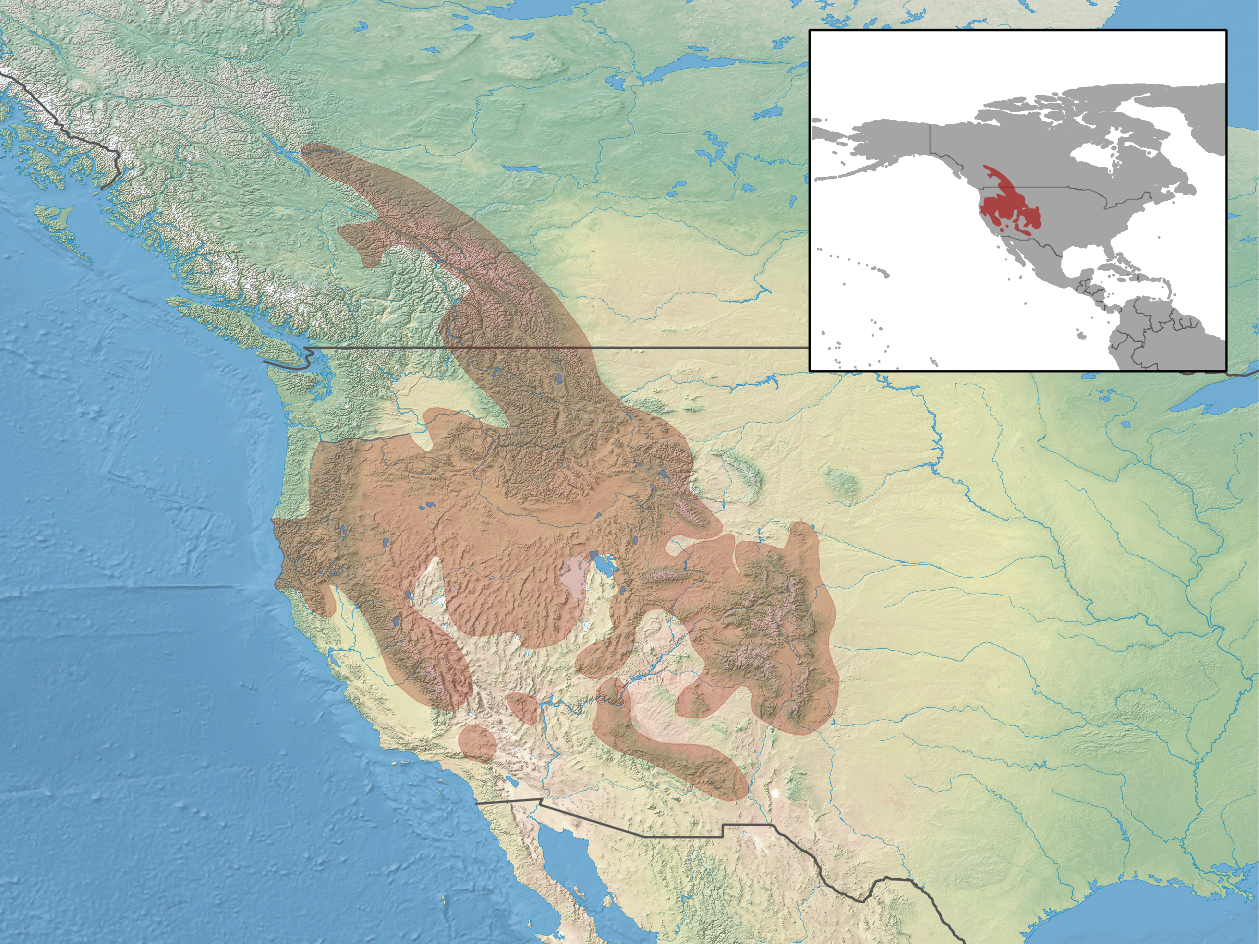

Synonyms
- Spermophilus lateralis

Species of rodent

The golden-mantled ground squirrel (Callospermophilus lateralis) is a ground squirrel native to western North America. It is distributed in the Rocky Mountains of British Columbia and Alberta, and through much of the western United States.

== Description ==
This ground squirrel is generally about 23 to 29 cm (9.1 to 11.4 in) in length. The weight range for adults is between 120 and 394 grams (0.26 to 0.86 lbs.) It has whitish or yellow-gray underparts. The tail is brown to black with buff edges and a yellowish to reddish underside. It has pale rings around the eyes. The "mantle" across the shoulders is tawny to reddish, with males having a deeper reddish tinge. This species is distinguished from similar ground squirrels by a black-bordered white stripe down each side of the back and is distinguished from similar looking chipmunks by its lack of facial stripes.

Some authors describe many subspecies of this taxon.

Rocky Mountain golden-mantled ground squirrel, C. l. tescorum
feeding, Banff National Park, Alberta

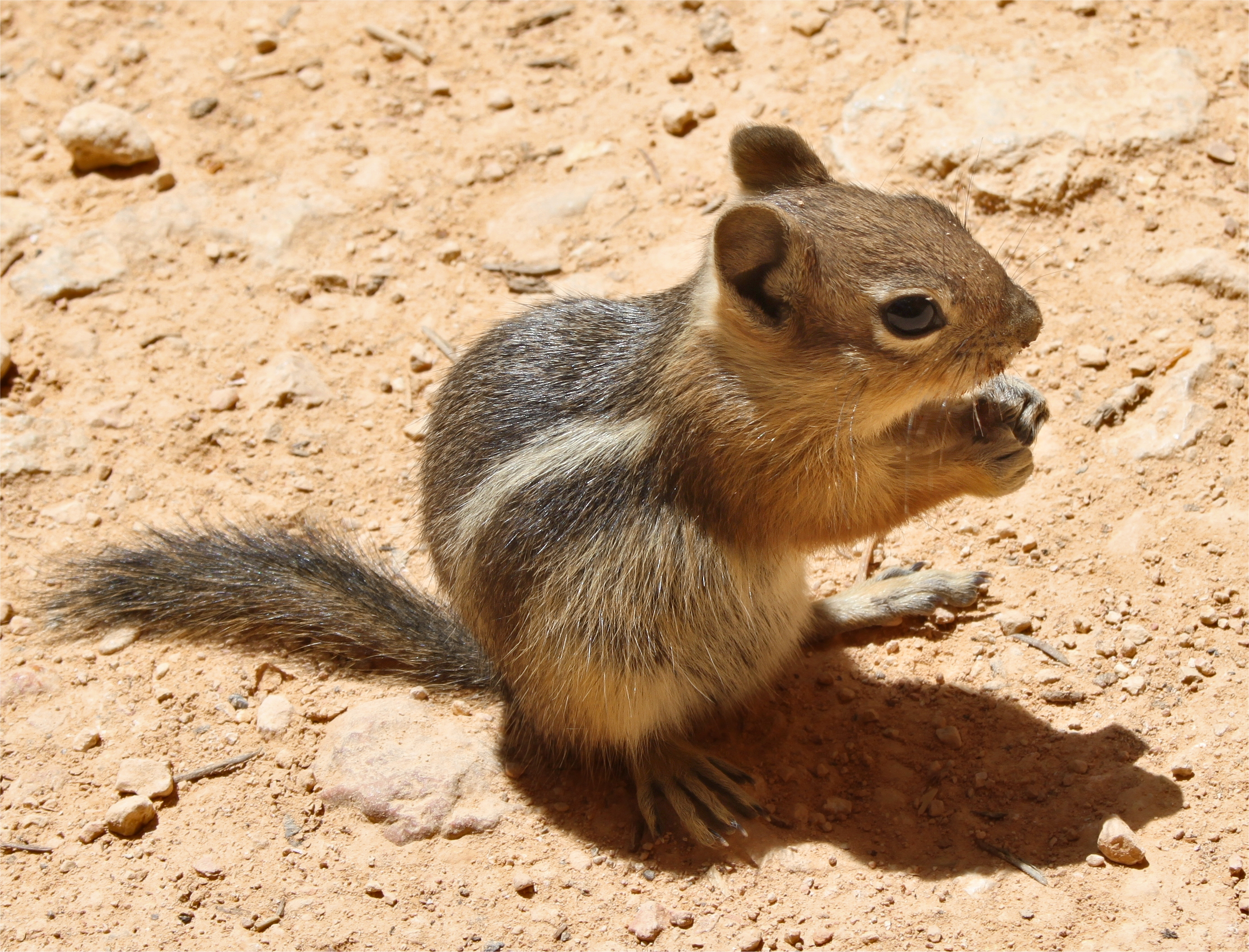
Utah golden-mantled squirrel
C. l. castanurus
Bryce Canyon, Utah

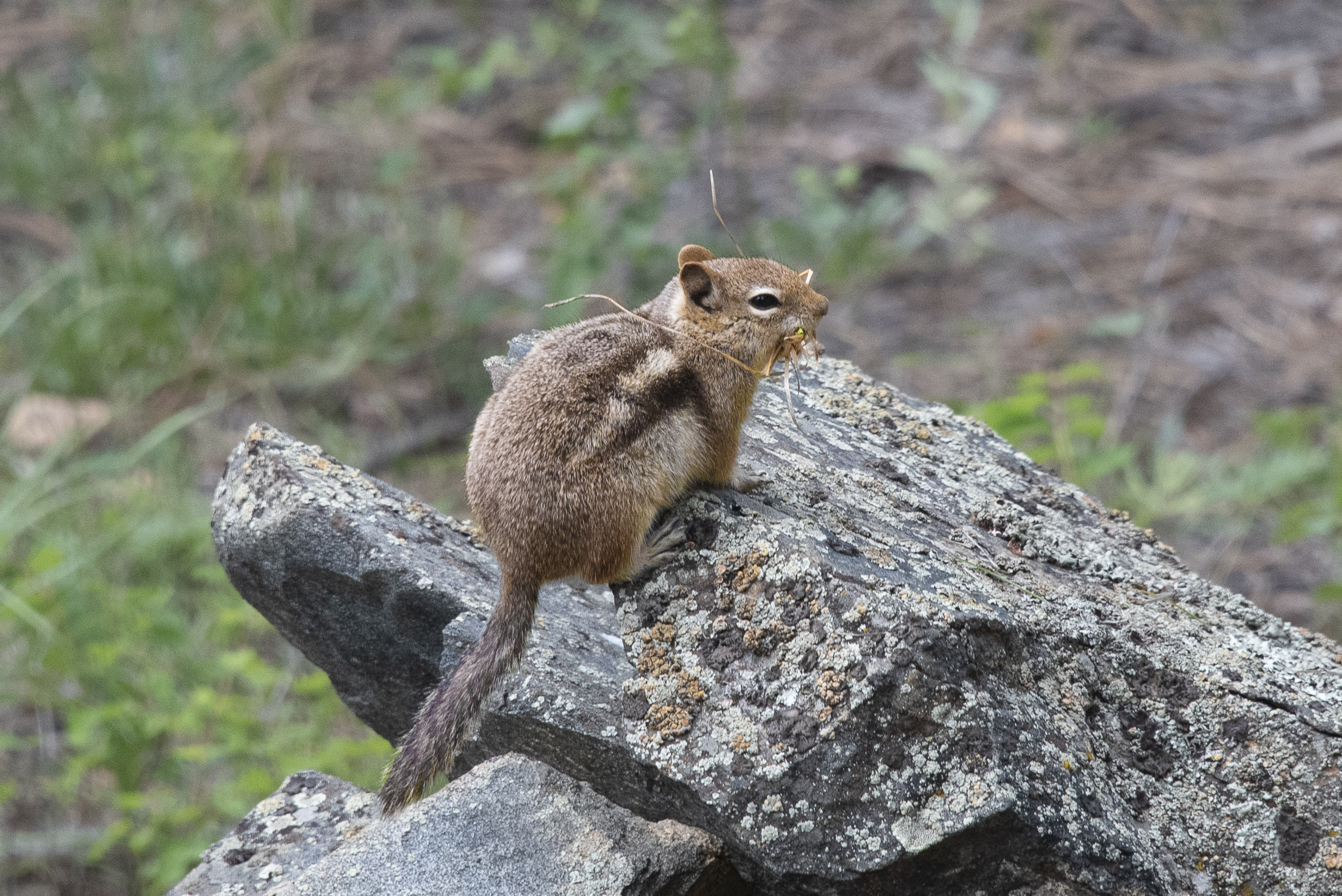
Golden-mantled ground squirrel
C. l. lateralis
gathering vegetation, Colorado

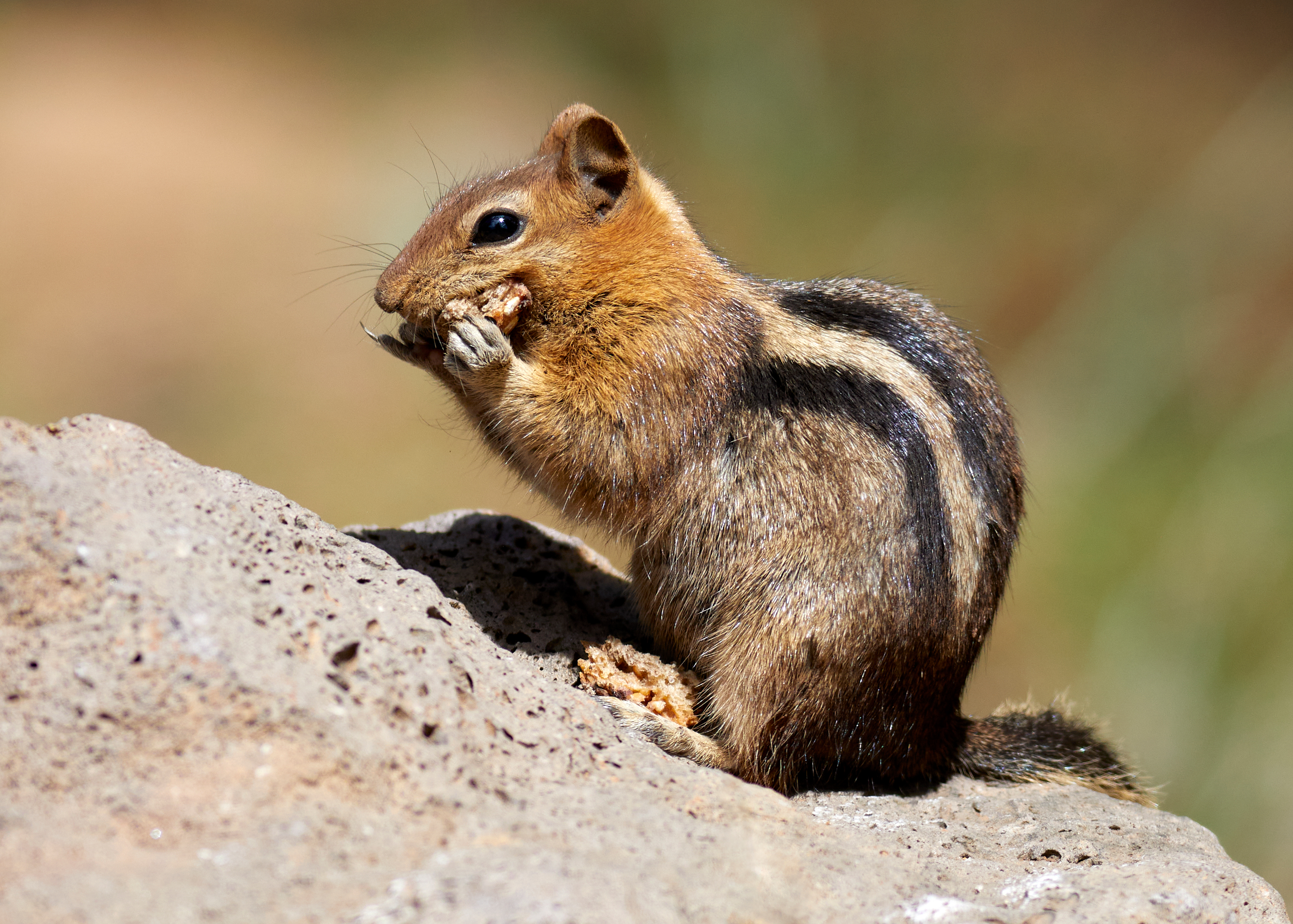
Sierra golden-mantled ground squirrel, C. l. chrysodeirus
feeding, Lake Almanor, California

== Biology and ecology ==
This species occurs in forests, chaparral, meadow margins, and sagebrush, especially in areas with many rocks or forest litter that provides shelter. It is associated with many kinds of coniferous trees, aspen, and manzanita.

It is omnivorous, feeding on pine nuts, acorns, herbs and shrubs, fungi, many kinds of insects, eggs, young birds, lizards, carrion, and human foods when available. This species caches food near its burrow, especially during the late summer and fall. The squirrel has also been known to "beg" for human food at the wildlife urban interface.

This species hibernates over the winter. During the summers they gain extra weight in order to prepare for hibernation. The squirrels hibernate in dens that can reach up to 100 feet in length although they are typically shallow in depth. The breeding season commences when males and females emerge from hibernation in the spring. Most broods are born in July. A female has two to eight young per litter, with an average of five. There is no paternal care of the offspring. Juveniles resemble adults by 40 days of age. The life span of this ground squirrel is up to about seven years.

Most adults are independent, rarely cooperating, and usually competing for resources. They may assemble at sites with abundant food but develop a group hierarchy. Adults reside alone in burrows, creating nests for hibernation or rearing of young. This species has been known to nest in structures, such as roofs. This species becomes vocal when it feels threatened, making squeaking noises or growling. However, it is generally not a very vocal species.

Predators of this squirrel include snakes, foxes, weasels, and bears. It may carry the Rocky Mountain wood tick, a vector of Rocky Mountain spotted fever and other diseases.

== Conservation ==
This is a common and widespread species that is not considered to be threatened.
