= Otter Creek (British Columbia) =

Coordinates: 59°37′52″N 133°24′47″W

Otter Creek is a creek located in the Atlin Country region of British Columbia. This creek flows into the south side of Lake Surprise about 2 miles west of Wright Creek. Otter Creek was discovered in 1898. The creek has been mined and for some years Compagnie Francaise des Mines d'Or du Canada hydraulicked a number of leases along Otter Creek.
