= Tulameen River =

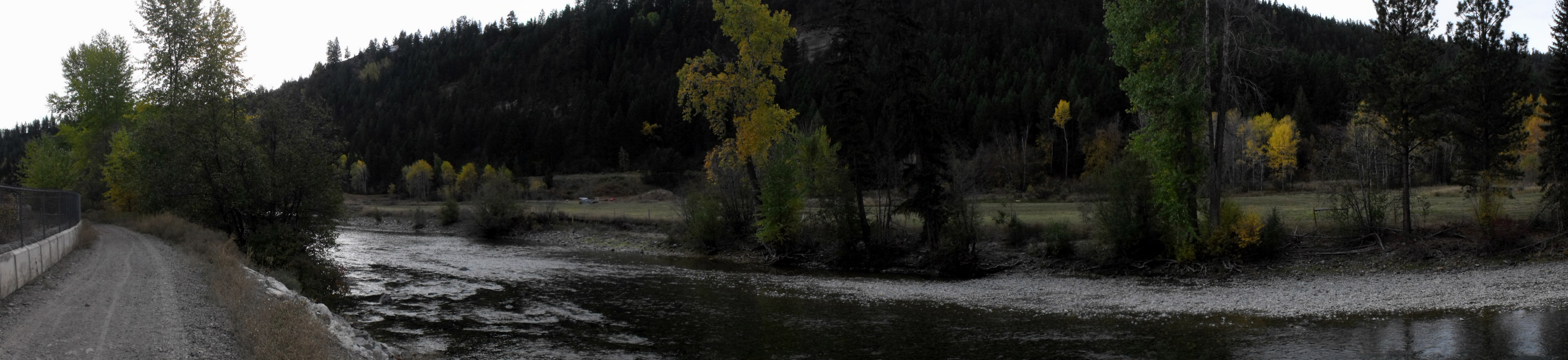
- Etymology: Nlaka'pamux for red earth

Location
- Country: Canada
- Province: British Columbia

Physical characteristics
- Source: North Cascades
- Mouth: Similkameen River
  - coordinates: 49°28′N 120°30′W
- Discharge
  - location: At Princeton
  - average: 21.8 m^{3}/s (770 cu ft/s)
  - minimum: 0.78 m^{3}/s (28 cu ft/s)
  - maximum: 374 m^{3}/s (13,200 cu ft/s)

The Tulameen River is a tributary of the Similkameen River in the Canadian province of British Columbia. The Tulameen River is part of the Columbia River drainage basin, being a tributary of the Similkameen River, which flows into the Okanagan River, which flows into the Columbia River.

== Course ==
The Tulameen River originates in E. C. Manning Provincial Park with headwaters at Punchbowl Lake, in the North Cascades part of the Cascade Range. it flows generally north then east, passing Tulameen, British Columbia before joining the Similkameen River at Princeton. It is the only place in the world where both gold and platinum can be found alongside each other, however all significant deposits have been mined.

Its tributaries include Britton Creek.

== Ecology ==
The watershed holds a number of diverse flora and fauna species. Fauna include mammals, amphibians, reptiles and birds. Among the amphibians of the watershed is the Rough-skinned newt, Taricha granulosa, whose populations in the North Cascades exhibit an adult perennibranchiate form in approximately 90 percent of the population.

== See also ==
- List of rivers of British Columbia
- Tributaries of the Columbia River

== Sources ==
- Fred W. Beckey. 1995. Cascade Alpine Guide: Rainy Pass to Fraser River, Published by The Mountaineers Books, ISBN 0-89886-423-2,
- C. Michael Hogan. 2008. Rough-skinned Newt (Taricha granulosa), Globaltwitcher, ed. Nicklas Stromberg
