= Similkameen Country =

Region in British Columbia, Canada

Coordinates: 49°13′00″N 119°58′00″W

The Similkameen Country, also referred to as the Lower Similkameen Valley or Similkameen District, but generally referred to simply as The Similkameen or more archaically, Similkameen, is a region roughly coinciding with the basin of the river of the same name in the Southern Interior of British Columbia. The term "Similkameen District" also refers to the Similkameen Mining District, a defunct government administrative district, which geographically encompasses the same area, and in more casual terms may also refer to the Similkameen electoral district, which was combined with the Grand Forks-Greenwood riding by the time of the 1966 election. The Similkameen Country has deep historical connections to the Boundary Country and the two are sometimes considered one region, partly as a result of the name of the electoral district. It is also sometimes classed as being part of the Okanagan region, which results from shared regional district and other administrative boundaries and names. The term "Similkameen District" may also historically refer to the Similkameen Division Yale Land District, which also includes Osoyoos and the Boundary Country to Osoyoos' east.

The name "Similkameen" is said to have originated from the Similkameigh indigenous people of the region, meaning "treacherous waters".

Although the Similkameen River's last few miles are in Washington state, only the British Columbia part of the river's basin is named "the Similkameen".

The Similkameen is one of several historical regions of British Columbia whose foundations and settlement lay in the days of the Colony of British Columbia, and was one of the first areas of the province prospected as well as farmed and ranched. The area has seen a number of famous gold strikes and large mining operations, notably the Tulameen Gold Rush of the 1880s and 1890s and the Nickel Plate Mine at Hedley, but also including coal at Blakeburn and Coalmont, and copper at Allenby and Copper Mountain, all of these locations in the vicinity of Princeton.

Orcharding and ranching are important to the Similkameen Country, with orcharding and ranching operations in the Keremeos first started by Bohemian immigrant Francis Xavier Richter in 1864. Richter's original 30 acres (120,000 m^{2}) of fruit trees at Keremeos Centre are considered to be one of the two foundations of BC's orcharding industry, the other being started by the Oblate Fathers at Okanagan Mission. Today, the area is seeing a burgeoning wine industry and a boom in sunbelt-oriented recreation housing and property development.

== Major towns ==
- Keremeos
- Princeton
- Tulameen
- Cawston
- Coalmont
- Hedley

== First Nations ==
The Similkameen Country is mostly in the traditional territory of the Similkameen subdivision of the Okanagan people or Syilx. There are two Indian Bands in the region, the Upper Similkameen Indian Band at Princeton and the Lower Similkameen Indian Band at Keremeos. The upper reaches of the Similkameen and its upper tributaries such as the Tulameen and Pasayten Rivers, however, were part of the traditional territory of the Nlaka'pamux and their subgroup the Scw'exmx.
