= Frosty Mountain =

Mountain in British Columbia, Canada

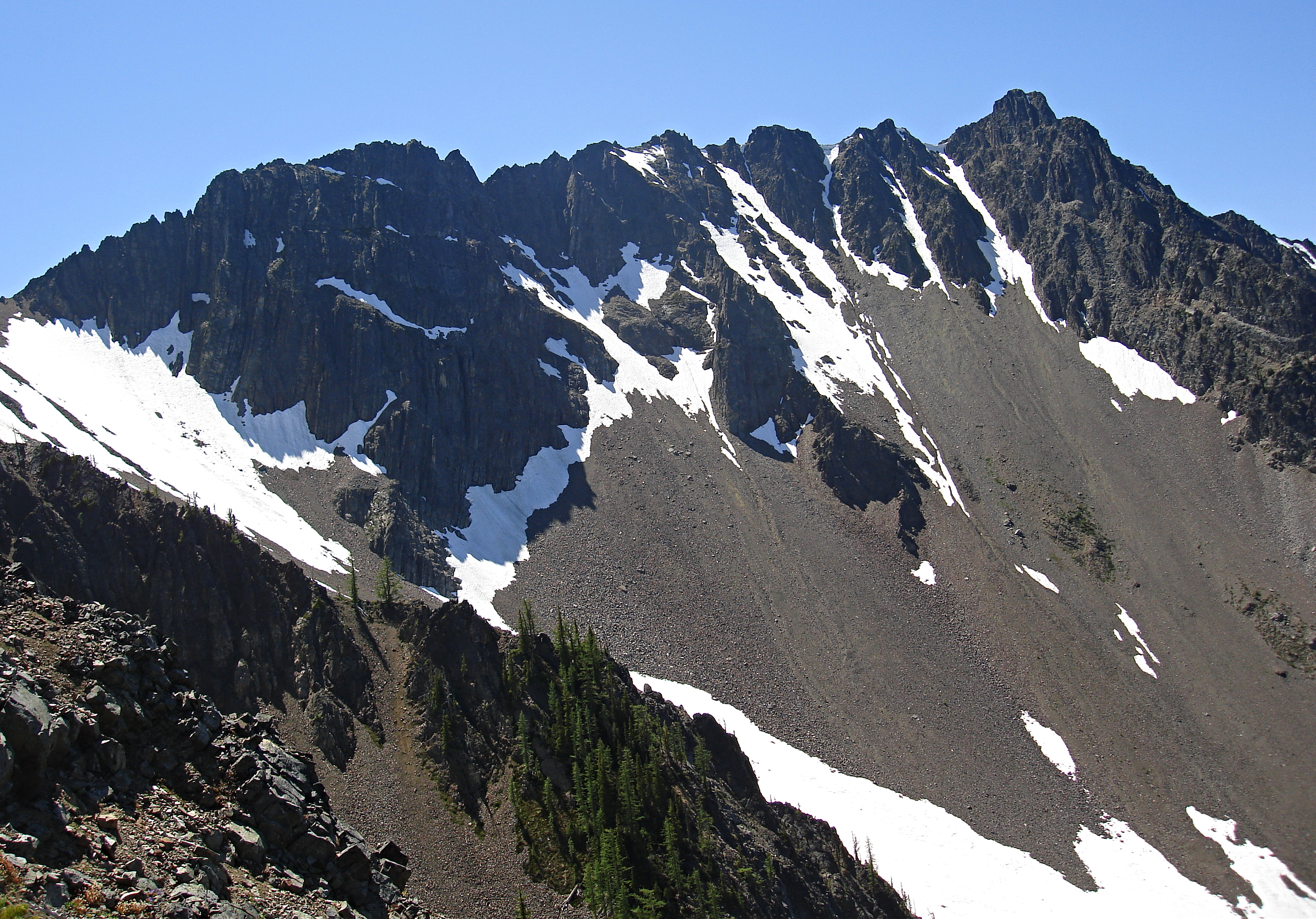
- Northeast aspect of Frosty Mountain

Highest point
- Elevation: 2,426 m (7,959 ft)
- Prominence: 451 m (1,480 ft)
- Parent peak: Castle Peak
- Listing: Mountains of British Columbia
- Coordinates: 49°00′48″N 120°50′52″W

Geography
- Location within British Columbia Location within Canada
- Interactive map of Frosty Mountain
- Location: Manning Provincial Park; British Columbia, Canada
- District: Yale Division Yale Land District
- Parent range: Hozameen Range; Canadian Cascades
- Topo map: NTS 92H2 Manning Park

Geology
- Rock type: Metasedimentary rock

Climbing
- First ascent: 1904 Sledge Tatum, George Loudon Jr.
- Easiest route: class 2 Scrambling via north ridge

Frosty Mountain is a 2,426-metre (7,959-foot) mountain summit located in the Canadian Cascades of southwestern British Columbia, Canada. It is situated 4 km (2 mi) south of Lightning Lake, 1.3 km (1 mi) north of the Canada–United States border, and 3.6 km (2 mi) north-northeast of Castle Peak, which is its nearest higher peak. Frosty Mountain is the highest peak in E. C. Manning Provincial Park, and is part of the Hozameen Range which is a subrange of the Cascade Range. It has a lower elevation subsidiary peak known as Frosty Mountain East (2409 m) which is labelled as Frosty Mountain on some maps. The Frosty Mountain name was officially adopted on March 31, 1924, by the Geographical Names Board of Canada. The peak was first climbed on September 2, 1904, by Sledge Tatum and George Loudon Jr., two members of a Boundary Survey group led by Edward C. Barnard. Precipitation runoff from the peak drains into headwaters of Frosty Creek, as well as other tributaries of the Similkameen River.

== Geology ==
The history of the formation of the Cascade Mountains dates back millions of years ago to the late Eocene Epoch. With the North American Plate overriding the Pacific Plate, episodes of volcanic igneous activity persisted. In addition, small fragments of the oceanic and continental lithosphere called terranes created the North Cascades about 50 million years ago. Frosty Mountain is composed of vertically thrusted metasedimentary rock from the ancient Methow Ocean.

During the Pleistocene period dating back over two million years ago, glaciation advancing and retreating repeatedly scoured the landscape leaving deposits of rock debris. The U-shaped cross section of the river valleys is a result of recent glaciation. Uplift and faulting in combination with glaciation have been the dominant processes which have created the tall peaks and deep valleys of the North Cascades area.

The North Cascades features some of the most rugged topography in the Cascade Range with craggy peaks, granite spires, ridges, and deep glacial valleys. Geological events occurring many years ago created the diverse topography and drastic elevation changes over the Cascade Range leading to various climate differences.

== Climate ==
Most weather fronts originate in the Pacific Ocean, and travel east toward the Cascade Mountains. As fronts approach the North Cascades, they are forced upward by the peaks of the Cascade Range, causing them to drop their moisture in the form of rain or snowfall onto the Cascades (Orographic lift). As a result, the west side of the North Cascades experiences higher precipitation than the east side, especially during the winter months in the form of snowfall. During winter months, weather is usually cloudy, but, due to high pressure systems over the Pacific Ocean that intensify during summer months, there is often little or no cloud cover during the summer.

== Gallery ==
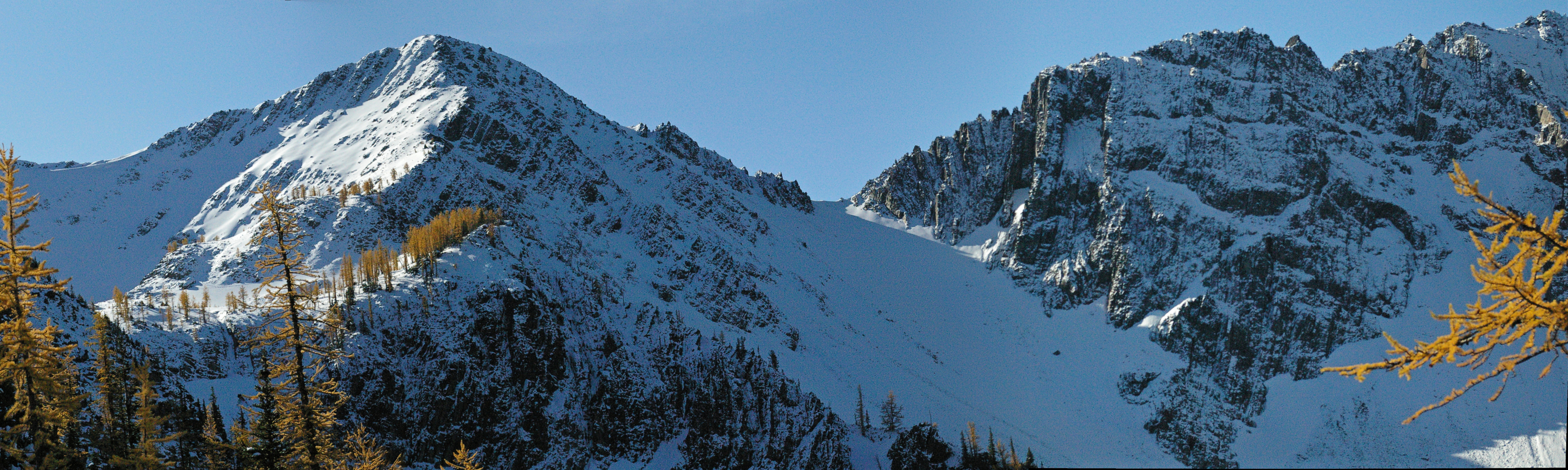
Frosty Mountain's east summit (left) and true summit (right)

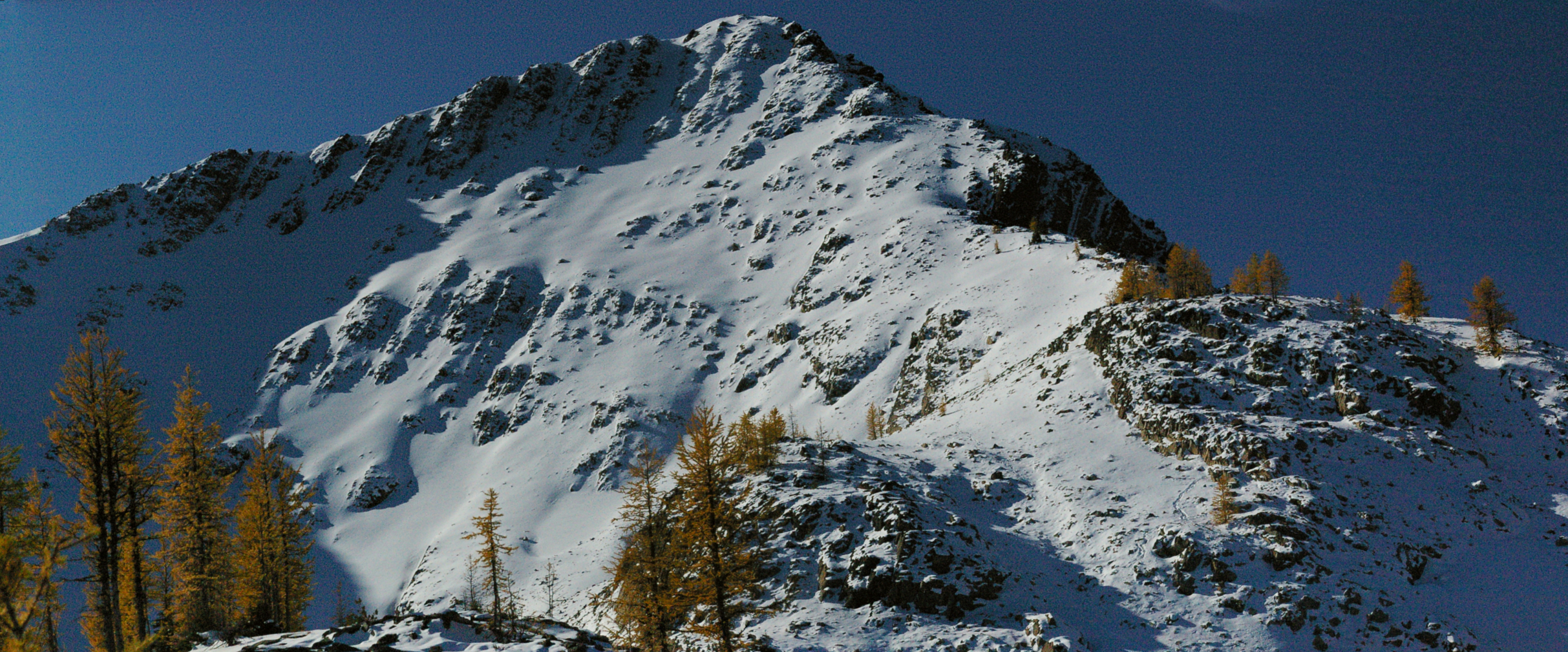
Frosty Mountain East

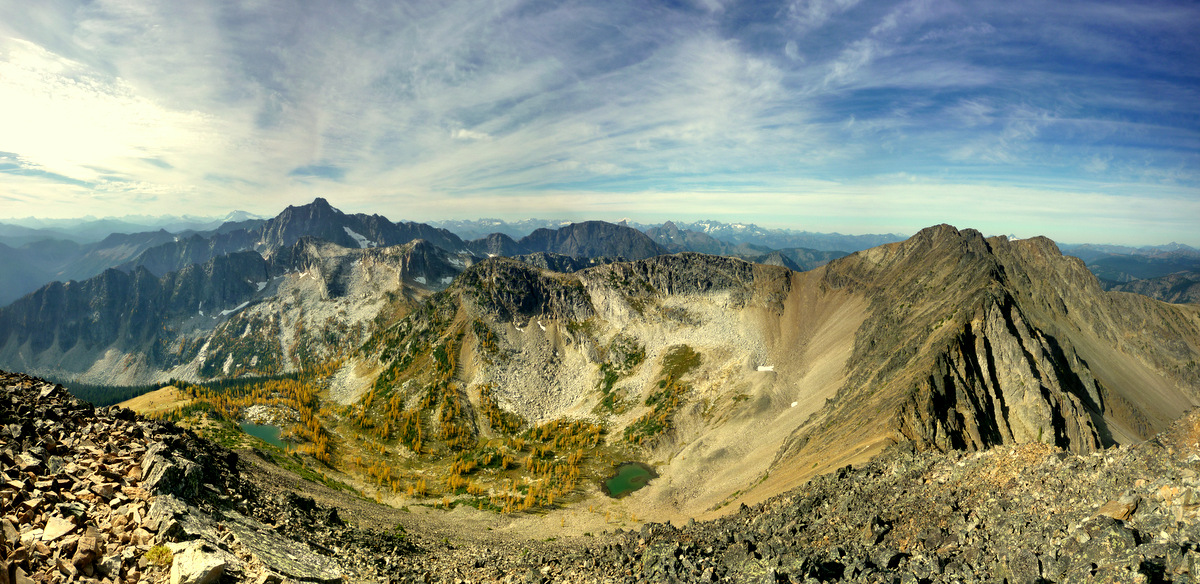
View from Frosty Mountain East with Frosty Mountain to right and Castle Peak to the left

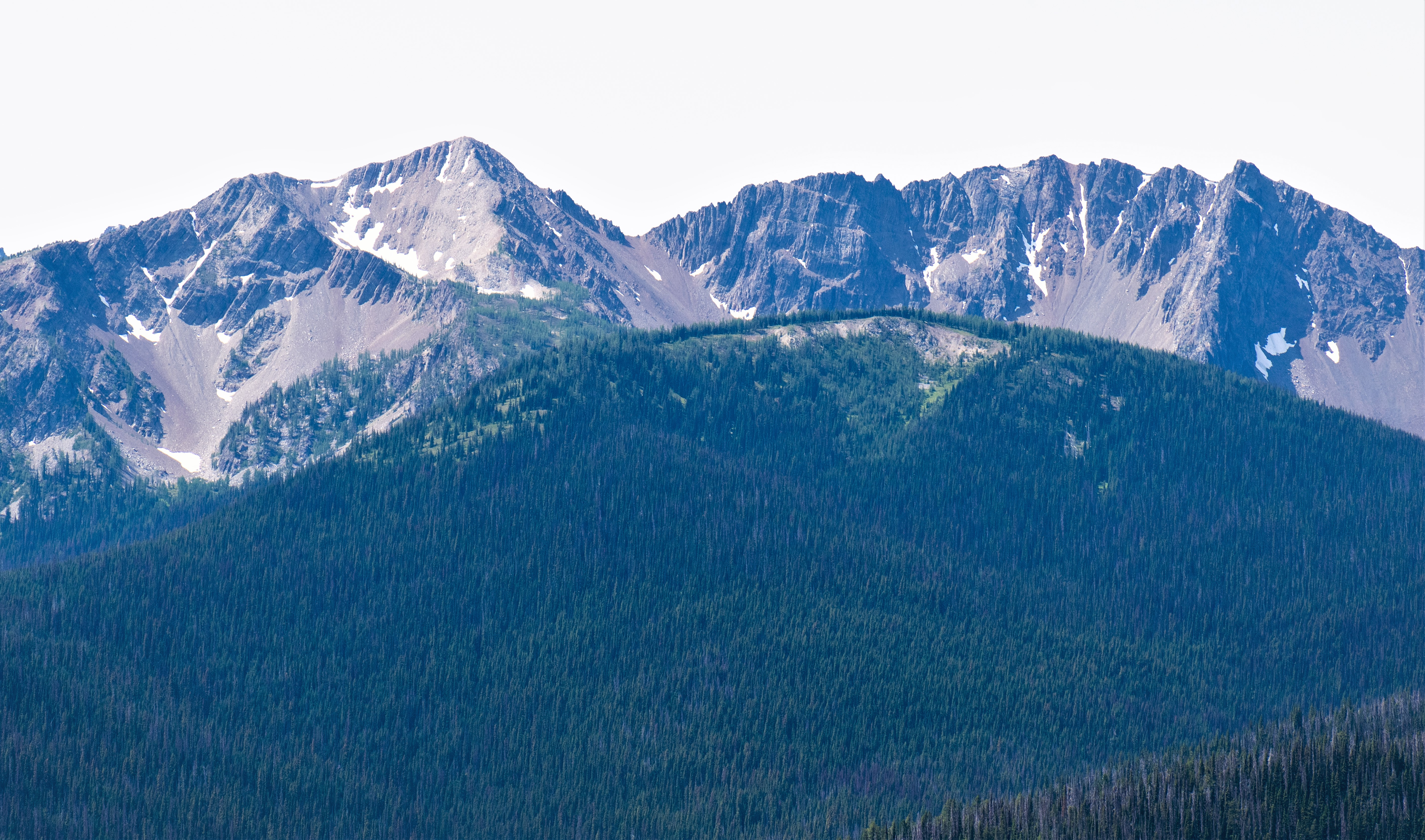
Frosty Mountain from northeast

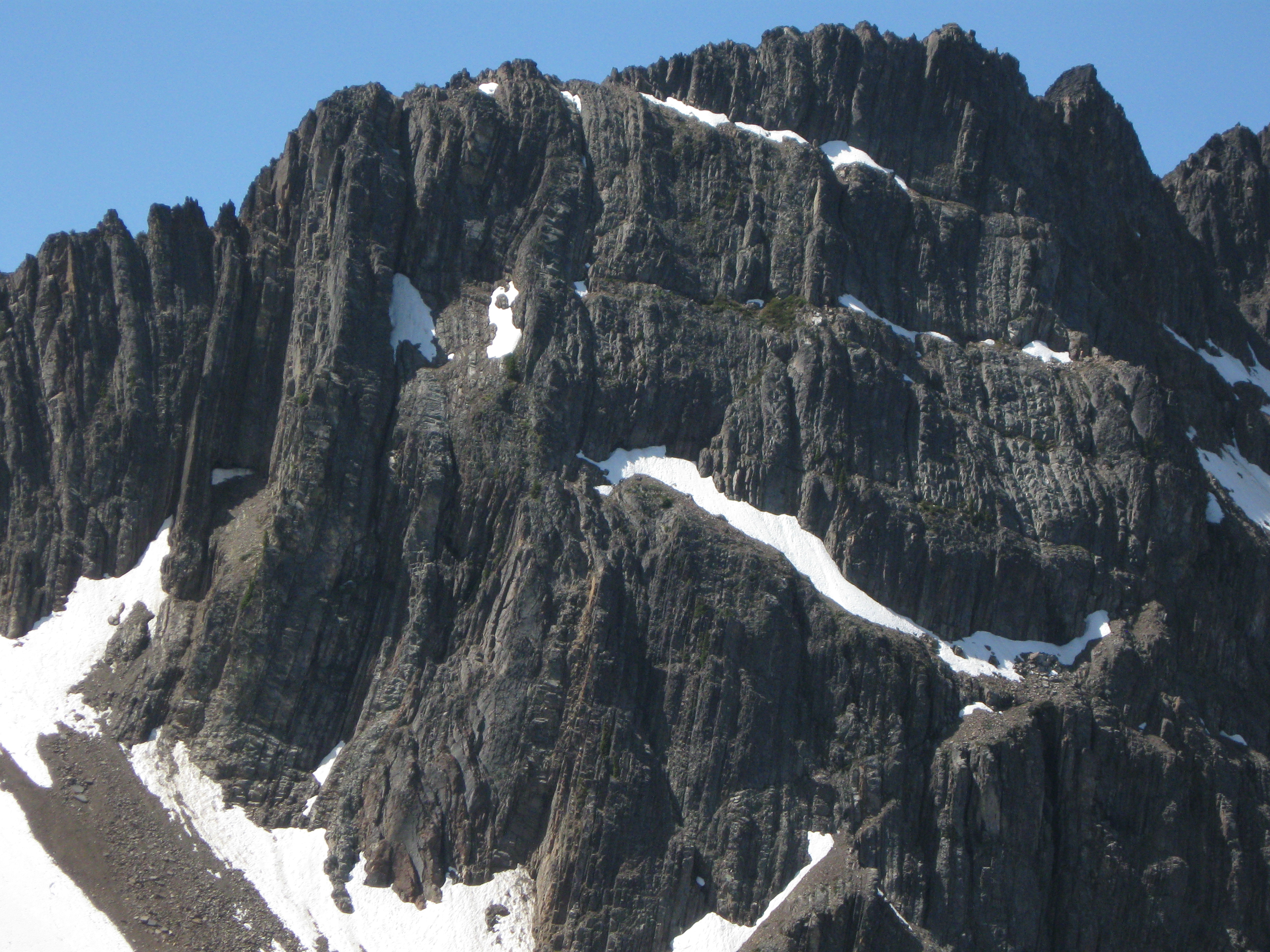
True summit

== See also ==
- Geography of the North Cascades
- Canadian Cascade Arc
