= Gibson Pass Ski Area =

Ski area in British Columbia, Canada

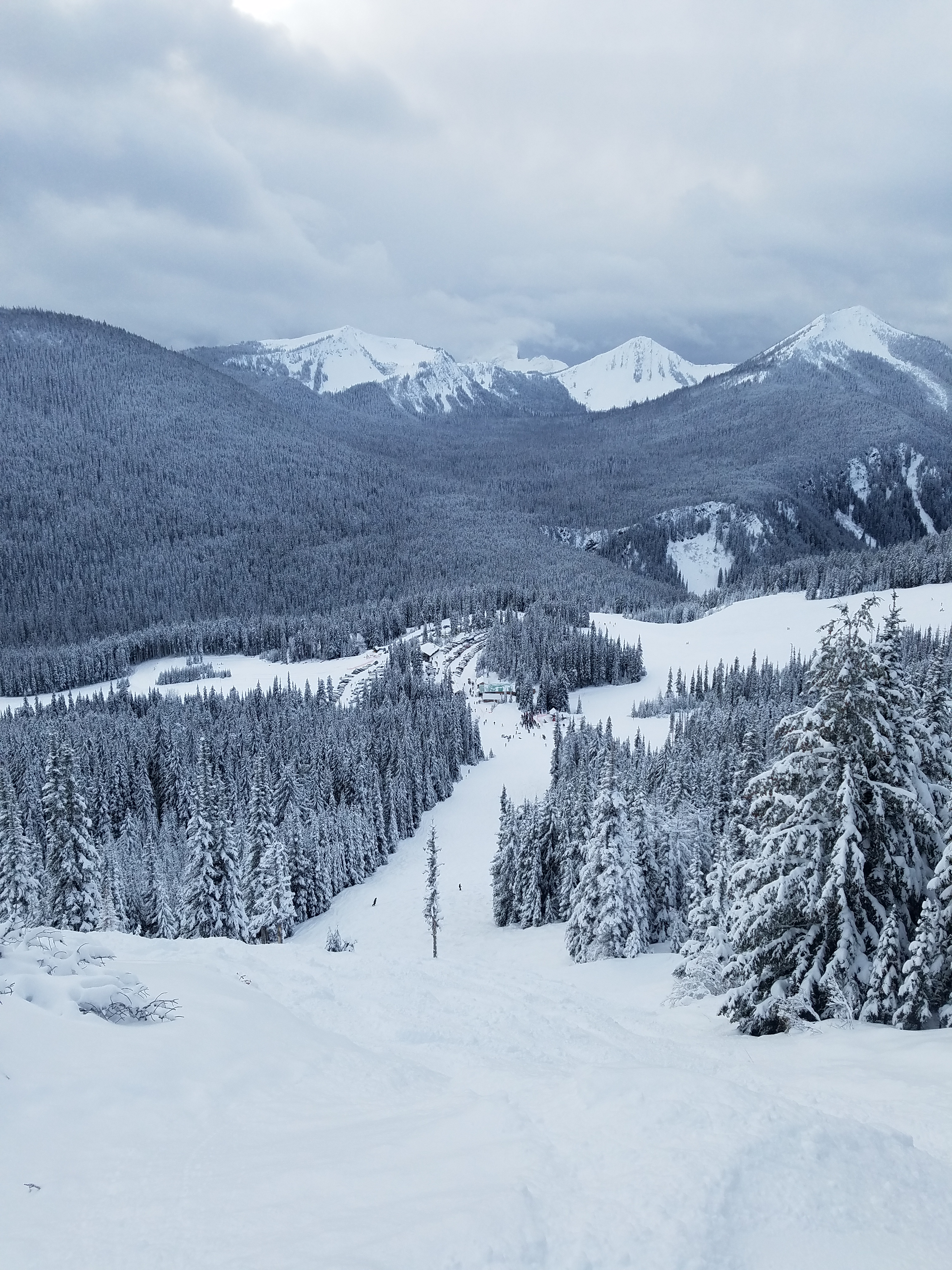
- Gibson Pass Ski Area as seen from the easternmost slopes.
- Interactive map of Gibson Pass Ski Area
- Location: Manning Park, British Columbia, Canada
- Nearest city: Vancouver; Hope; Princeton
- Coordinates: 49°4′6″N 120°54′59″W
- Vertical: 417 m (1,368 ft)
- Top elevation: 1789 m 5868 ft
- Base elevation: 1,357 m (4,452 ft)
- Skiable area: 346 acres (140 ha)
- Trails: 34 total 8 – Easiest; 11 – More Difficult; 16 – Most Difficult
- Longest run: Horseshoe; 2.1 km (1.3 mi)
- Lift system: 5 total 1 double chairlift 1 quad chairlift 1 T-bar; 1 handle tow 1 Tube Cable Tow
- Snowfall: 546 cm (215 in)
- Website: Manning Park Resort

Gibson Pass Ski Area, more commonly known as Manning Park Ski Area or simply Manning Park, is a small ski area located within E. C. Manning Provincial Park. The hill itself is not owned or operated by BC Parks, instead by the current park facility operator, Manning Park Resort. The land is used through a lease with the provincial government.

The hill has one tandem, single speed chairlift, one quad chairlift, a handle tow, a T-Bar, and a tube cable lift. Facilities at the hill itself include a day lodge and restaurant, guest services building, ski patrol cabin, and a daycare. The hill was originally owned and operated by Province of British Columbia.

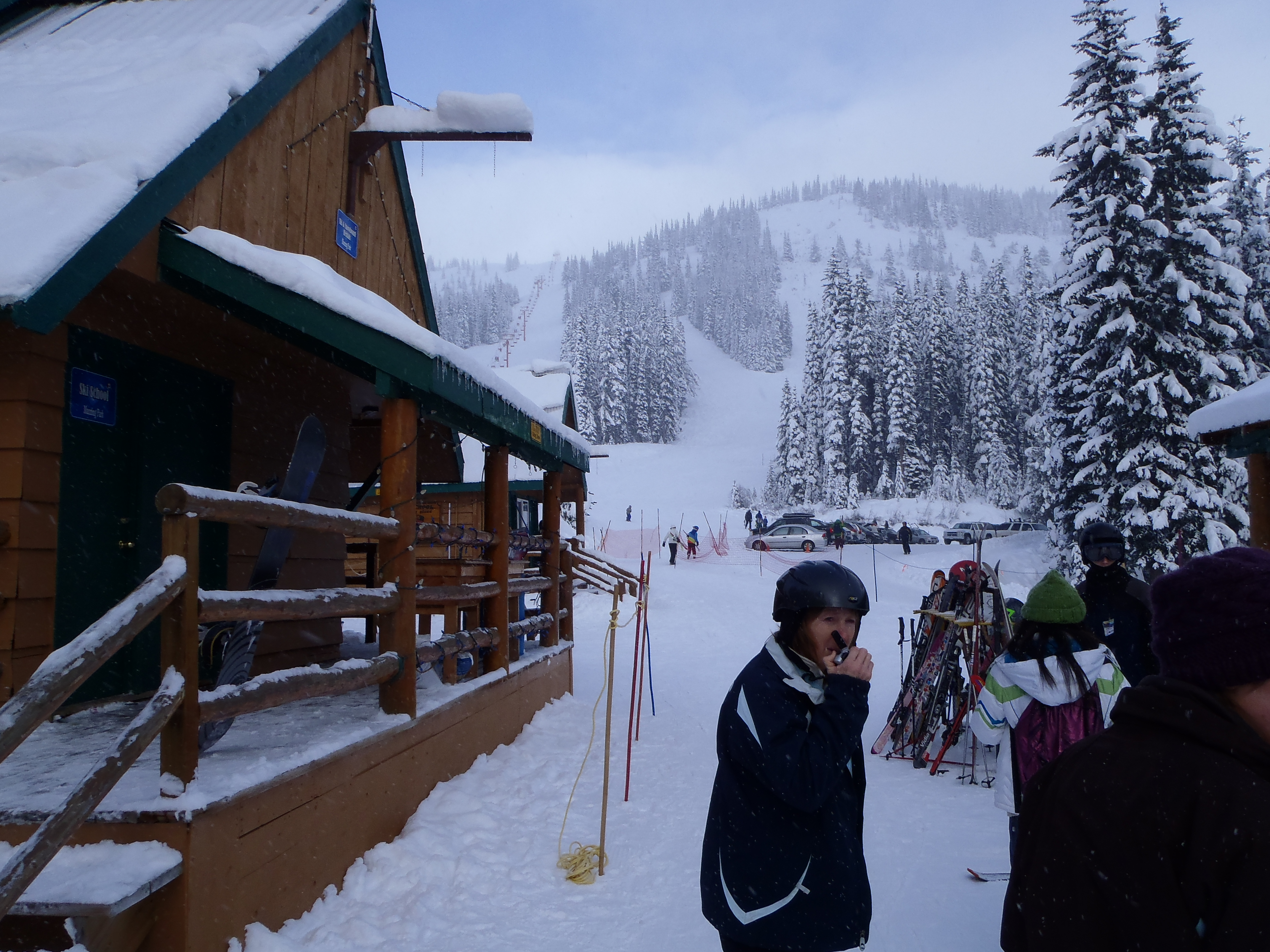
Former rental shop and base of the Orange Chair prior to being demolished

== History ==
The Hope-Princeton Highway was constructed in 1949, allowing easy access to the park. A small motel was constructed near the site of the current Manning Park Resort. Throughout the years, multiple different layouts and locations were tried for the ski hill, and many proposals (including a bid for the Winter Olympic games) were put forward, but ultimately the Gibson Pass location was a success. Prior to the construction of the current hill, a small ski area on the slopes between Blackwall Road and the resort existed. The first lift at the current location was a twin rope tow, which no longer exists. The original building for this lift still exists. The first chair constructed was the Blue Chair (officially Gibson Valley Chairlift No. 1) began operations in December 1967. This original hill had a vertical of 732 feet (223 m) and a slope of 2,385 feet (727 m). The Orange Chair (officially Gibson Valley Chairlift No. 1), which was the primary lift until 2019, was completed in November 1970.

The resort was operated by the Provincial Government (along with other Ski Resorts in the Province) until 1986, when it and other then-provincially operated hills including Cypress Bowl and Mount Seymour transferred to private operation. A fifty year land use permit was granted for private operations. After years of mismanagement, the ski hill and resort closed indefinitely on April 1, 2013. Days after the closure was announced, a new operator purchased the resort and ski hill and operations resumed the following season.

The second and primary lift, the Orange Chair, was replaced in the summer 2019 as an upgrade from a two-seat design to a four-seat Doppelmayr lift

== Facilities ==
All facilities are located at the base of the chairlifts and the top of the handle tow. There are eight buildings onsite at the ski hill, not counting lift operation buildings and disused buildings. There is no permanent lodging at the ski hill, but power hookups are available for RV's. The parking area is two-tiered and unpaved, and ploughed by Manning Park Resort. Power is supplied to the ski hill by a diesel generator located near the base of the Blue Chair. In the Summer of 2019, along with the installation of a new quad chairlift to replace the aging Orange Chair, several buildings, including the rental and snow school buildings, were demolished to make way for a new guest services building at the base of the hill.

Building	Use
Day Lodge	Restaurant; Lunch Room; Lockers; Flush Toilets
Guest Services Building	Rentals; Ski School; Ticketing
Ski Patrol Cabin	Base of operations of the Canadian Ski Patrol System
Twin Tow	Old rope tow control building, sometimes used for races, events and ski club meetings.
Bistro	Daycare
Generator/Maintenance Building	Diesel Generator; Equipment Storage

== Lifts ==
Manning Park resort currently has five lifts: one tandem single-speed chairlift of 1967 vintage (the Blue Chair), one Doppelmayr fixed-grip Quad chair (new for the 2019-2020 season), one handle-tow as the upper lift in the novice area, a T-bar as the lower lift in the novice area, and a cable tow for the Polar Coaster. The novice area is split into two vertical sections. Restraining safety devices are installed on both chairlifts.

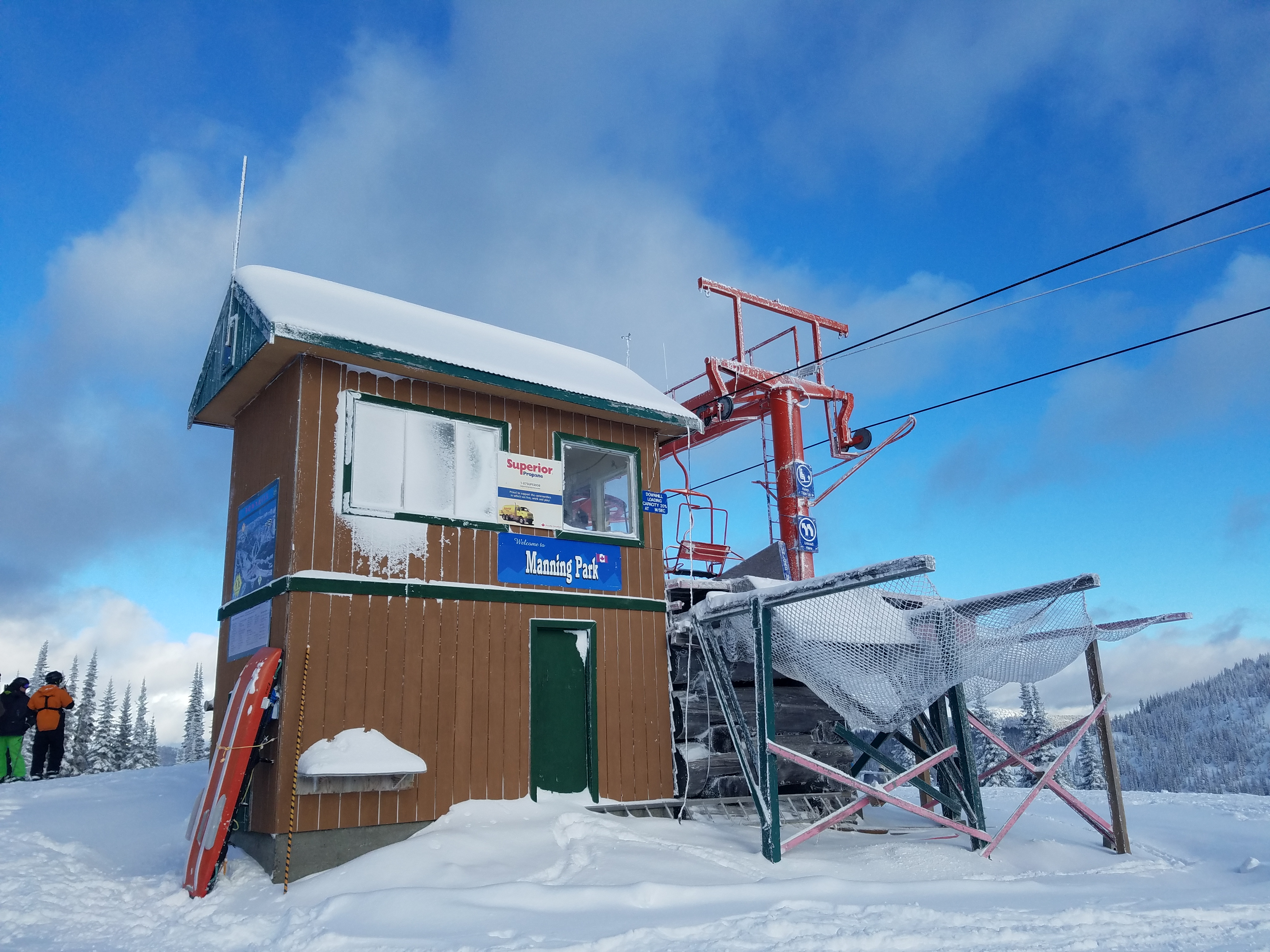
The unloading station of the former Orange Chair (replaced by a quad chairlift in 2019)

== Trails ==
Alpine Trails

Green	Blue	Black
Wagon Trail	Race Course	Back Bowl
Old Wagon Trail	Blue Face	Muncher's Delight
Horseshoe	Chit-Chat	Blue Streak
Loop	Orange Streak	Hokey's Hollow
Cross Over	Tower Six	Tree Well
Junction	Mogul Hill	Gravity Bowl
Handle Tow	Featherstone	Big Spruce
T-Bar	Featherstone Special	Gully
	Shadow	Timber Cruise
	Coming Home	Snag
	Fool Hen	Lower Snag
		Sun Step Traverse
		Sun Step
		Apple Bowl
		Outer Apple Bowl
		Apple Bowl Hike

Nordic Trails

Green	Blue	Black
Beaver Pond Trail	Lone Duck Trail	Graduation Hill
Little Muddy Trail	South Gibson Trail	North Gibson Trail
Campground Loop		Cascade Lookout Trail
Mini-Loop		Blackwall Peak Trail
Strawberry Flats Loop

== Transportation ==
The ski hill is located approximately ten minutes from the Manning Park Lodge off of Highway 3. A free shuttle is available every day of the week between the lodge and the ski hill. On June 1, 2018, Greyhound terminated their bus services along the Hope Princeton Highway. Partial bus service was restored to the resort, and thus the skihill, on July 13, 2019, by an unrelated operator.

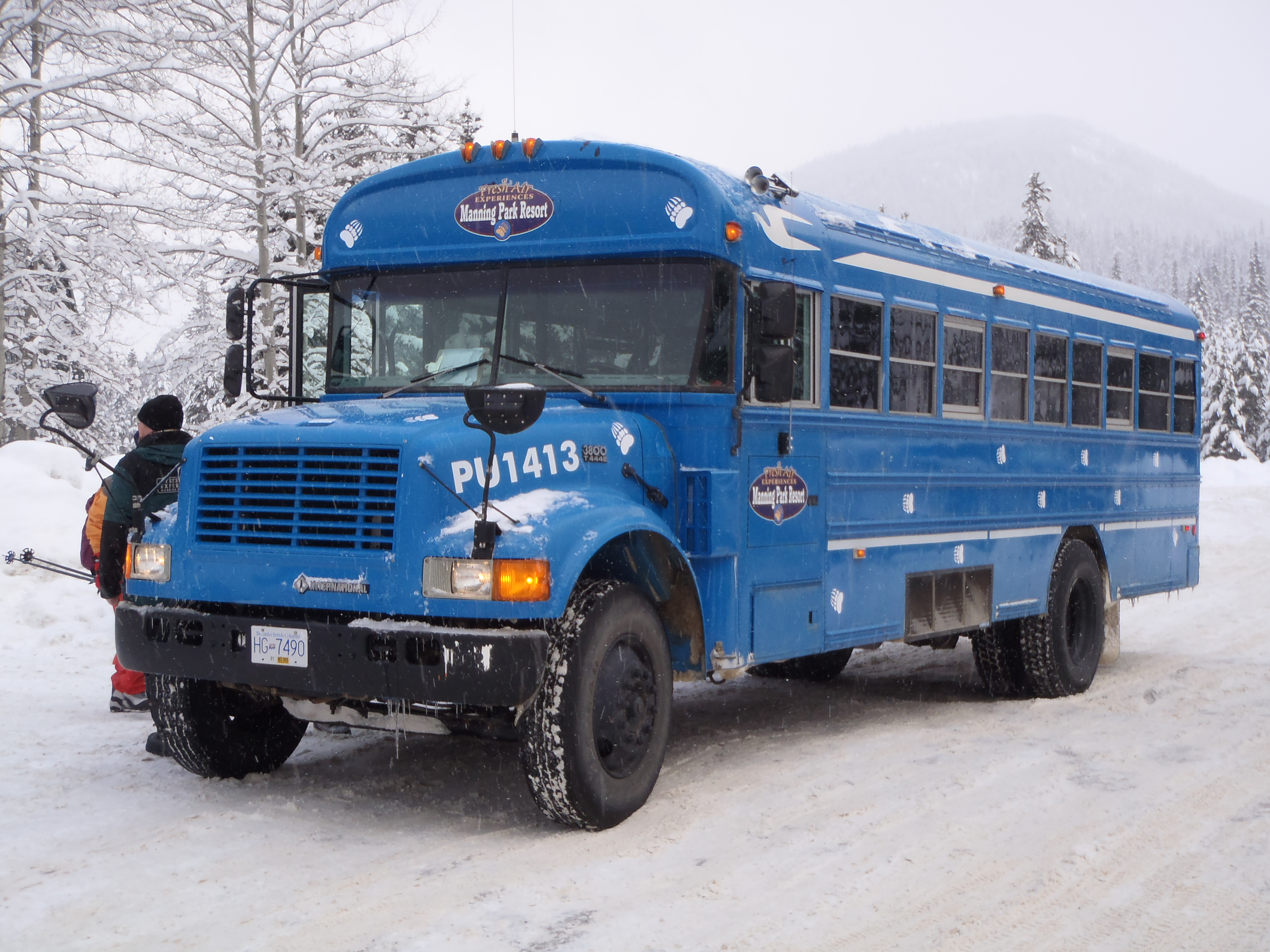
Free shuttle between Manning Park Lodge and the day lodge of the ski hill.

== See also ==
- East Gate, British Columbia
- Manning Provincial Park
