= Castle Peak (Washington) =

Mountain in Washington (state), United States

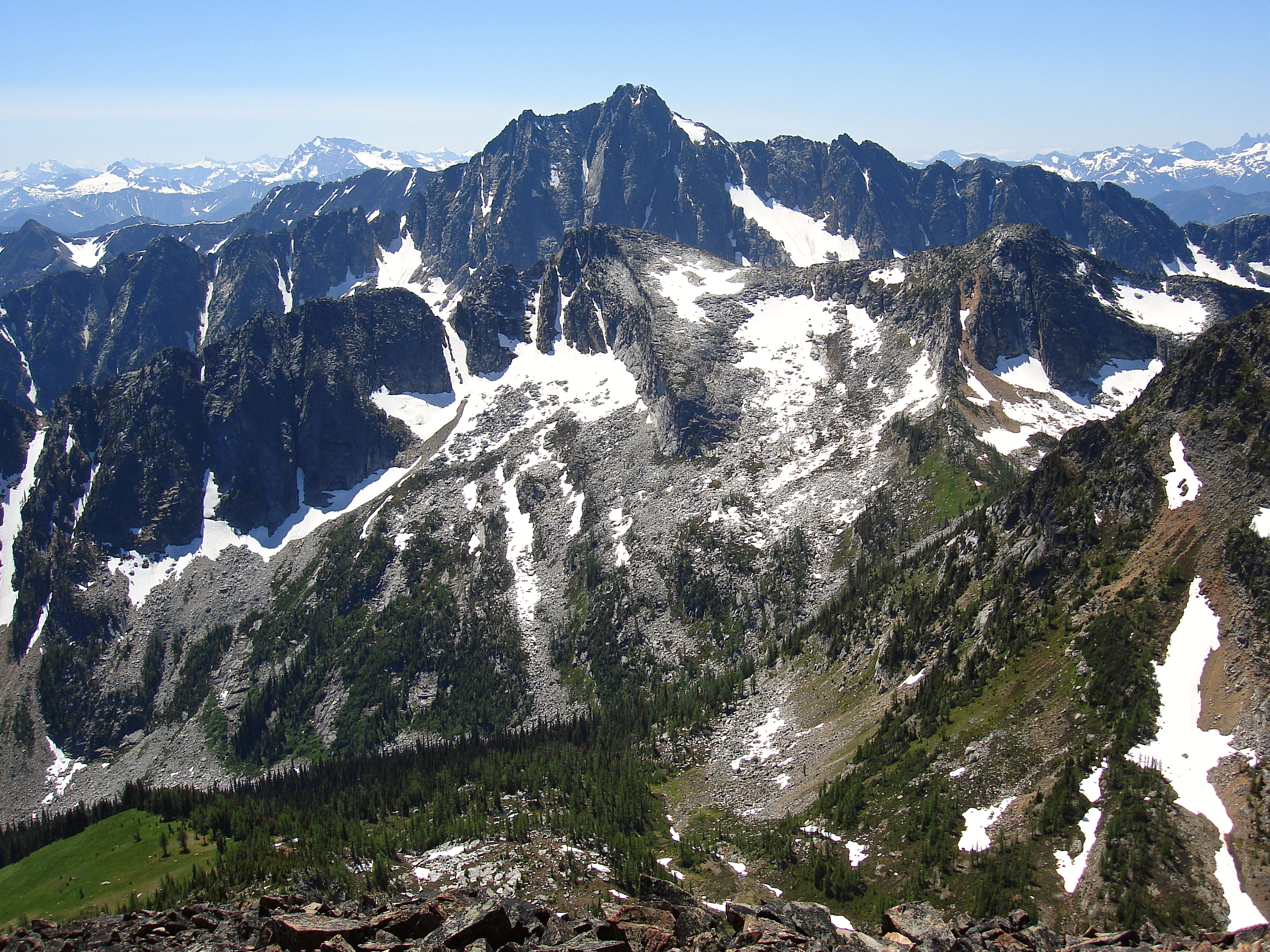
- Castle Peak seen from Frosty Mountain

Highest point
- Elevation: 8,343 ft (2,543 m)
- Prominence: 3,263 ft (995 m)
- Parent peak: Osceola Peak
- Isolation: 15.09 mi (24.29 km)
- Listing: Washington highest major summits
- Coordinates: 48°58′56″N 120°51′44″W

Geography
- Location within Washington (state) Location within the United States
- Interactive map of Castle Peak
- Country: United States
- State: Washington
- County: Okanogan / Whatcom
- Protected area: Pasayten Wilderness
- Parent range: Hozameen Range; North Cascades; Cascade Range
- Topo map: USGS Castle Peak

Geology
- Rock type: Granite

Climbing
- First ascent: 1904 USGS Survey party
- Easiest route: Scrambling

Castle Peak is a prominent 8,343-foot (2,543-metre) mountain summit located in the Hozameen Range of the North Cascades, on the shared border between Okanogan County and Whatcom County of Washington state. The mountain is situated one mile (1.6 km) south of the Canada–United States border, on the Cascade crest, in the Pasayten Wilderness, on land managed by the Okanogan–Wenatchee National Forest. The nearest higher peak is Jack Mountain, 14.8 miles (23.8 km) to the south-southwest. Castle Peak is the second highest summit of the Hozameen Range following Jack Mountain. Castle Peak is the sixth-highest mountain in the Pasayten Wilderness. Precipitation runoff from the mountain drains east into Castle Creek, a tributary of the Similkameen River, or west into tributaries of the Skagit River. Topographic relief is significant as the summit rises nearly 3,000 feet (914 meters) above Crow Creek in 0.75 mile (1.2 km).

== Geology ==
The North Cascades features some of the most rugged topography in the Cascade Range with craggy peaks, granite spires, ridges, and deep glacial valleys. Geological events occurring many years ago created the diverse topography and drastic elevation changes over the Cascade Range leading to various climate differences. The history of the formation of the Cascade Mountains dates back millions of years ago to the late Eocene Epoch. With the North American Plate overriding the Pacific Plate, episodes of volcanic igneous activity persisted. In addition, small fragments of the oceanic and continental lithosphere called terranes created the North Cascades about 50 million years ago.

During the Pleistocene period dating back over two million years ago, glaciation advancing and retreating repeatedly scoured the landscape leaving deposits of rock debris. The U-shaped cross section of the river valleys is a result of recent glaciation. Uplift and faulting in combination with glaciation have been the dominant processes which have created the tall peaks and deep valleys of the North Cascades area.

== Climate ==
Weather fronts originating in the Pacific Ocean travel northeast toward the Cascade Mountains. As fronts approach the North Cascades, they are forced upward by the peaks of the Cascade Range (orographic lift), causing them to drop their moisture in the form of rain or snowfall onto the Cascades. As a result, the west side of the North Cascades experiences higher precipitation than the east side, especially during the winter months in the form of snowfall. During winter months, weather is usually cloudy, but due to high pressure systems over the Pacific Ocean that intensify during summer months, there is often little or no cloud cover during the summer.

== Climbing Routes ==
Established climbing routes on Castle Peak:

- South Route - class 3
- East-southeast Ridge - class 3
- North Face, West Side - class 5
- North Buttress, East - class 5.9
- North Face, East Buttress - class 5.10
- North Face, Right Central Buttress - class 5.8

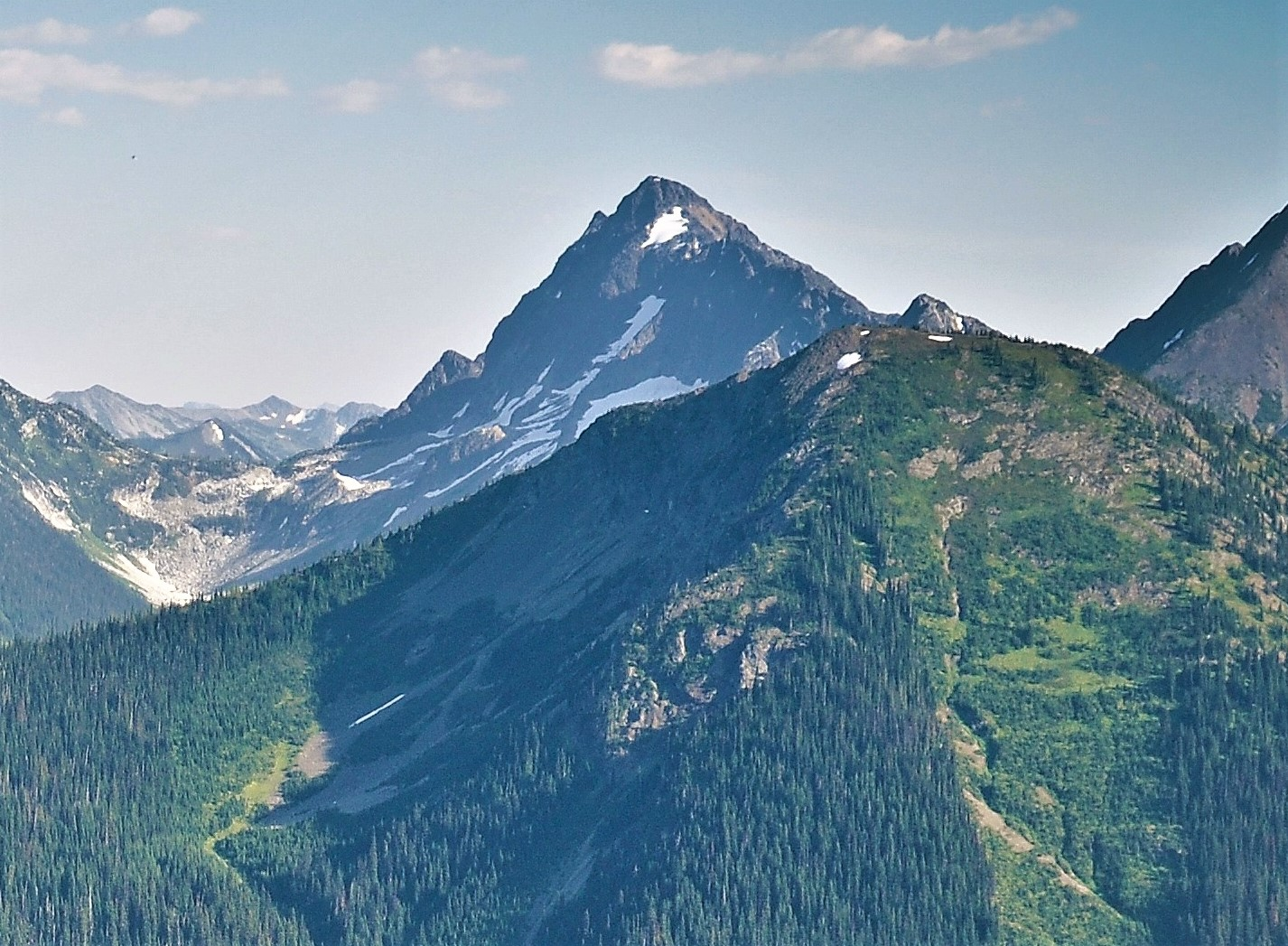
Northwest aspect

== See also ==
- List of mountain peaks of Washington (state)
- Geography of the North Cascades
- Geology of the Pacific Northwest
- Mount Winthrop
