= Eastgate, British Columbia =

Coordinates: 49°08′16″N 120°36′49″W

Eastgate Manning Park
- Unincorporated Town
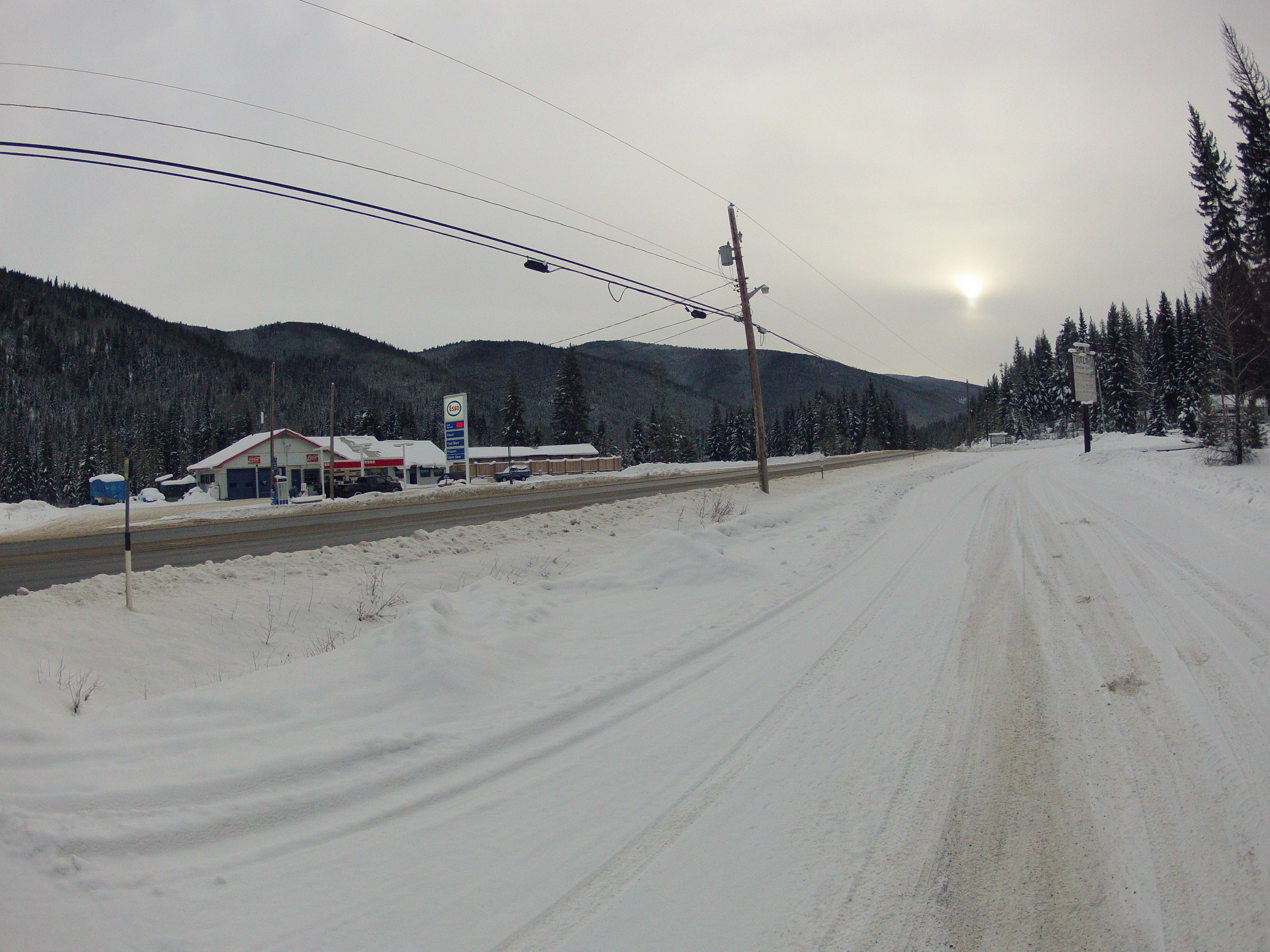
- Eastgate's primary business, the Canco gas station.

- Location of East Gate in British Columbia
- Country: Canada
- Province: British Columbia
- Regional district: Okanagan-Similkameen

Area
  - Total: 5.4 km^{2} (2.1 sq mi)
- Elevation: 927 m (3,041 ft)
- Time zone: UTC-8 (PST)
- Highways: Crowsnest Highway
- Waterways: Similkameen River

Eastgate is a small cabin community located at the Eastern portal of Manning Provincial Park in the Cascade Mountains of British Columbia, Canada. It is located in the Similkameen-Okanagan Forest District. The community store and gas station, and formerly the now closed restaurant, are popular for visitors of Manning Park Resort and ski area. The settlement is located along the uppermost Similkameen River. Access to Eastgate is limited solely to east–west travel along the Hope-Princeton Highway. The community has one gas station, a Canco gas station, a cabin rental and a bed and breakfast. The gas station was formerly host to the Eastgate Canada Post Office. The Eastgate Volunteer Fire Department, with three trucks, provides fire protection for the area and frequently participates in forest fire control in the region. The small town shows up on some government maps (such as topographical maps) as Manning Park.

The ARC (Alpine Rescue Centre) is located in Eastgate and is the residence of the Canadian Ski Patrol during the winter, and is rented to groups during the summer. The ski patrol provides safety services to the Gibson Pass Ski Area.

On August 8, 2022, government workers began repaving

== History ==
Since at least 1905, Charlie Bonnevier owned and lived on the land now occupied by East Gate. In 1944, a parcel of 160 acres (65 ha) was sold to the Tower Family, which became the Tower Ranch. As this property was one of the few private plots along the soon-to-open highway, and the highway's aesthetic qualities were of serious concern to the BC Parks, the family agreed not to clear-cut or otherwise make the property unpleasant for motorists. Little of the original ranch remains, however one original house stands, and the roads are named in memory of the ranch. The ranch formerly maintained an airstrip which is now decommissioned and is now home to several houses. Near the gas station, the historic Pasayten Cabin stands. It is currently uninhabited.

== Businesses ==
The primary business is the Canco gas station that includes a food store and previously included a diner called "Dave's Diner" and a mechanic service. Up until 2022 it was an Esso. Other businesses include a rental cabin and two camp-grounds.

== Eastgate Volunteer Fire Department ==
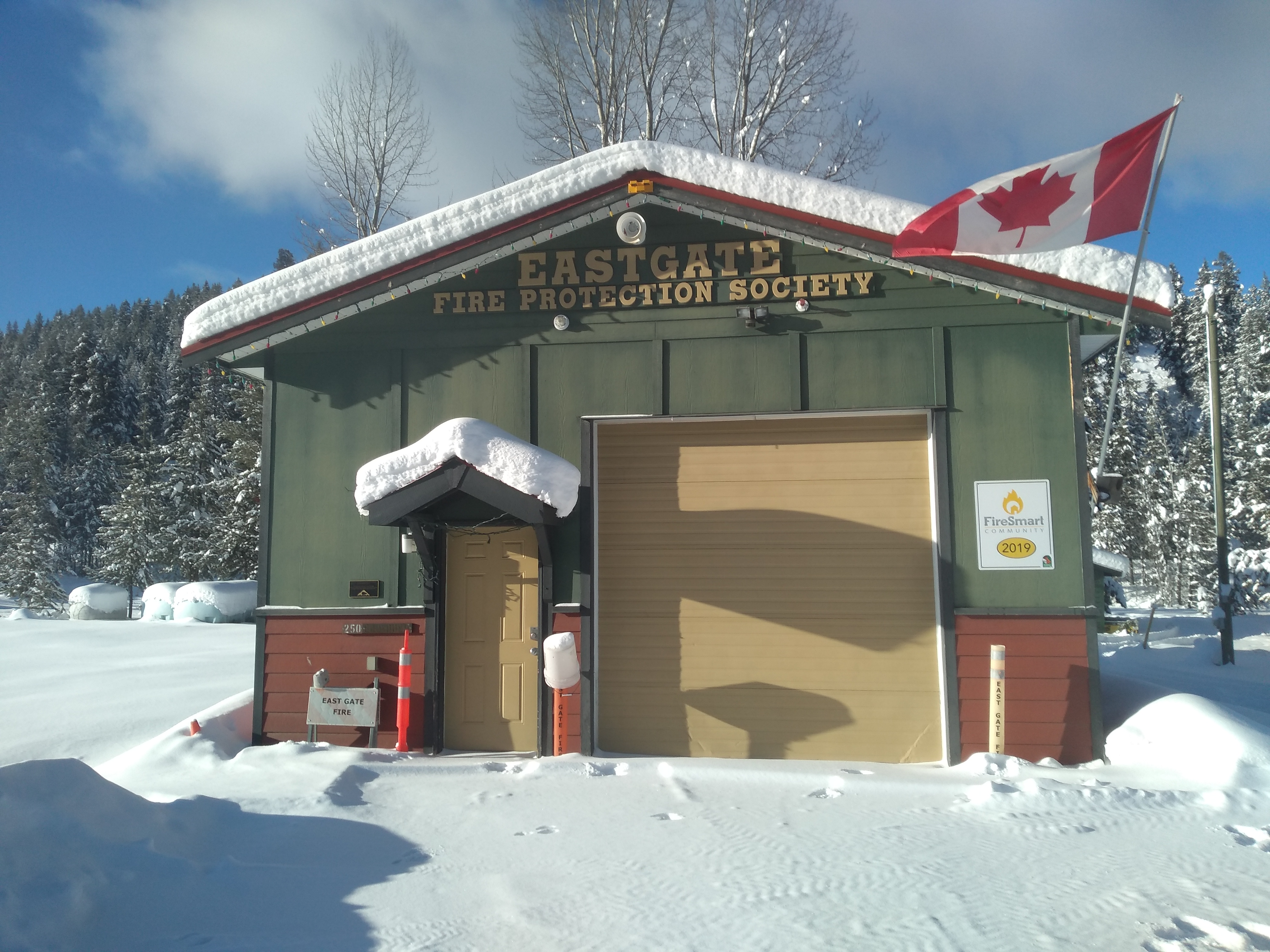
The Firehall

The community is served by the Eastgate Fire Protection Society, which maintains three fire trucks. One of these trucks was stolen in May 2010 and was quickly recovered, albeit without vital components stolen by thieves, by a paramedic using a helicopter for the search. The fire department formerly used a mid-1930s fire truck, and until 2014 was in possession of a 1970s era firetruck until it was purchased for use at Manning Park Resort.

== Natural Disasters ==
=== 2021 Garrison Lake Wildfire ===
During the summer of 2021 the Garrison Lake Wildfire threatened Eastgate. The fire was first discovered on July 23, 2021, and by September 8 had grown to an estimated 14,564 hectares. At its closest, the fire was 1-2 kilometers (estimated) away from Eastgate. Eastgate had already been on evacuation alert but was put on evacuation order on July 31 when the fire was 8,175 hectares in size.

=== 2021 Flood ===
The November 2021 Pacific Northwest floods caused flooding throughout lower Eastgate leading to an evacuation order, a collapsed house, and countless property damage mainly due to flooded basements.

== Photos ==
Photos

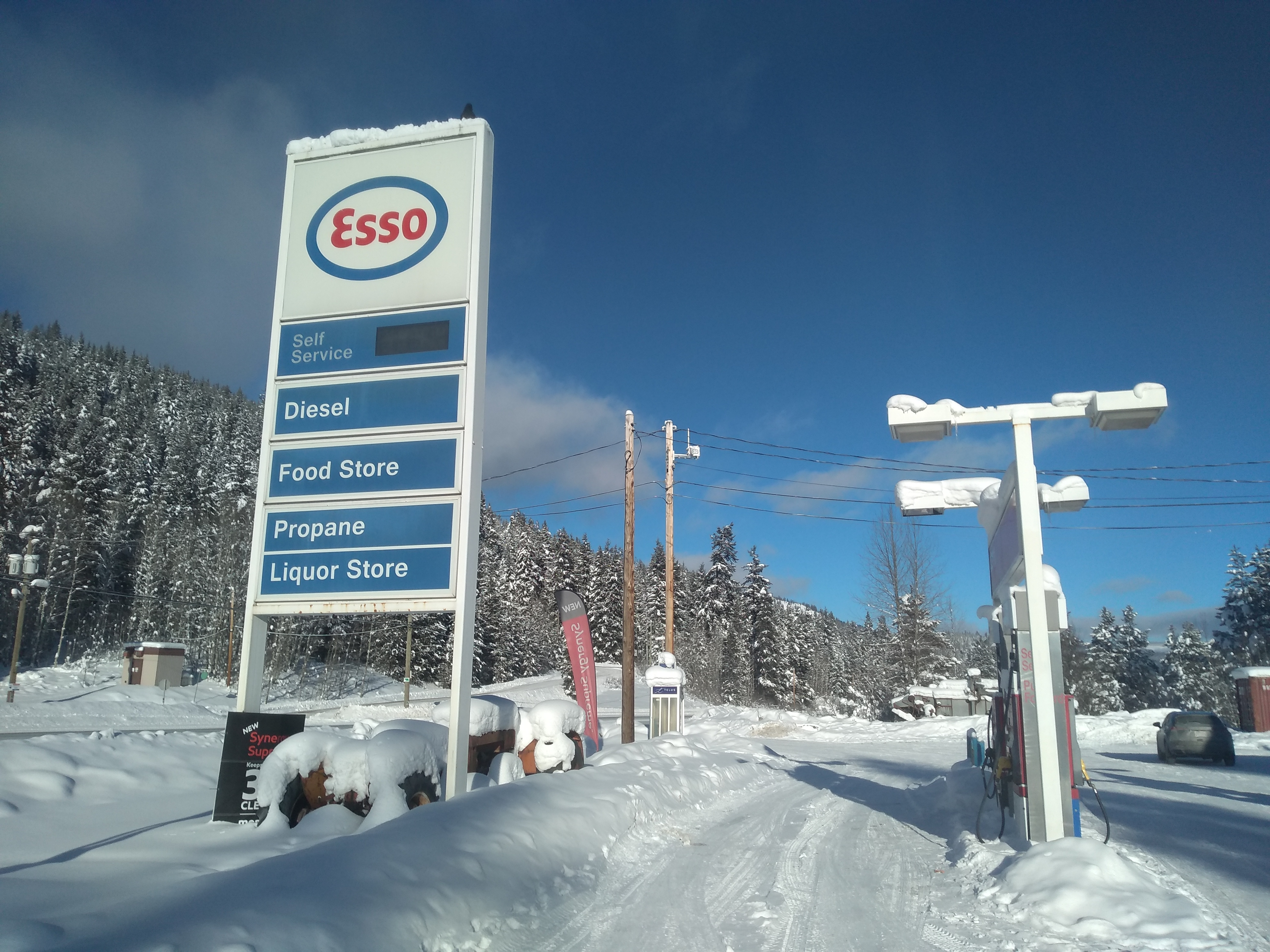

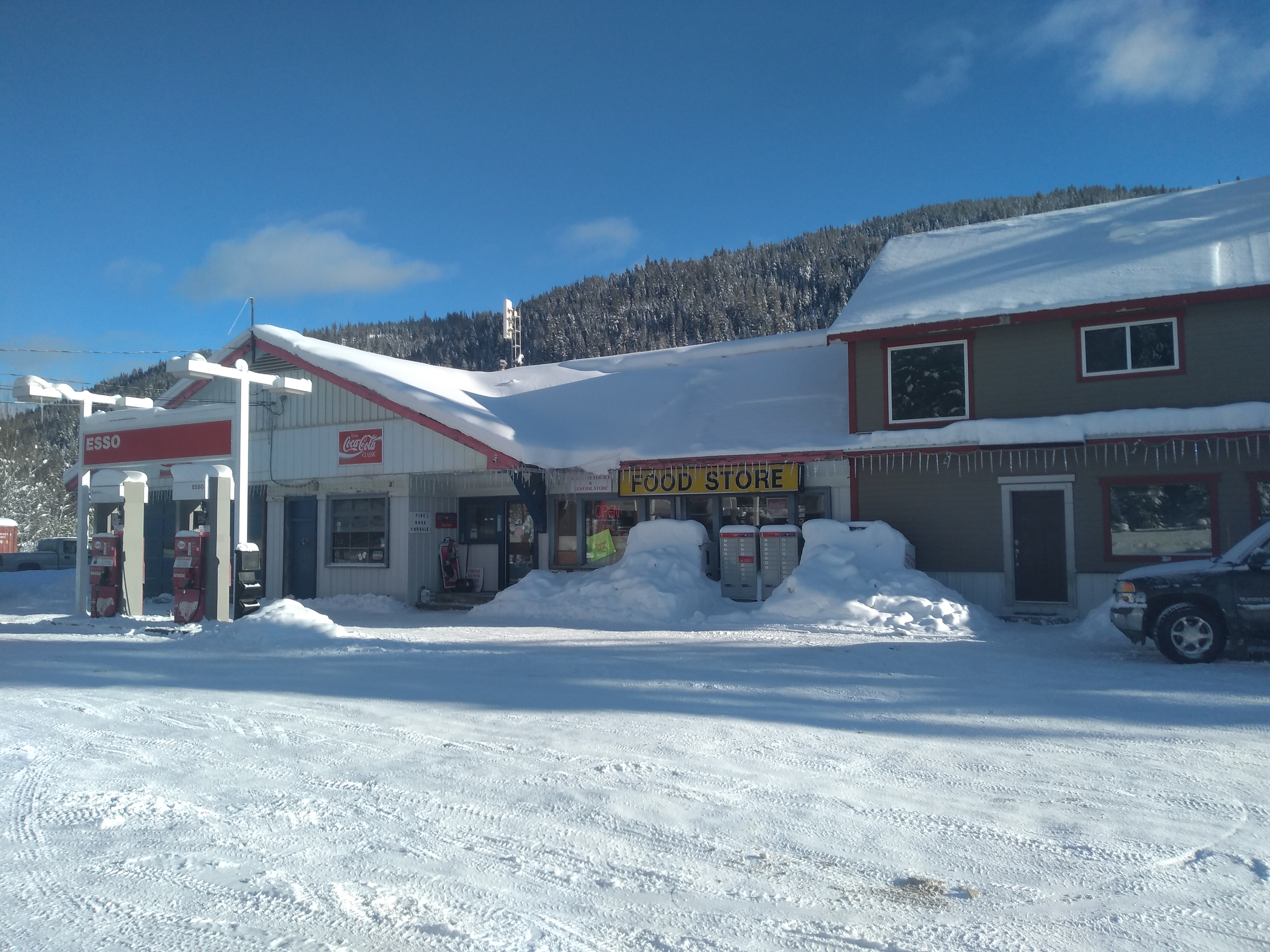

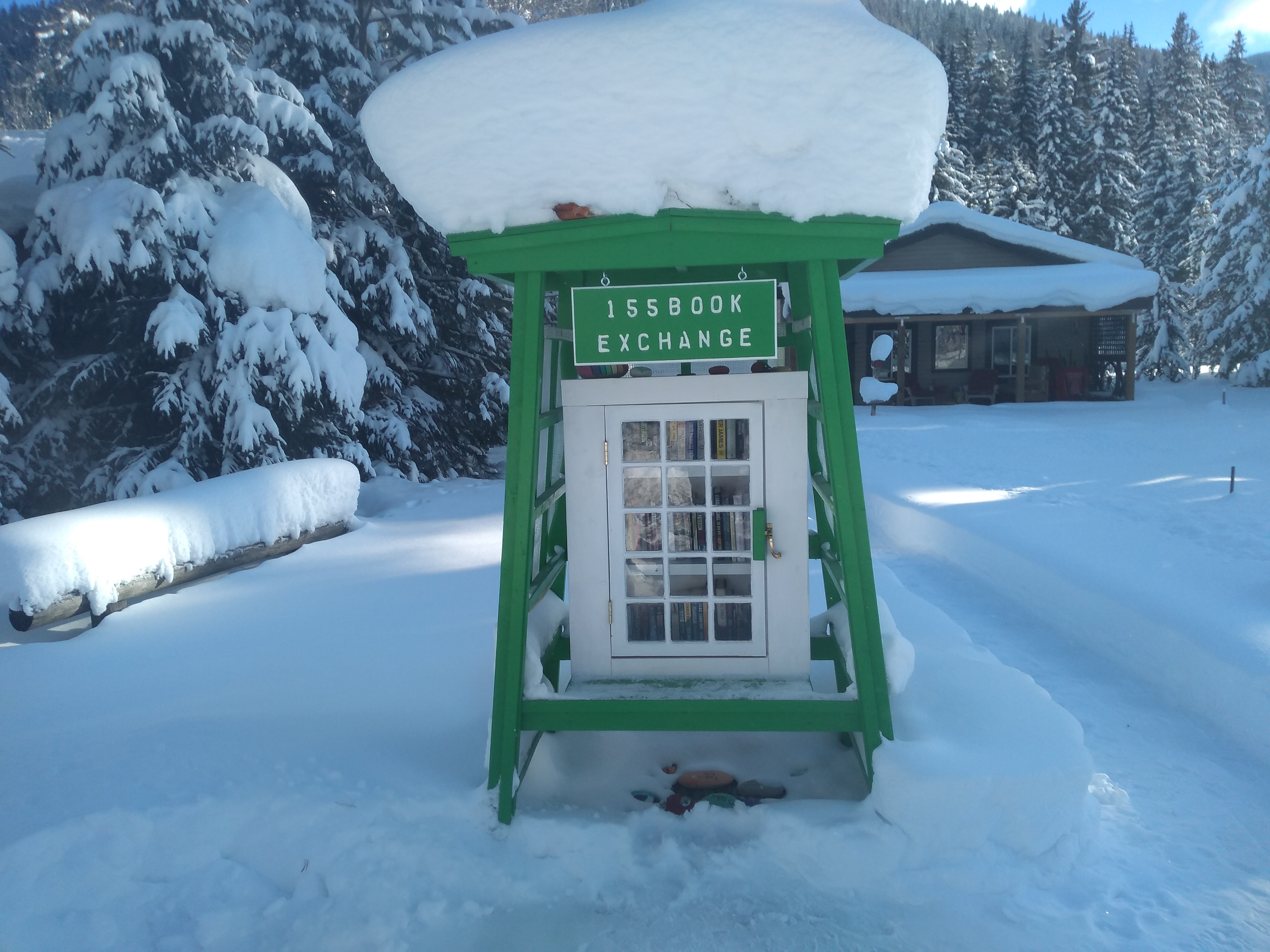

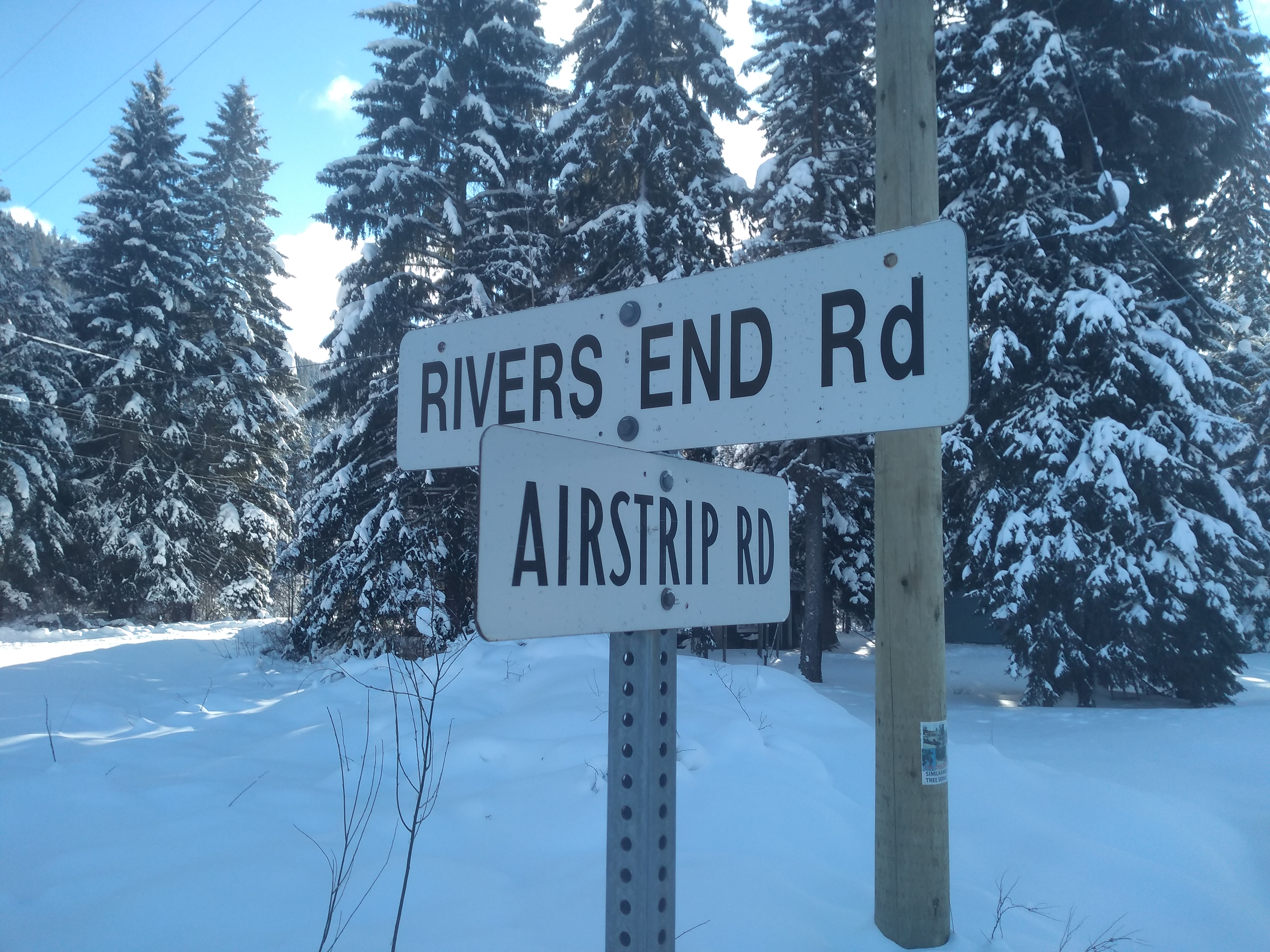

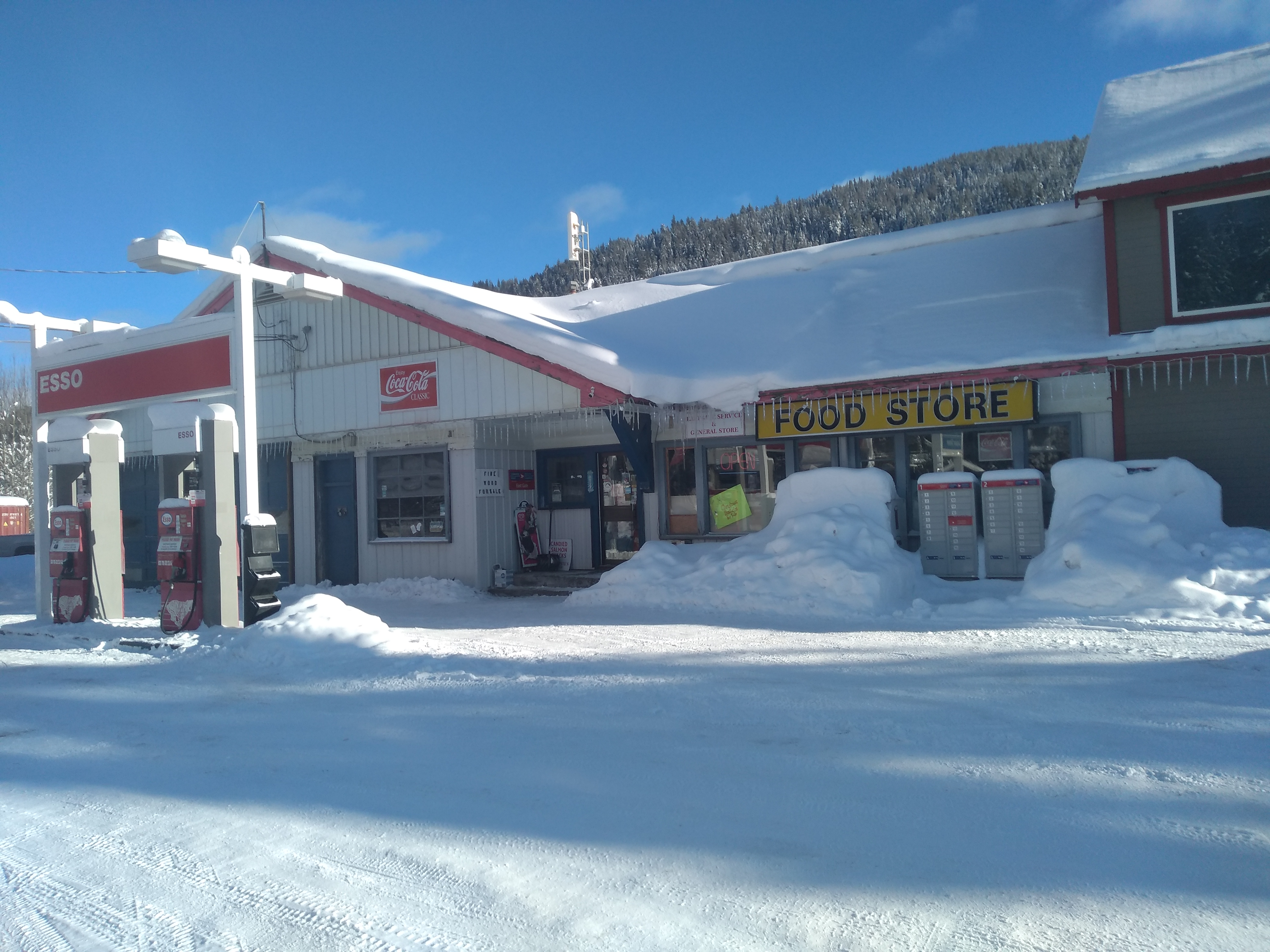

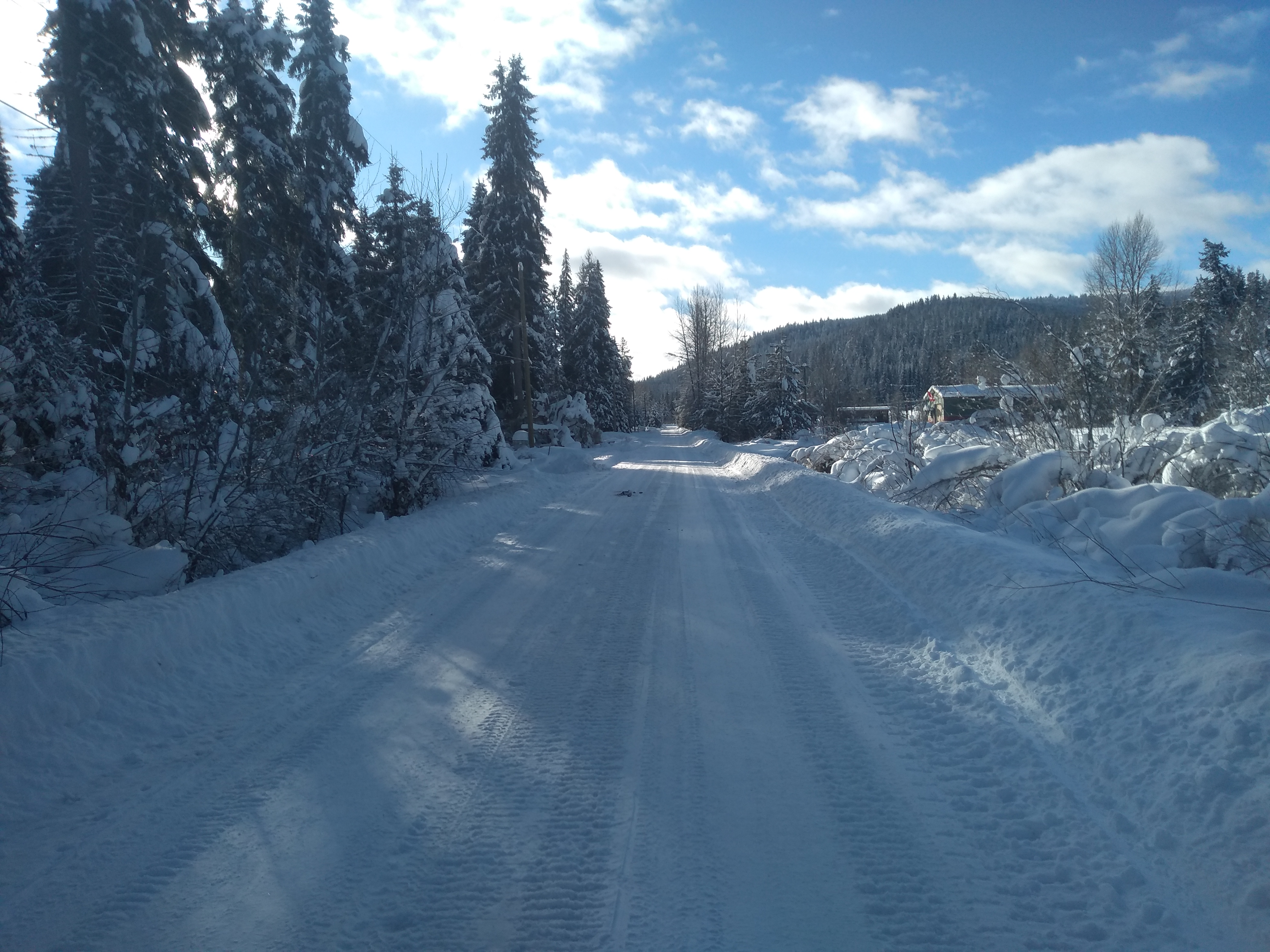

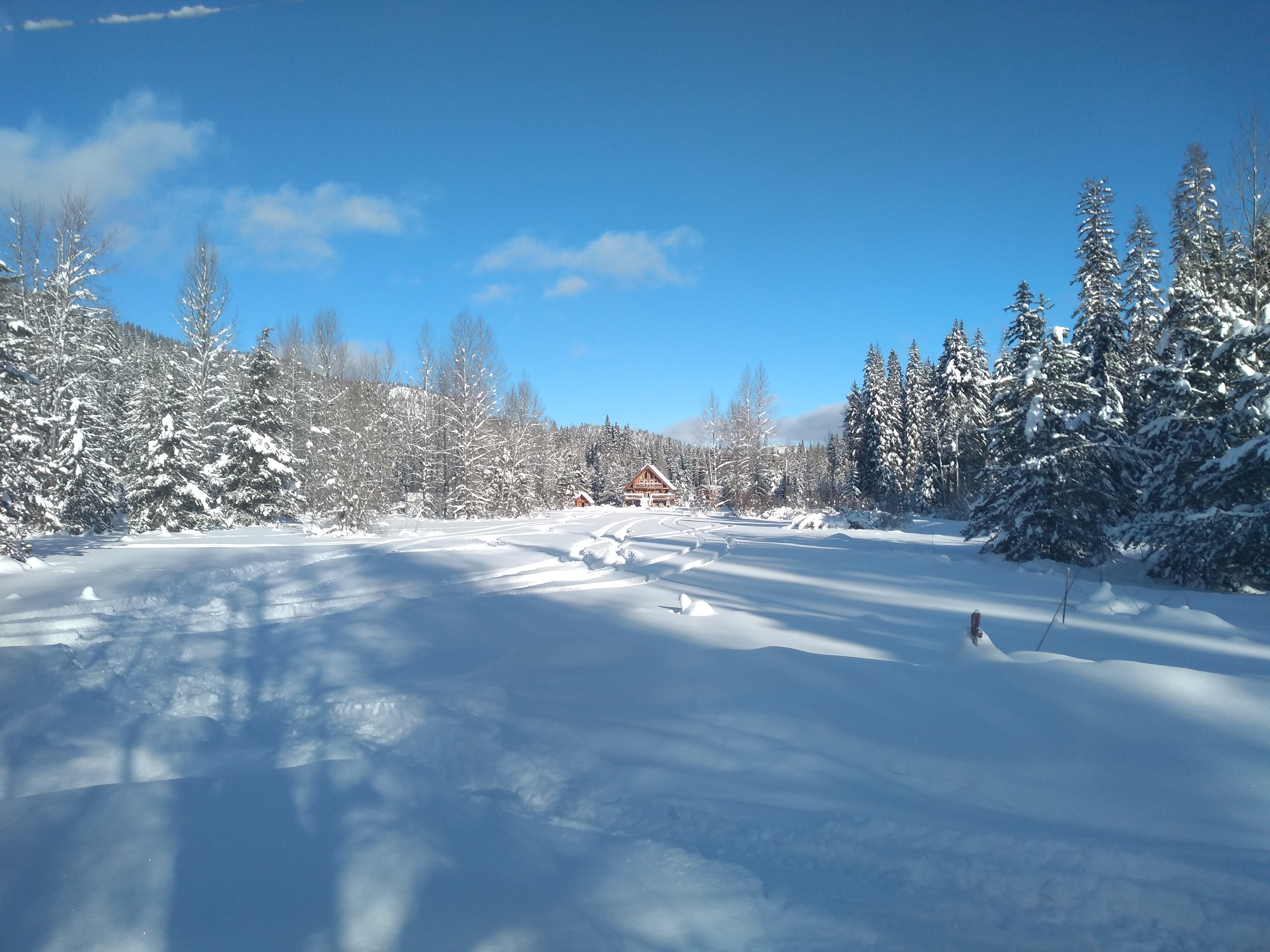

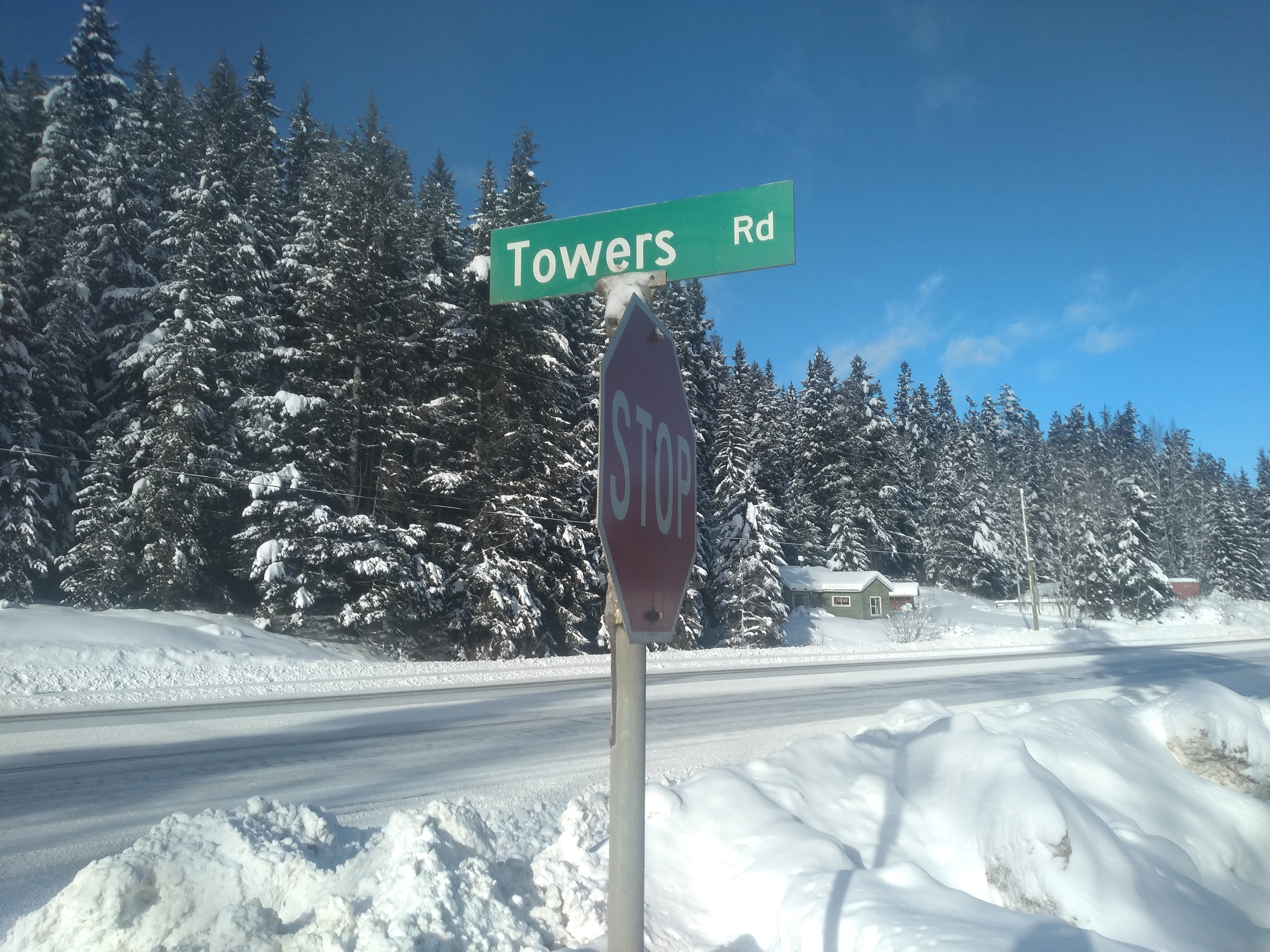

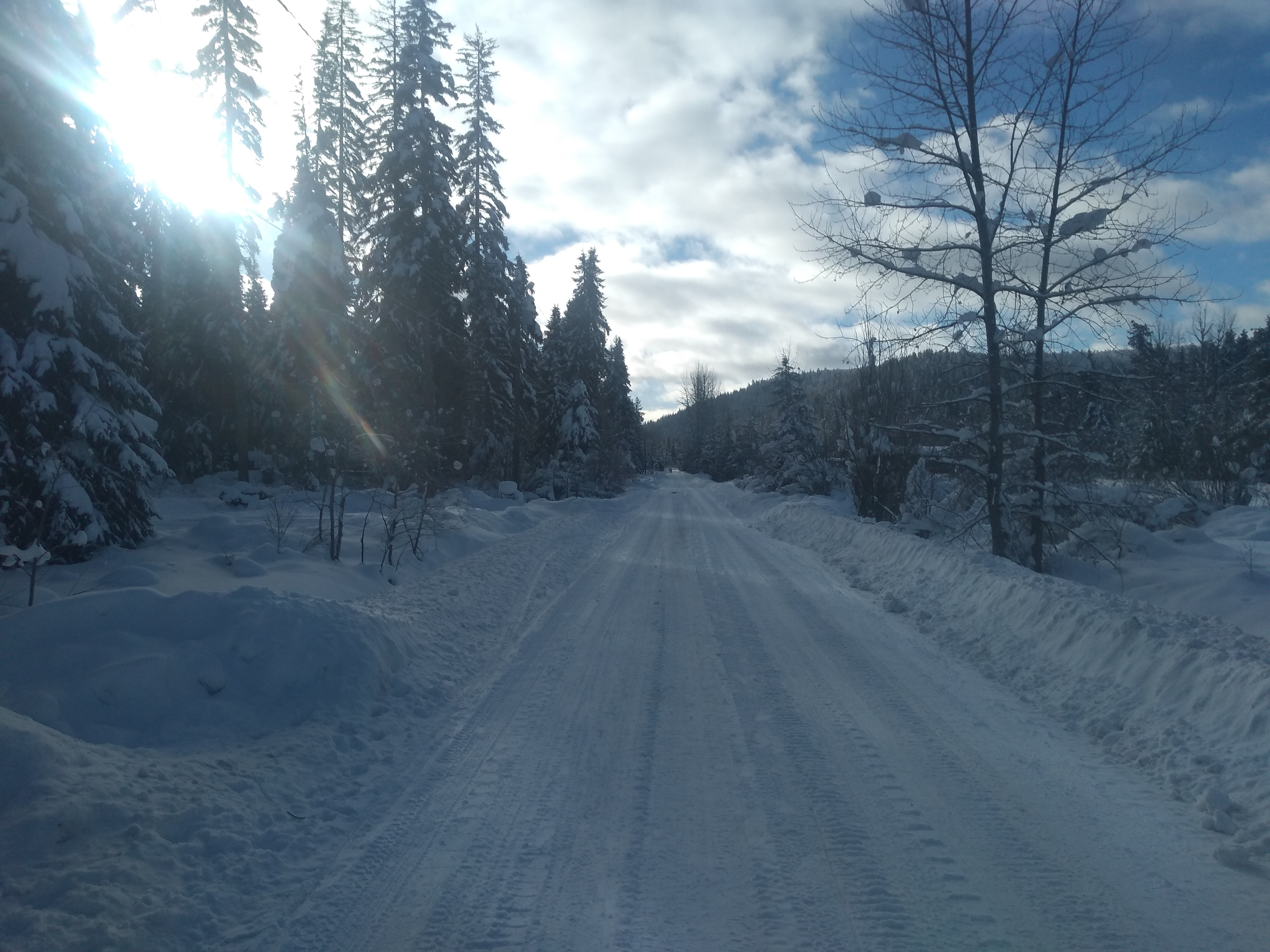

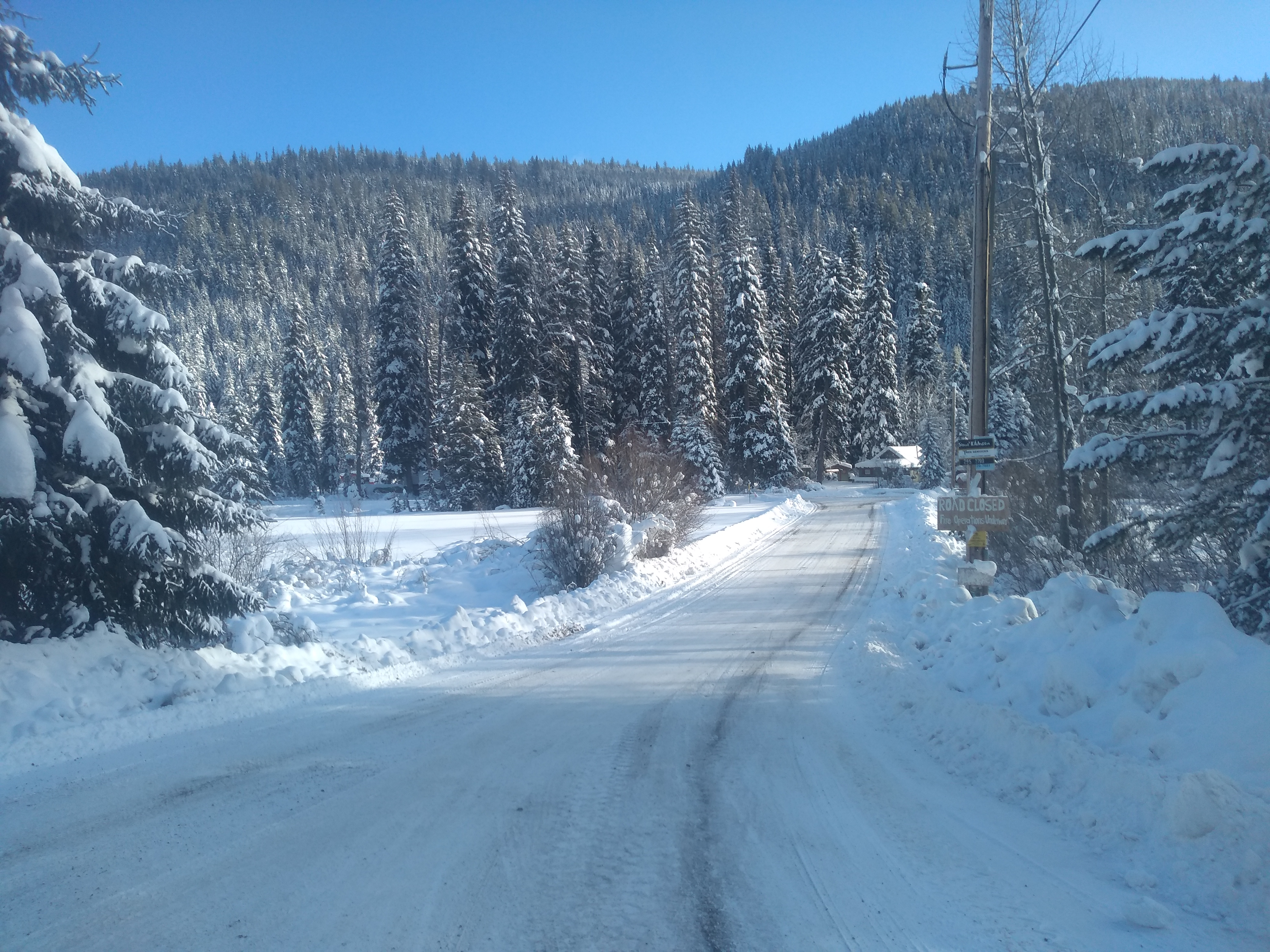

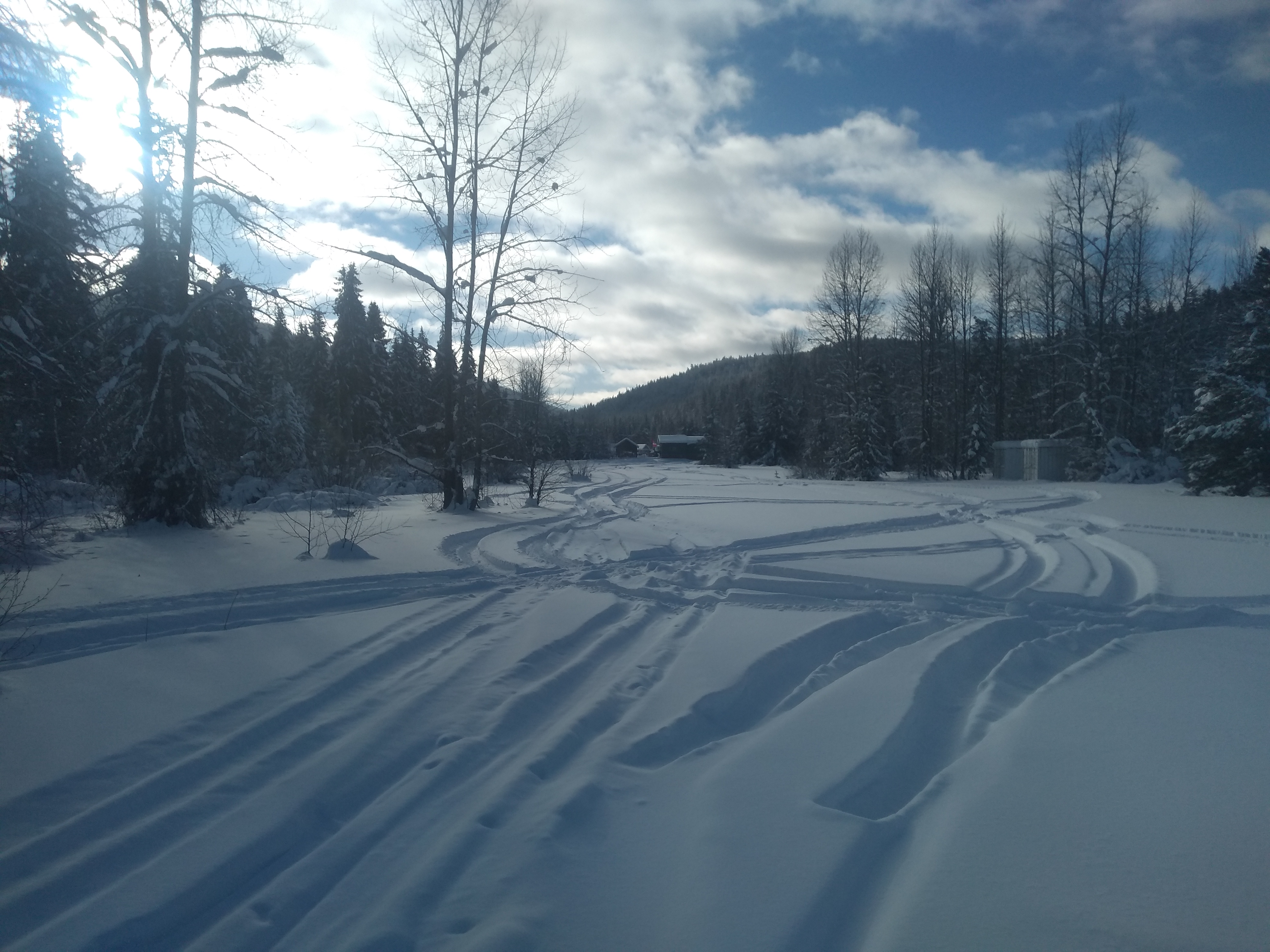

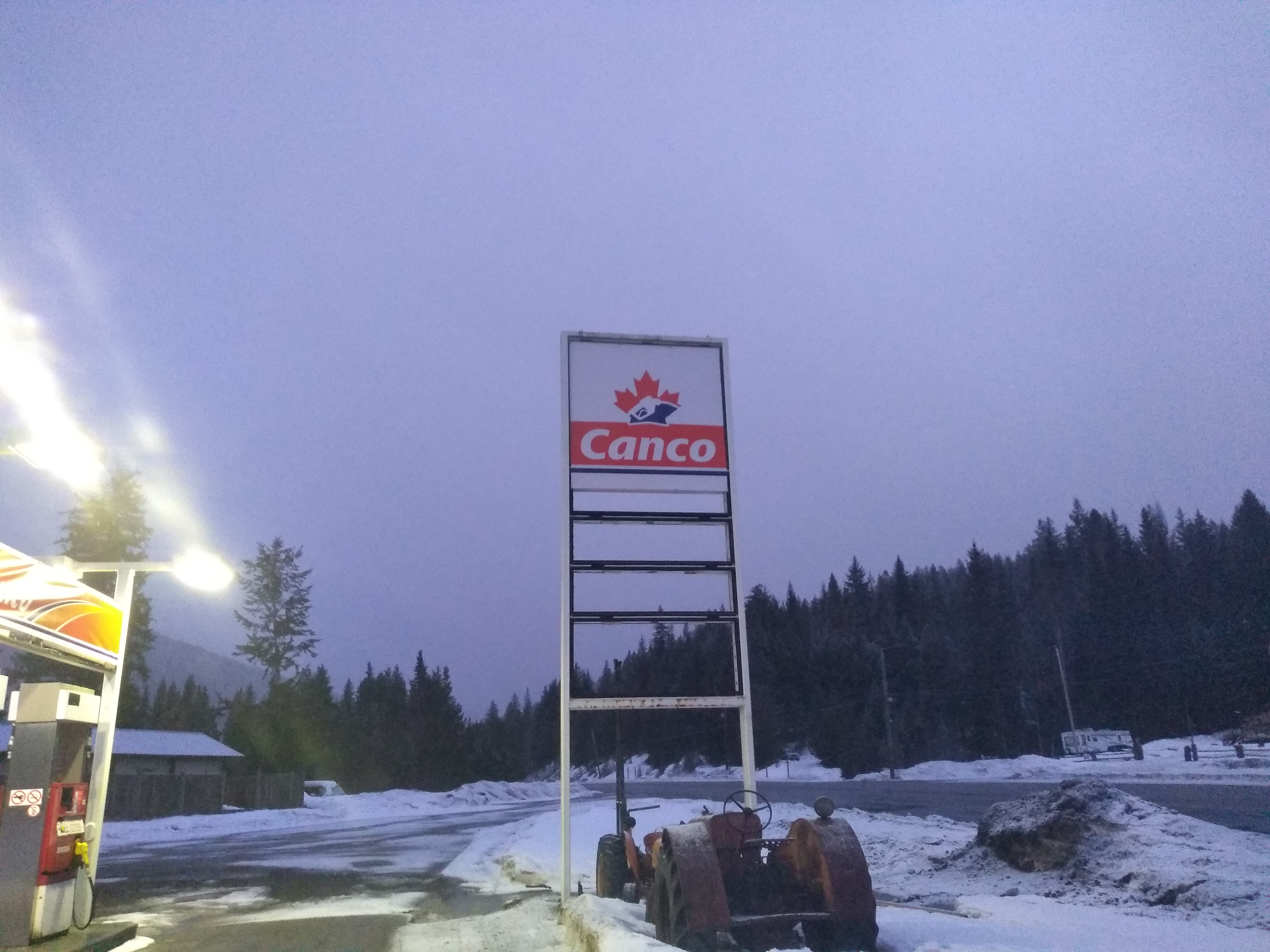

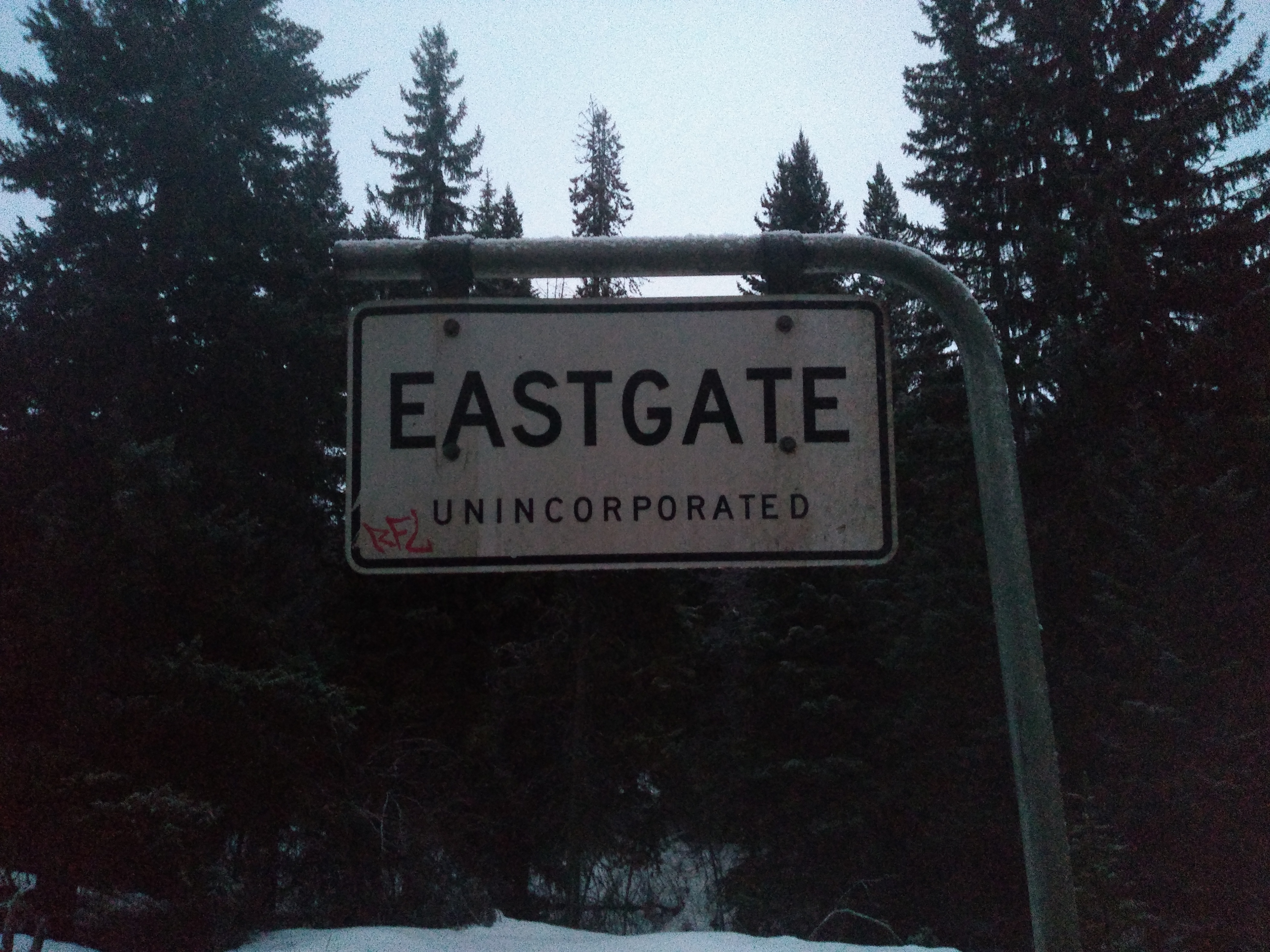
