= E. C. Manning Provincial Park =

Provincial park in British Columbia, Canada

- IUCN category II (national park)
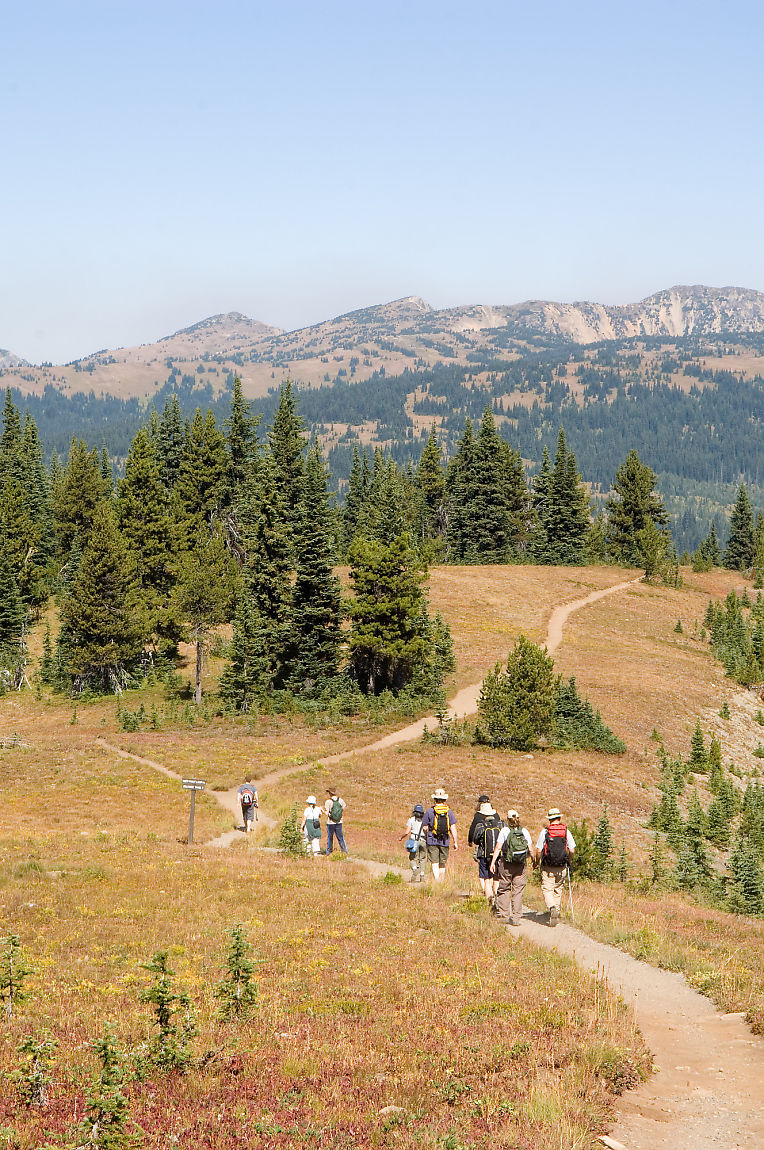
- Hiking the sub-alpine meadows in Manning Park

- Location within British Columbia
- Interactive map of E. C. Manning Provincial Park
- Location: British Columbia, Canada
- Nearest town: Hope, British Columbia and Princeton, British Columbia
- Coordinates: 49°4′0″N 120°47′0″W
- Area: 83,671 ha (206,760 acres)
- Established: 1941
- Visitors: 1.091 million (in 2017-18)
- Governing body: BC Parks
- Website: bcparks.ca/explore/parkpgs/ecmanning/

E.C. Manning Provincial Park is a provincial park in British Columbia, Canada. It is usually referred to as Manning Park, although that nomenclature is also used to refer to the resort and ski area at the park's core. The park covers 83,671 hectares (323 mi^{2}) and was the second most visited provincial park in 2017-18 after Cypress Provincial Park. The park lies along British Columbia Highway 3, and occupies a large amount of land between Hope and Princeton along the Canada-United States border.

== History ==
The earliest human use of the land was by the Coastal Native peoples of British Columbia, who, by travelling the route of the present-day Skyline Trail, accessed the Upper Similkameen Valley. The first European in the area was 1813 and was explored and mapped in 1827 by Archibald McDonald. Access to the area prior to the Great Depression was extremely limited for the lack of any kind of developed roads or trails over the Cascade Mountains other than the Dewdney Trail, far to the north. The earliest form of the park was established in 1931 as the Three Brothers Mountain Reserve to prevent overgrazing, and it eventually became the Three Brothers Game Reserve in 1936. In 1941, the park was formed as Three Brothers Mountain Park, a Class A Provincial Park.

In 1929, the construction of a road through the area was begun as a work project for the unemployed, but it did not get completed. When the Canadian government began to intern Japanese Canadians after the Attack on Pearl Harbor, one camp was formed in the present-day Sunshine Valley, and the workers built the current Hope-Princeton highway, which was completed in 1949. The current route of the Hope-Princeton highway follows the route of the Allison Pass Trail, which was constructed in 1859–1860. During the completion of the highway, great emphasis was put on the relatively new concept of the motoring family. The Parks Branch worked to great lengths to ensure the aesthetic quality of the vistas along the highway were maintained.

The park was named in memory of Ernest Callaway Manning, Chief Forester of British Columbia from 1936 to 1941 (not to be confused with Ernest Charles Manning, Premier of Alberta from 1943 to 1968). Manning was killed in an airplane accident in 1941. During his time as Chief Forester, he was instrumental in developing the idea of setting land aside for future generations to enjoy. It was the teamwork of Manning and Arthur Wellesley Gray, Minister of Lands from 1933 to 1944, that established Tweedsmuir Provincial Park, Hamber Provincial Park, Wells Gray Provincial Park, and E.C. Manning Provincial Park. Over the years, Manning Park has decreased in size, the most noticeable change being the park boundary in the east. Originally, the park included Similkameen Falls, but mine claims and private land ownership have since caused the boundaries to move more than 4 km (2.5 mi) west.

While the park's ecology and ecosystems remain relatively intact, logging has occurred numerous times throughout the park's history, as parks historically focused more on the visual qualities for the public rather than ecological conservation.

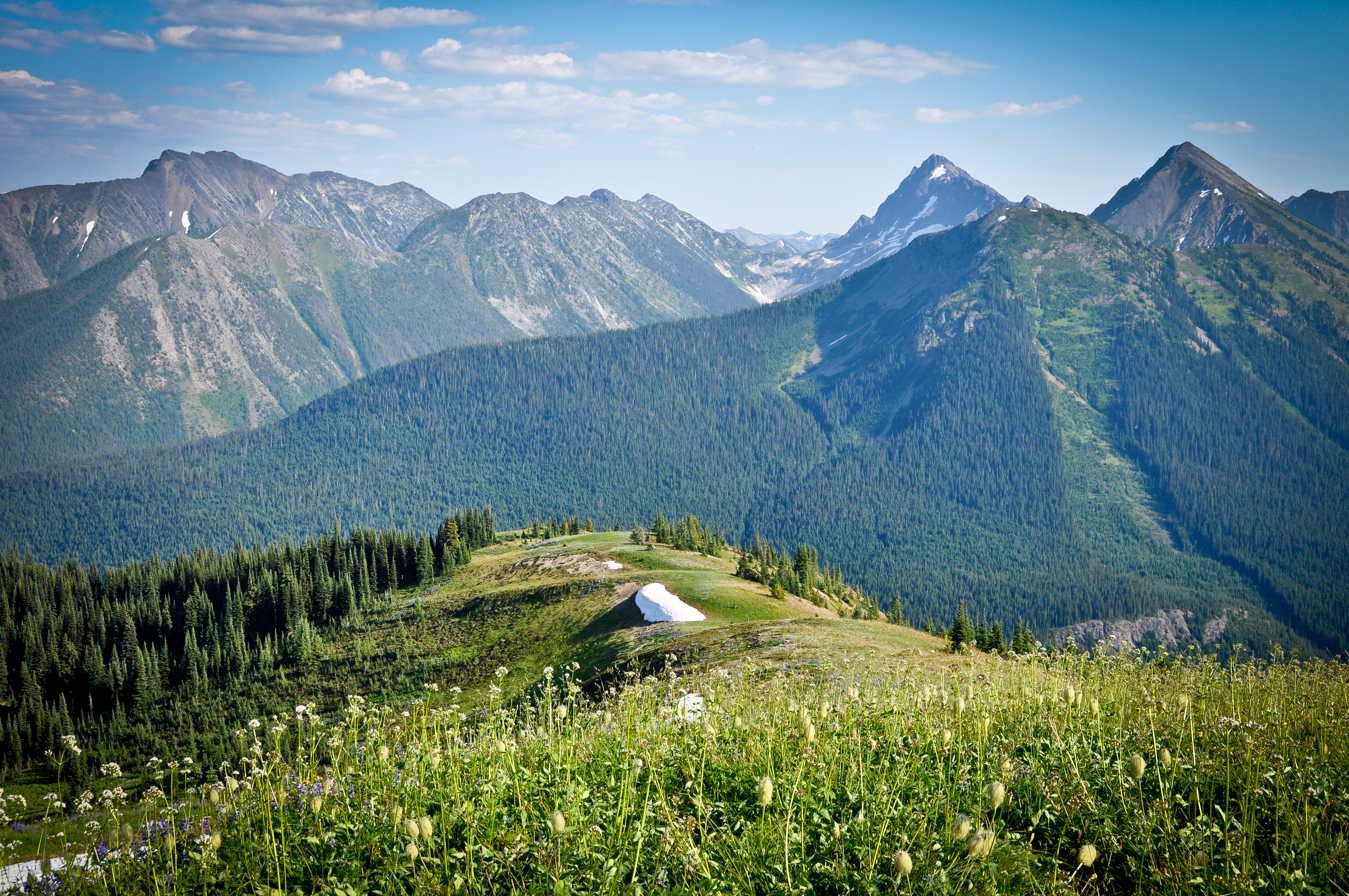
Hozameen Range from Snow Camp Mountain in E.C. Manning Provincial Park

== Geography ==
The terrain in the park, which includes most of the Hozameen Range sub-range of the Canadian Cascades, varies from wet coastal rain forests, to jagged snow-capped peaks, alpine meadows filled with wildflowers, to a chain of small lakes, and broad river beds along the valley floors. A network of trails crosses the park, some of them following routes used by the fur trade and native hunters and traders. The park is best known for its midsummer displays of subalpine flowers, but there are other flora such as at Rhododendron Flats, near the park's western entrance, which has a substantial colony of pinkish-red rhododendrons, a protected indigenous species that blooms in early- to mid-June.

== Manning Park Resort ==
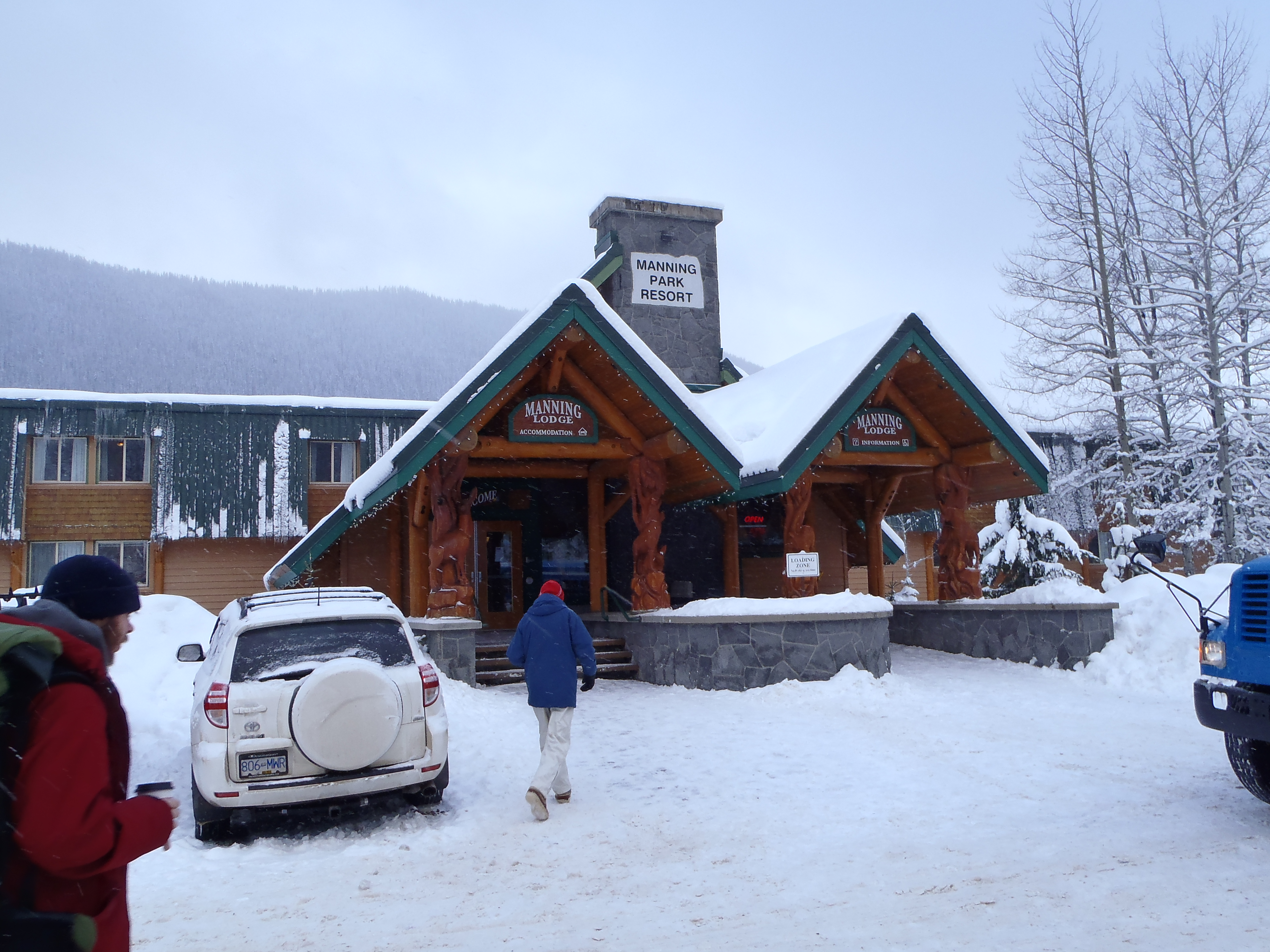
The main lodge building at Manning Park Resort

The park contains a resort with a capacity just below one thousand. The resort operator maintains the hotel buildings, restaurants, cabins, chalets, as well as the campgrounds, on contract from the British Columbia Government.

The Resort first opened in the late 1950s with the construction of the Hope-Princeton Highway. The original hotel building was a small motel near the current location of the Pinewoods Restaurant. Initially, the motorist's area was intended only for day use, including a restaurant and gas station, but quickly expanded. In its early years, there was internal debate about whether the core of the park should be more accessible to the general public, or more exclusive to limit access to only the well-educated and wealthy. The quickly rising popularity of the park lead to a focus on the former.

In the 1960s, the province began ski operations in Manning Park, attempting multiple rope-tow setups. The first was located directly across the highway from the restaurant and accessed from Blackwall Road, and the second near the location of the present-day Blue Chairlift. In 1967 and 1970, the Blue and Orange chairlifts opened, respectively. The hill has operated December–March yearly since the early 1960s. Today the resort manages Gibson Pass Ski Area. The resort was operated by the Provincial Government (along with other Ski Resorts in the Province) until 1986, when it and other then-provincially operated hills including Cypress Bowl and Mount Seymour transferred to private operation. A fifty year land use permit was granted for private operations.

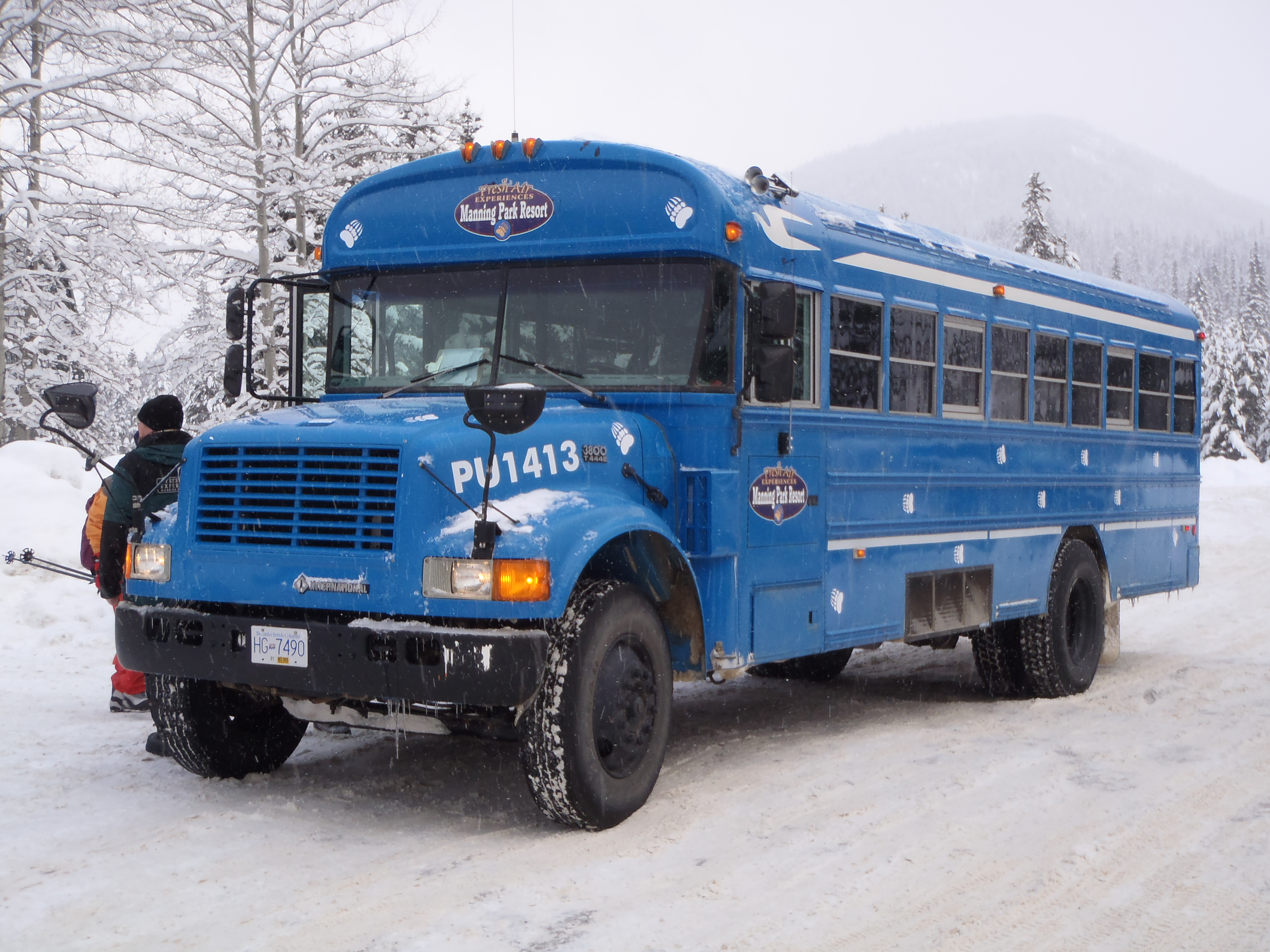
The free shuttle between the ski hill and the hotel, sporting the logo of Manning Park Resort as used until 2019

In 2009, the resort and ski hill entered receivership and, after $4.2 million of debt, announced indefinite closure on April 1, 2013. However, on April 18, the operator of Sunshine Valley RV Resort purchased the hill and resort for an undisclosed amount. The resort operations have now been fully restored. By the summer of 2013, the resort facilities were again fully operational, and the ski hill was fully opened for the 2015–2016 season. In April 2019, Manning Park Resort retired the Orange Chair, and completed construction of a new Doppelmayr quad chairlift named the Bear Chair, and new guest services building.

In the Spring of 2016, the resort began construction on its first expansion in a decade (the last being Loon Lagoon, the resort's indoor pool), with an addition being constructed on the restaurant to cater to the expanding popularity of Manning Park Resort as a wedding venue. As of December 2017, five new large rental cabins were completed to the immediate northwest of the main lodge, and another eight were completed in 2019.

== Recreation ==
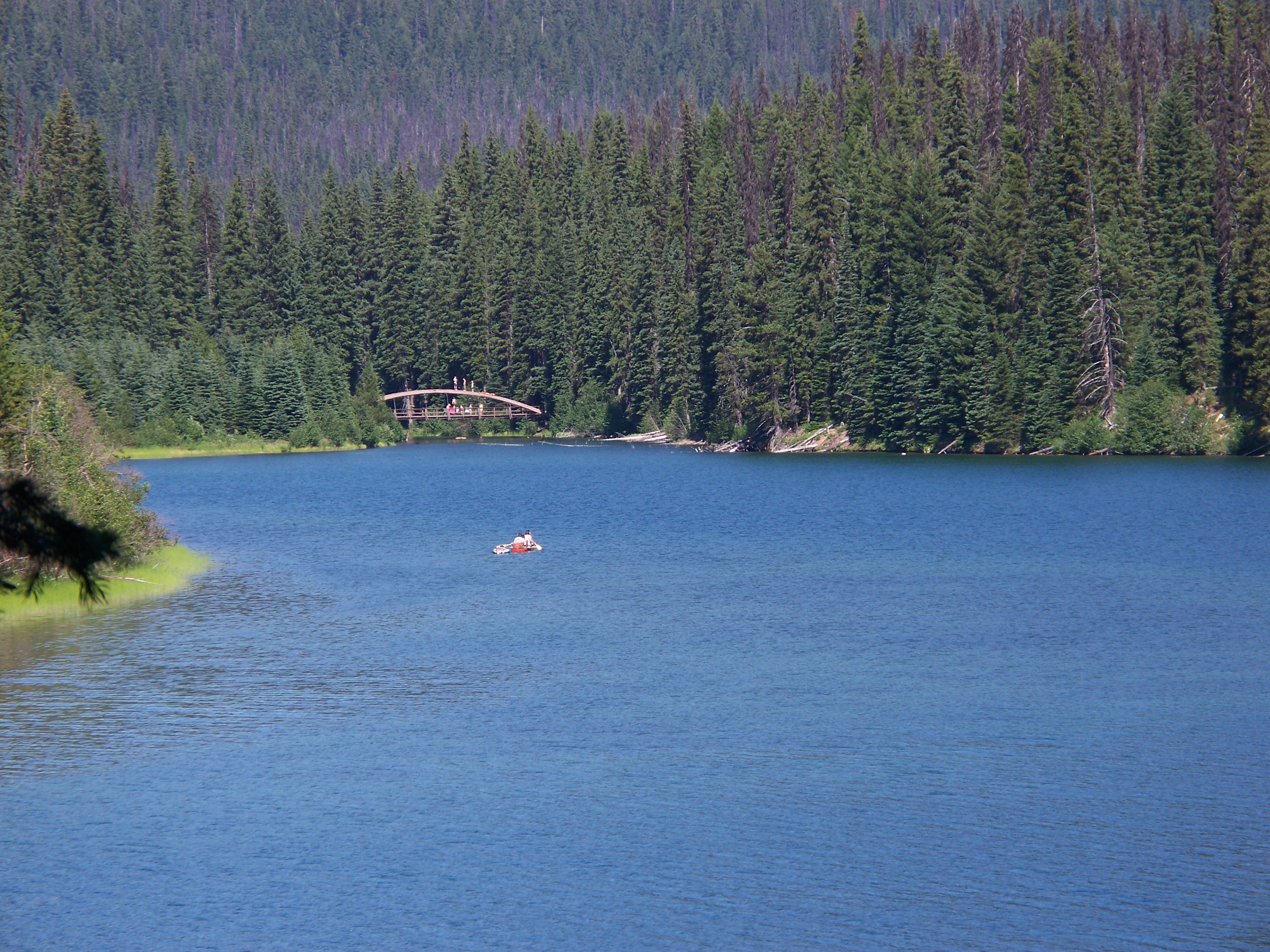

The park has a wide range of walking and hiking trails which range anywhere from a 15-minute walk to a 5 or 6 day hike. Lightning Lake is often used for non-motorized watersports, such as canoeing, kayaking, and fishing. Rentals are available at the lake for canoes, rowboats, kayaks and stand-up paddle boards. The best time of the day to go boating in the summer is in the morning before the afternoon winds. The park is home to many campgrounds, including one of the first campgrounds in the provincial system to be both open year-round as well as offer full RV hookup.

The park is the northern terminus of the Pacific Crest Trail and is crossed by the Hope Pass and Dewdney Trail. It is also crossed by the Centennial Trail, a route constructed in 1966 for the centennial anniversary of Canada's confederation.

== Location ==
The park stretches for 58 km (36 mi) from portal to portal. The western portal is 26 km (16 mi) east of Hope, British Columbia and the eastern portal is 52 km (32 mi) west of Princeton, British Columbia. The core area of the park is located 68 km (42 mi) east of Hope and 68 km west of Princeton and is less than 5 km (3 mi) from the US border.

== Wildlife ==
Manning Park is home to a vast diversity of wildlife species, with over 200 bird species recorded during the Manning Park Bird Blitzes that have taken place since 1983, and a large variety of mammals, including black bears, Mule Deer, Hoary Marmot, Yellow-bellied Marmot, and Columbian ground squirrels. There is also a large diversity of amphibians and reptiles, including the Coastal Tailed Frog, Columbia Spotted Frog, Western Toad, Pacific Treefrog, Long-toed Salamander, all three species of Gartersnake, and Alligator Lizard. Although undocumented, the Rubber Boa, Red-legged Frog, and Cascades Frog may also occur here. Some of the less common species the park aims to protect are the mountain beaver and the wolverine.

== Major rivers ==
Several major rivers originate in passes and meadows within the park. The Skagit River, a major stream that runs into Puget Sound in the state of Washington, originates at the west side of Allison Pass and flows northwest alongside Highway 3 until it reaches its confluence with the Sumallo River at Sumallo Grove, where it turns southwest and exits the park into Skagit Valley Provincial Park. Just under half of the Sumallo River's course is within the park; it enters the park at West Gate, which is near the small town of Sunshine Valley. It too follows Highway 3 within the park, following it southeast to its confluence with the Skagit. The lower reaches of the small Skaist River, often mistakenly called Skaist Creek, are within the park. The Skaist flows into the Skagit directly across the valley from Silverdaisy Mountain.

The Similkameen River, the largest tributary of the Okanagan River, starts on the west slopes of Nicomen Ridge in the northern regions of the park and flows southeast then northeast through the park, following Highway 3 closely until exiting the park at East Gate.

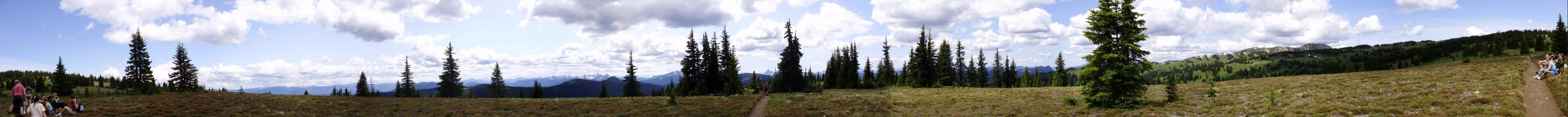

== See also ==
- Cathedral Provincial Park and Protected Area
- Cascade Recreation Area
- North Cascades National Park
- Pasayten Wilderness
- Eastgate, British Columbia
- Gibson Pass Ski Area
- Frosty Mountain, highest point in Manning
