= Cascade Recreation Area =

Provincial Recreation Area in British Columbia, Canada

- Location within British Columbia
- Nearest city: Princeton
- Coordinates: 49°16′00″N 120°56′00″W
- Area: 11,858 ha (45.78 sq mi)
- Established: March 14, 1987
- Disestablished: May 31, 2012

The Cascade Recreation Area was a Provincial Recreation Area in the Hozameen Range of the Cascade Mountains of British Columbia, Canada, located north of the E.C. Manning Provincial Park, which it was merged into on May 31, 2012. It is roughly 11,858 ha. and was created on March 14, 1987. The recreation area has limited road access and is used by hikers, horse riders, mountain bikers and, in winter, snowmobilers. The nearest towns are Hope and Princeton.
