= Lightning Lake =

Lake in British Columbia, Canada

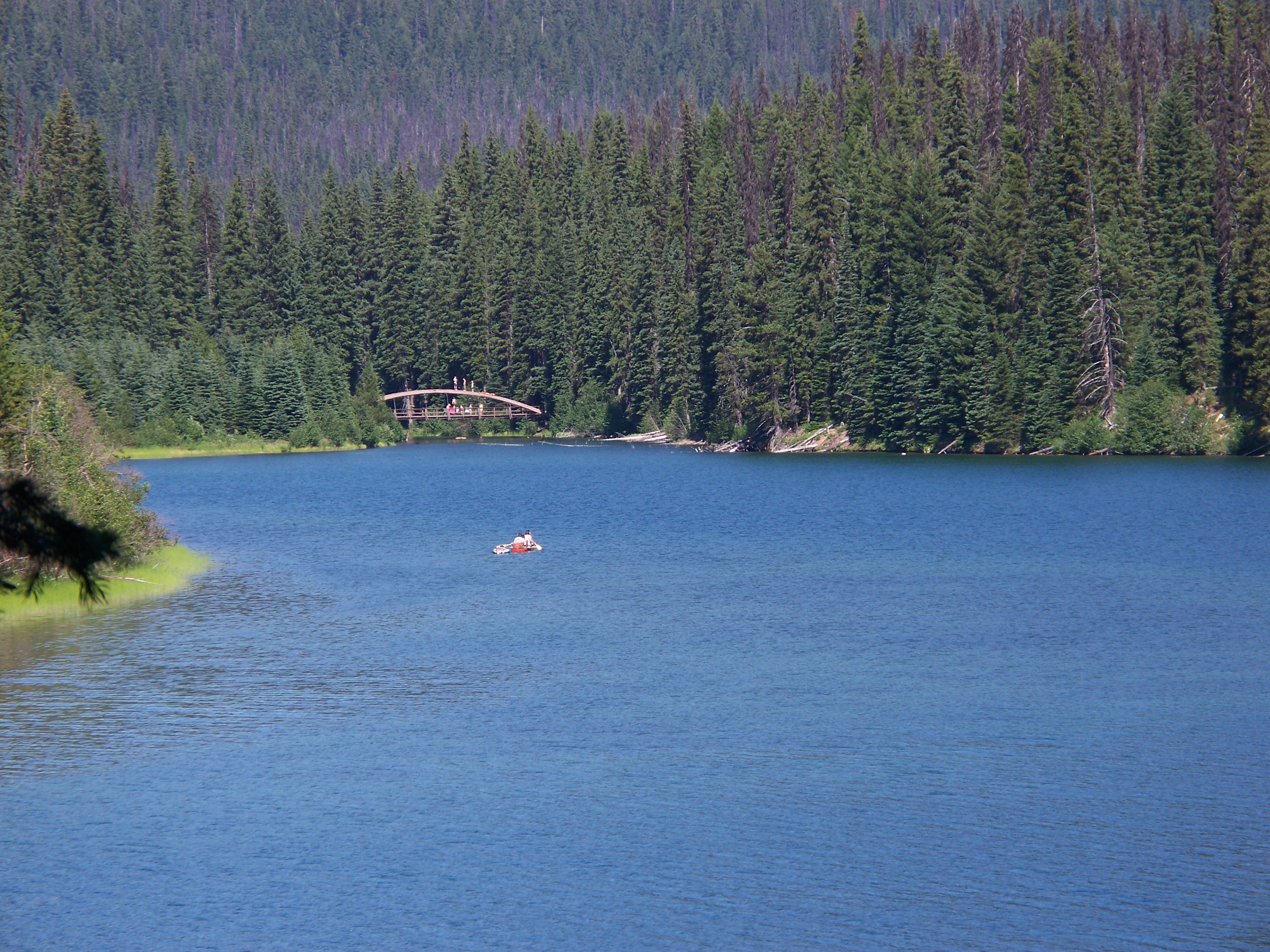
- Lightning Lake (from Southeast) with Rainbow Bridge crossing the narrows

- Location within British Columbia
- Location: British Columbia, Canada
- Coordinates: 49°3′43.45″N 120°49′45.12″W
- Primary outflows: Similkameen River
- Basin countries: Canada
- Average depth: 3 m (9.8 ft)
- Max. depth: 8 m (26 ft)
- Surface elevation: 1,247 m (4,091 ft)

Lightning Lake is a lake located in E. C. Manning Provincial Park, British Columbia, Canada. The lake is freshwater and is located within the Similkameen-Okanagan forest district. The lake is unusual as it drains in two directions, into Flash Lake in the south and the Similkameen River to the north. The current lake is not a naturally occurring lake, as at the north end, near the day-use area, there is an earthen dam. The lake is very shallow and near the end of the summer season, the narrows under the Rainbow Bridge are either very shallow or dry.

== Recreation ==
Lightning Lake is the mains summer tourism feature within Manning Park. Both canoes and rowboats are available for rental from the day-use area. The lake provides a paved boat launch; however, powercraft and jet-skis are prohibited on the lake. Parking at the lake free for all vehicles, and overnight parking is permitted as there are back-country campgrounds located at multiple locations along the Lightning Lakes chain. Fishing is permitted within the park.

=== Hiking ===
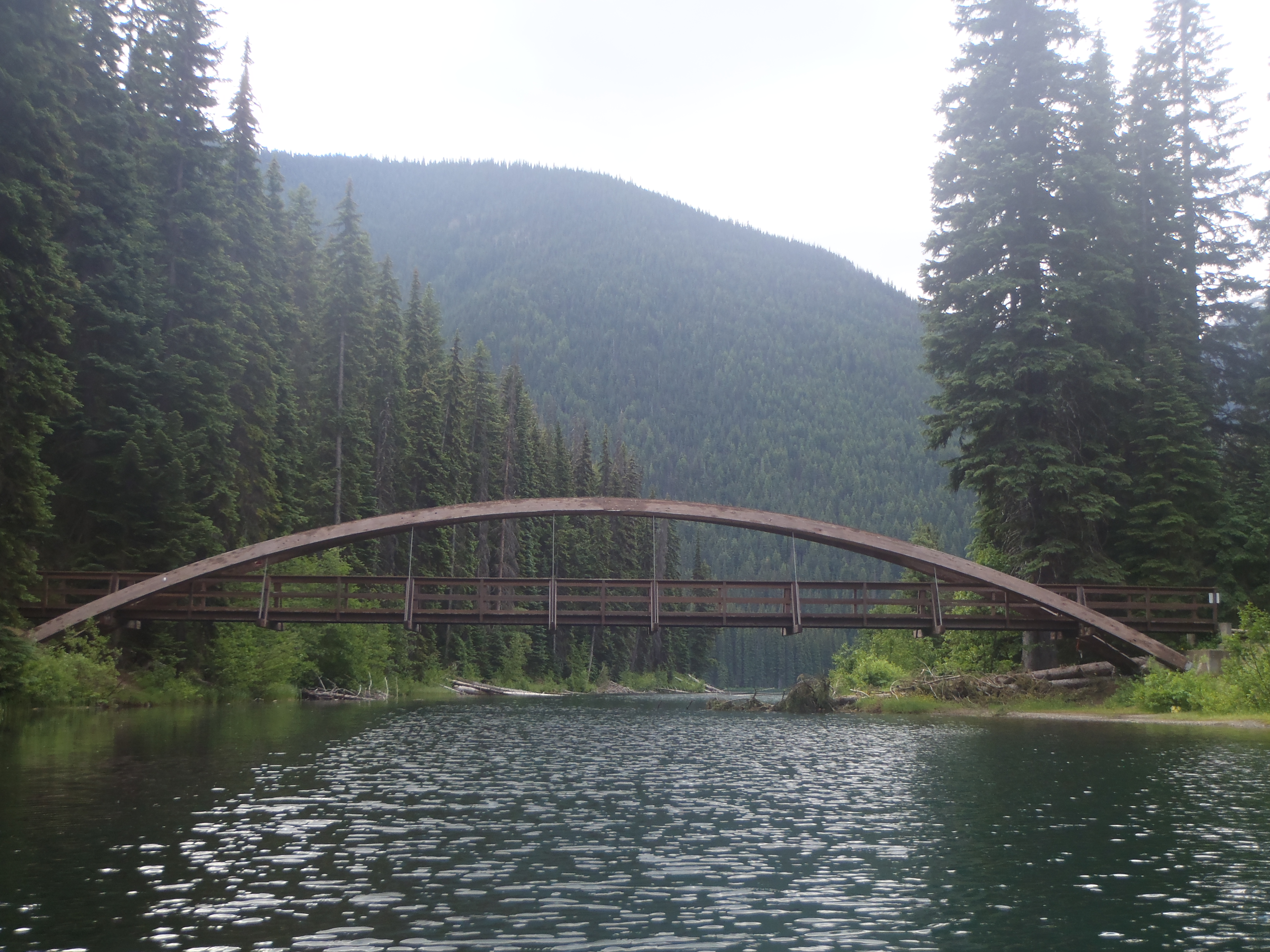
Rainbow Bridge, crossing the narrows of the lake.

The lake is skirted by a 9 km level-grade hiking-only trail, which can be halved by taking the Rainbow Bridge at the narrows of the lake. The day-use parking area serves also as a parking area for the Windy Joe, Mount Frosty, and Lightning Lakes Chain hike.

=== Camping ===
There are two drive-in camping areas, maintained by Manning Park Resort for BC Parks, on Lightning Lake. The first is Lone Duck Group Camp, which is open year-round, and the Lightning Lake Campground, which is a trailer-camping facility with flush toilets. There are no hike-in campgrounds on Lightning Lake due to its proximity to roads.

== Lightning Lakes Chain ==
Lightning Lake is the first of the four lakes on the Lightning Lakes chain, all of which are located within E. C. Manning Provincial Park. The entire chain is accessible by maintained hiking trails and there are campgrounds on the other lakes.

- Lightning Lake
- Flash Lake
- Strike Lake
- Thunder Lake

== See also ==
- List of lakes of British Columbia
