= Sentinel Peak (Alaska) =

Mountain in Alaska, United States

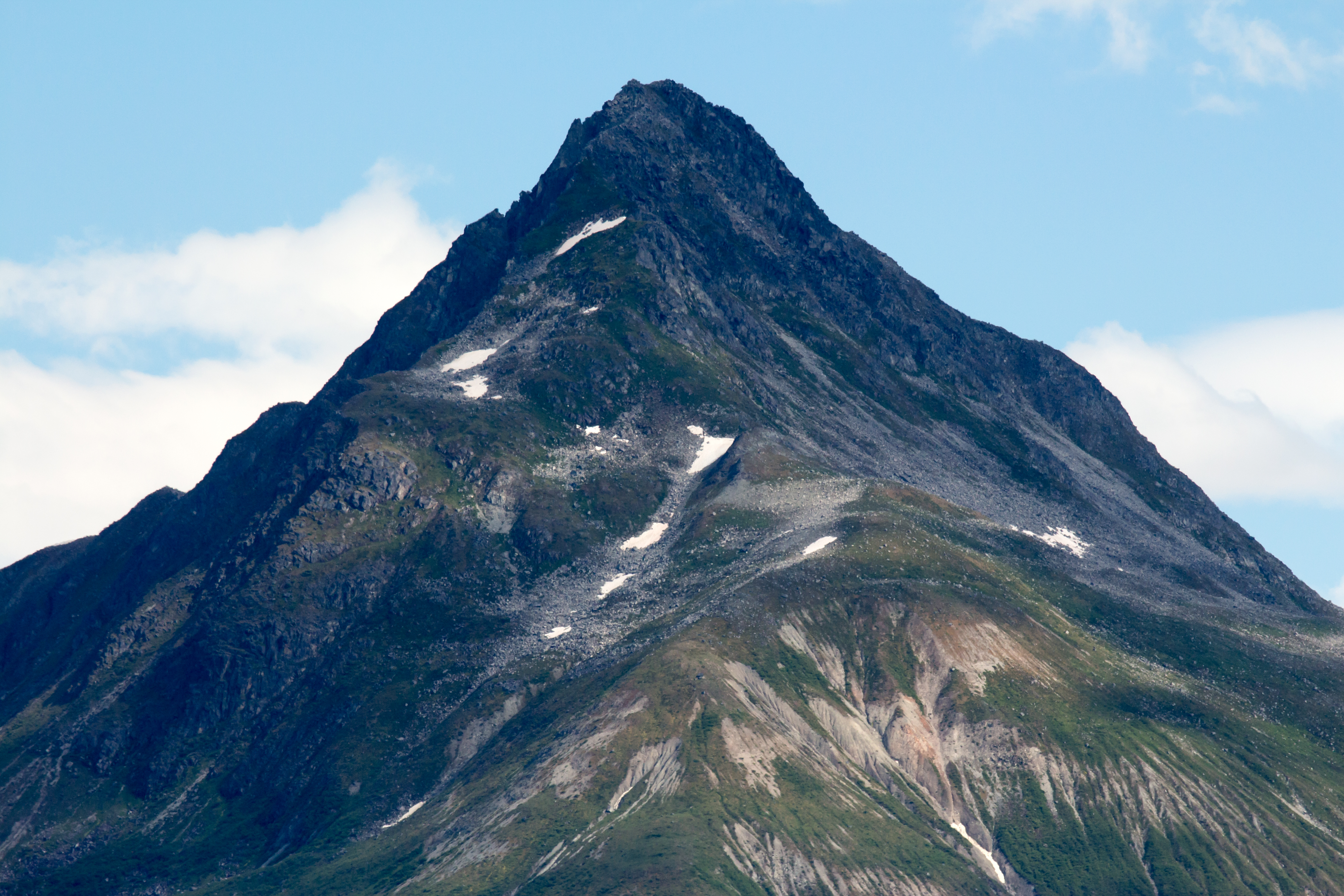
- Sentinel Peak, south aspect

Highest point
- Elevation: 4,355 ft (1,327 m)
- Prominence: 1,710 ft (520 m)
- Parent peak: Rendu Peak (5341ft)
- Coordinates: 58°59′34″N 136°33′45″W

Geography
- Location within Alaska
- Interactive map of Sentinel Peak
- Location: Glacier Bay National Park; Hoonah-Angoon; Alaska, United States
- Parent range: Alsek Ranges; Saint Elias Mountains
- Topo map: USGS Mount Fairweather D-2

Climbing
- Easiest route: South ridge

Sentinel Peak is a 4,355-foot (1,327-meter) mountain summit located at the head of Glacier Bay's Queen Inlet in Glacier Bay National Park and Preserve, in the Alsek Ranges of the Saint Elias Mountains, in southeast Alaska. The mountain is situated immediately southwest of Carroll Glacier, 87 mi (140 km) northwest of Juneau, and 7.44 mi (12 km) east of Mount Abdallah. Although modest in elevation, relief is significant since the mountain rises up from tidewater in less than two miles. The mountain was named in 1892 by Harry Fielding Reid, an American geophysicist, who studied glaciology in Glacier Bay. He so named it because Carroll Glacier is guarded by Sentinel Peak, and a sentinel is a guard whose job is to stand and keep watch. Weather permitting, Sentinel Peak can be seen from Glacier Bay, which is a popular destination for cruise ships. The months May through June offer the most favorable weather for viewing or climbing the peak.

== Climate ==
Based on the Köppen climate classification, Sentinel Peak has a subarctic climate with cold, snowy winters, and mild summers. Winter temperatures can drop below −20 °C with wind chill factors below −30 °C. Precipitation runoff from the mountain drains into Glacier Bay Basin.

== Gallery ==
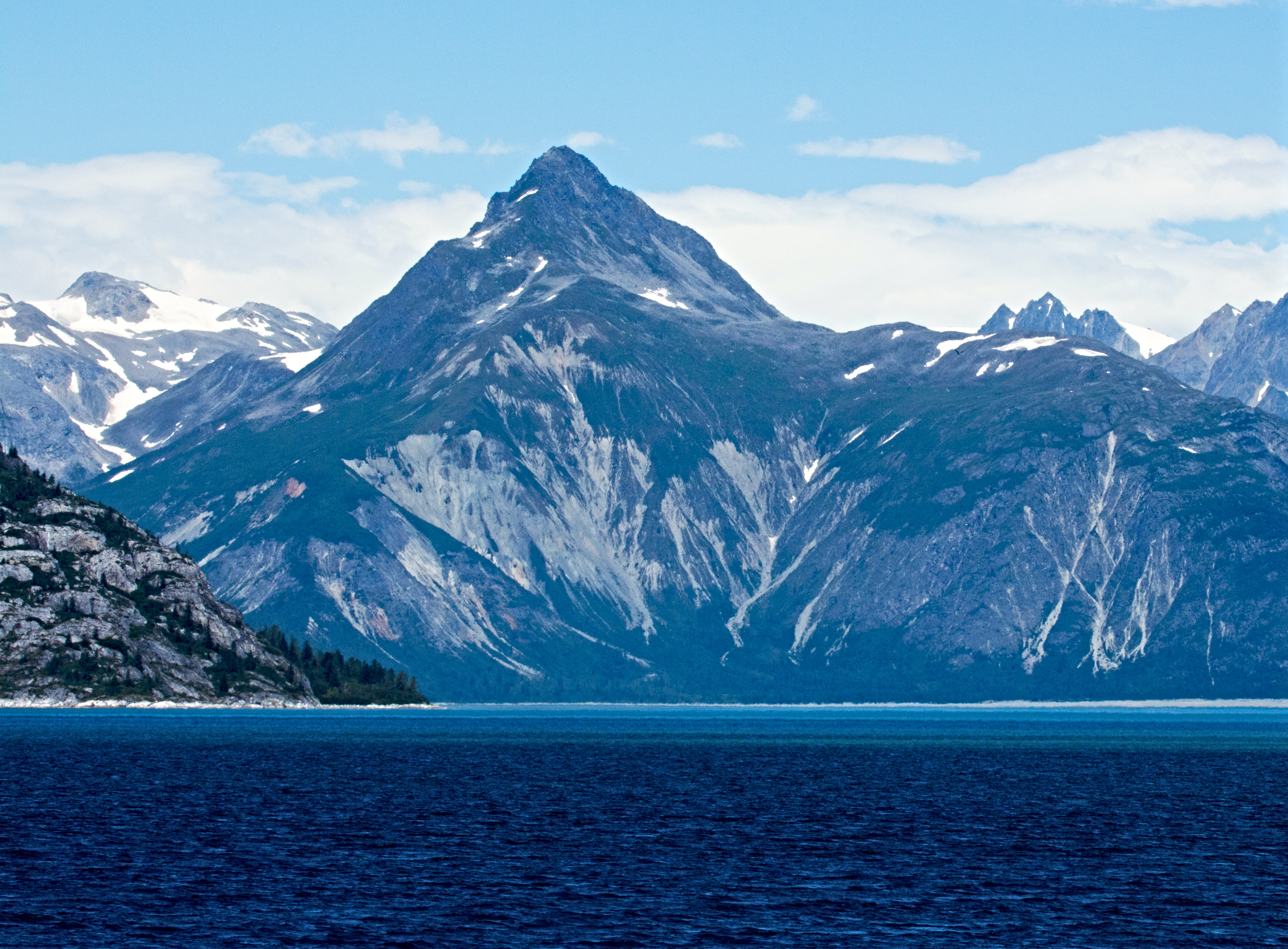
Sentinel Peak at the head of Queen Inlet

== See also ==
- List of mountain peaks of Alaska
- Geography of Alaska
