= Mount Wordie =

Mountain in Alaska, United States

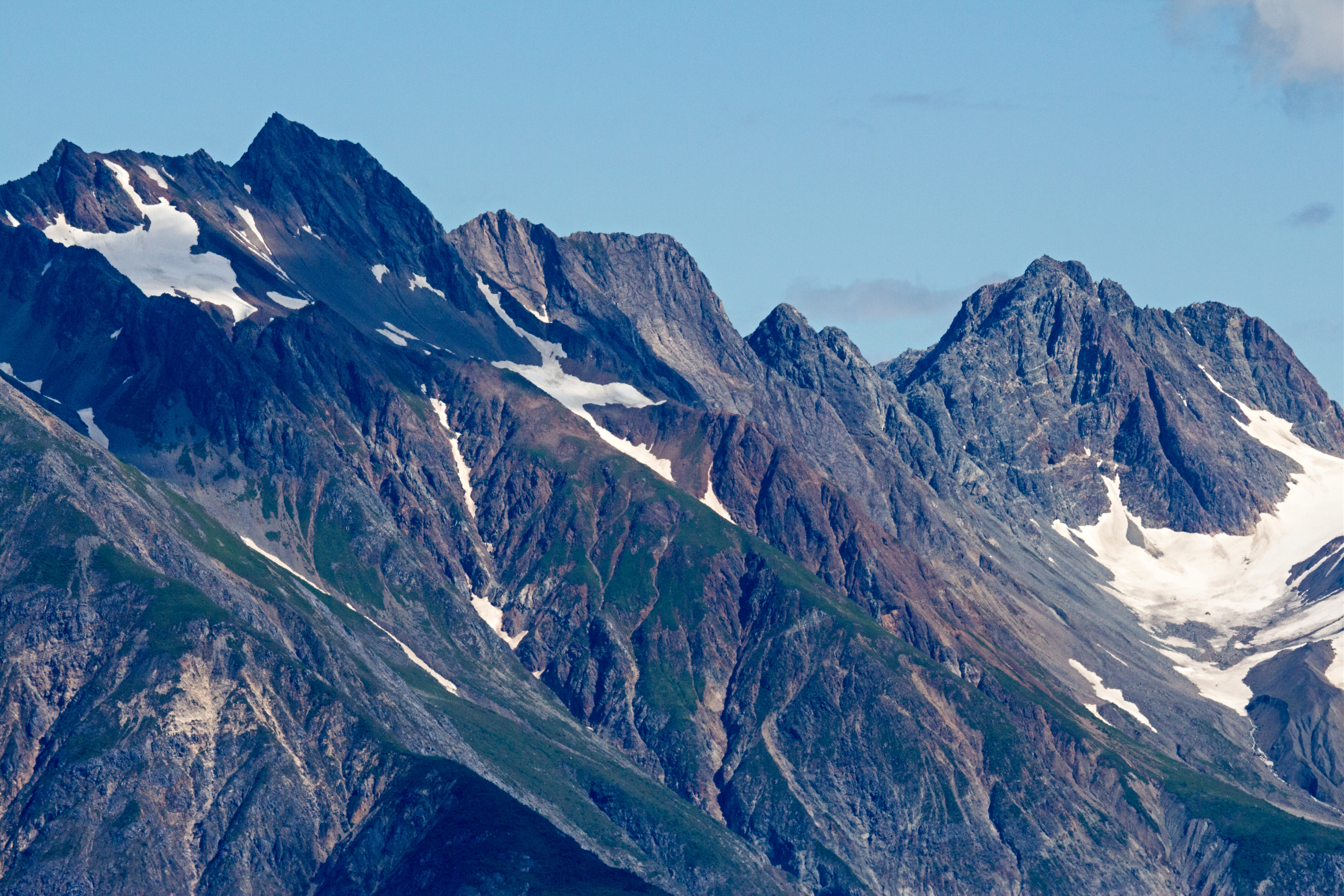
- Mount Wordie, west aspect (summit at upper left)

Highest point
- Elevation: 4,700 ft (1,400 m)
- Prominence: 1,046 ft (319 m)
- Parent peak: Mount Merriam (5,083 ft)
- Isolation: 1.28 mi (2.06 km)
- Coordinates: 58°56′27″N 136°28′30″W

Geography
- Location within Alaska
- Interactive map of Mount Wordie
- Location: Glacier Bay National Park; Hoonah-Angoon; Alaska, United States
- Parent range: Takhinsha Mountains; Alsek Ranges; Saint Elias Mountains
- Topo map: USGS Mount Fairweather D-2

Climbing
- Easiest route: South slope, West ridge

Mount Wordie is a 4,700+ foot (1,433+ meter) mountain summit located in Glacier Bay National Park and Preserve, in the Alsek Ranges of the Saint Elias Mountains, in southeast Alaska. The mountain is situated 80 mi (129 km) northwest of Juneau, 4 mi (6 km) south of Carroll Glacier, and 3.1 mi (5 km) north of Mount Merriam which is the nearest higher peak. Although modest in elevation, relief is significant as the mountain rises up from tidewater in less than two miles. Precipitation runoff from the mountain drains into Glacier Bay Basin. Weather permitting, Mount Wordie can be seen from Queen Inlet and Wachusett Inlet of Glacier Bay, which is a popular destination for cruise ships.

== Etymology ==
The mountain was named by members of a 1941 Glacier Bay expedition for James Mann Wordie (1889-1962), a Scottish polar explorer, glacier geologist, and President of the Royal Geological Society from 1951 through 1954. Wordie visited nearby Muir Glacier in Glacier Bay in 1913.

== Climate ==
Based on the Köppen climate classification, Mount Wordie has a subarctic climate with cold, snowy winters, and mild summers. Winter temperatures can drop below −20 °C with wind chill factors below −30 °C. The months May through June offer the most favorable weather for viewing or climbing the peak.

== Gallery ==
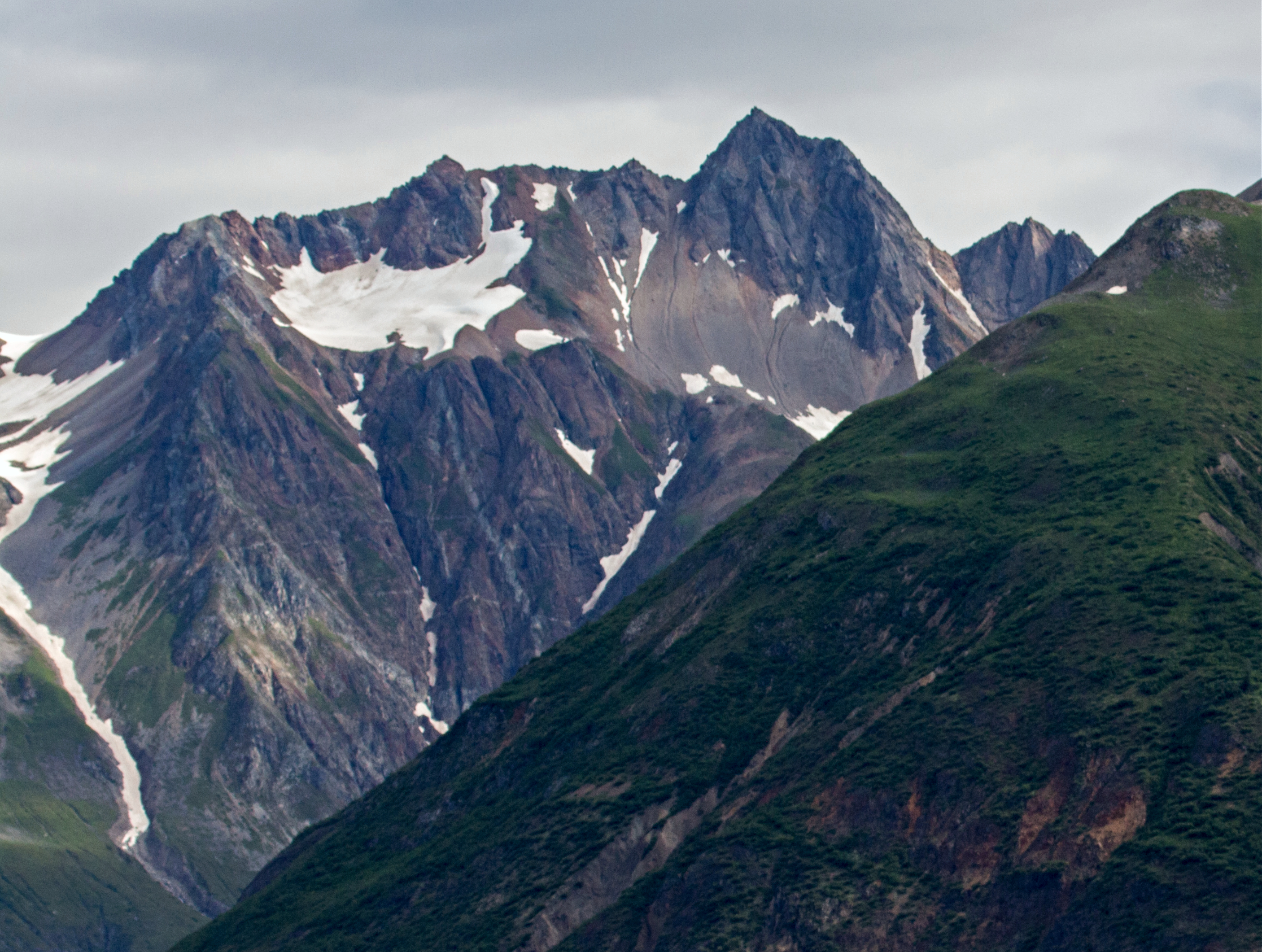
Mt. Wordie from southwest

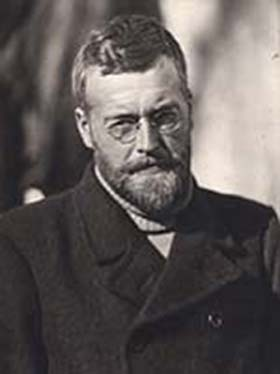
James Wordie

== See also ==
- List of mountain peaks of Alaska
- Geography of Alaska
