= McLeod Mountain =

Mountain in Washington (state), United States

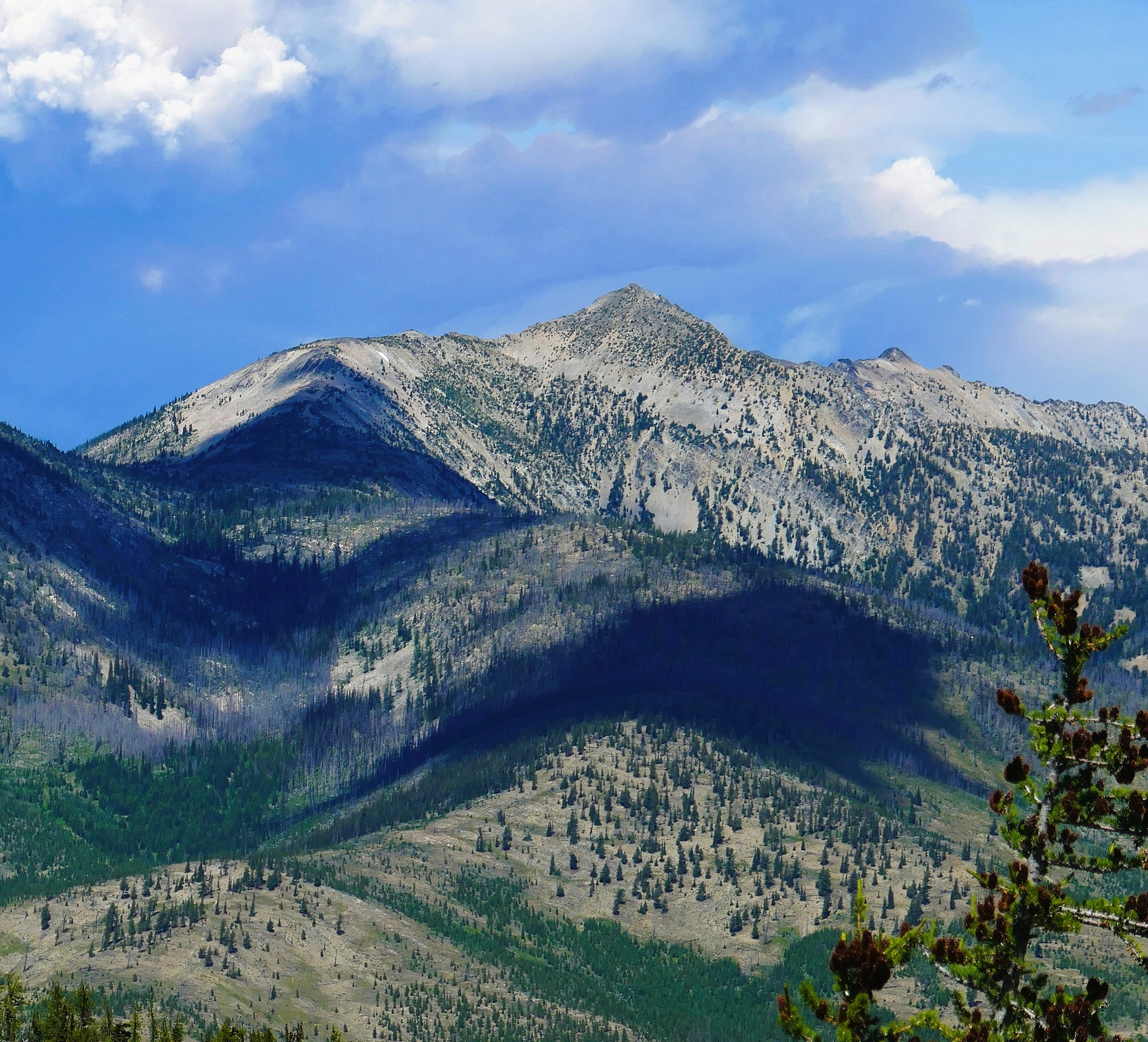
- South aspect, viewed from Goat Peak

Highest point
- Elevation: 8,102 ft (2,469 m)
- Prominence: 585 ft (178 m)
- Parent peak: Sunrise Peak (8,150 ft)
- Isolation: 1.87 mi (3.01 km)
- Coordinates: 48°42′16″N 120°23′03″W

Naming
- Etymology: Angus McLeod

Geography
- Location within Washington (state) Location within the United States
- Interactive map of McLeod Mountain
- Country: United States
- State: Washington
- County: Okanogan
- Protected area: Pasayten Wilderness
- Parent range: Okanogan Range; North Cascades; Cascade Range
- Topo map: USGS McLeod Mountain

Climbing
- First ascent: 1904 by E.C. Barnard
- Easiest route: Scrambling

McLeod Mountain is an 8,102-foot (2,469-metre) summit in Okanogan County, Washington state, USA.

== Description ==
McLeod Mountain is part of the Okanogan Range which is a subrange of the North Cascades. The mountain is situated eight miles (13 km) north of Mazama, on the southeast boundary of the Pasayten Wilderness, on land managed by the Okanogan–Wenatchee National Forest. Precipitation runoff from McLeod Mountain drains east to Goat Creek and west to Lost River which are both tributaries of the Methow River. An ascent of the mountain involves seven miles of off-trail hiking with 2,800 feet of elevation gain. The peak ranks as the 189th-highest in the state and 66th-highest in Okanogan County. The nearest higher peak is Sunrise Peak, two miles (3.2 km) to the north.

== History ==
The peak was first climbed in 1904 by Edward Chester Barnard of the International Boundary Survey and used as a triangulation station. The peak was originally called Goat Peak in 1916, changed to McLeod Peak in 1929, and revised to McLeod Mountain in 1978. The mountain's name honors Methow Valley pioneer Angus Oliver McLeod (March 14, 1847 – July 12, 1928), and the toponym has been officially adopted by the United States Board on Geographic Names. Angus had a hotel, bar, boarding house, and manned the post office for 15 years. The mountain was the scene of a top priority wildfire in the nation in 2018.

== Climate ==
Weather fronts originating in the Pacific Ocean travel northeast toward the Cascade Mountains. As fronts approach the North Cascades, they are forced upward by the peaks of the Cascade Range (orographic lift), causing them to drop their moisture in the form of rain or snowfall onto the Cascades. As a result, the west side of the North Cascades experiences higher precipitation than the east side, especially during the winter months in the form of snowfall. During winter months, weather is usually cloudy, but due to high pressure systems over the Pacific Ocean that intensify during summer months, there is often little or no cloud cover during the summer. The months of May through October offer the most favorable weather for visiting this mountain; however, smoke from distant wildfires may potentially reduce visibility, and smoky summer conditions have been increasing with climate change.

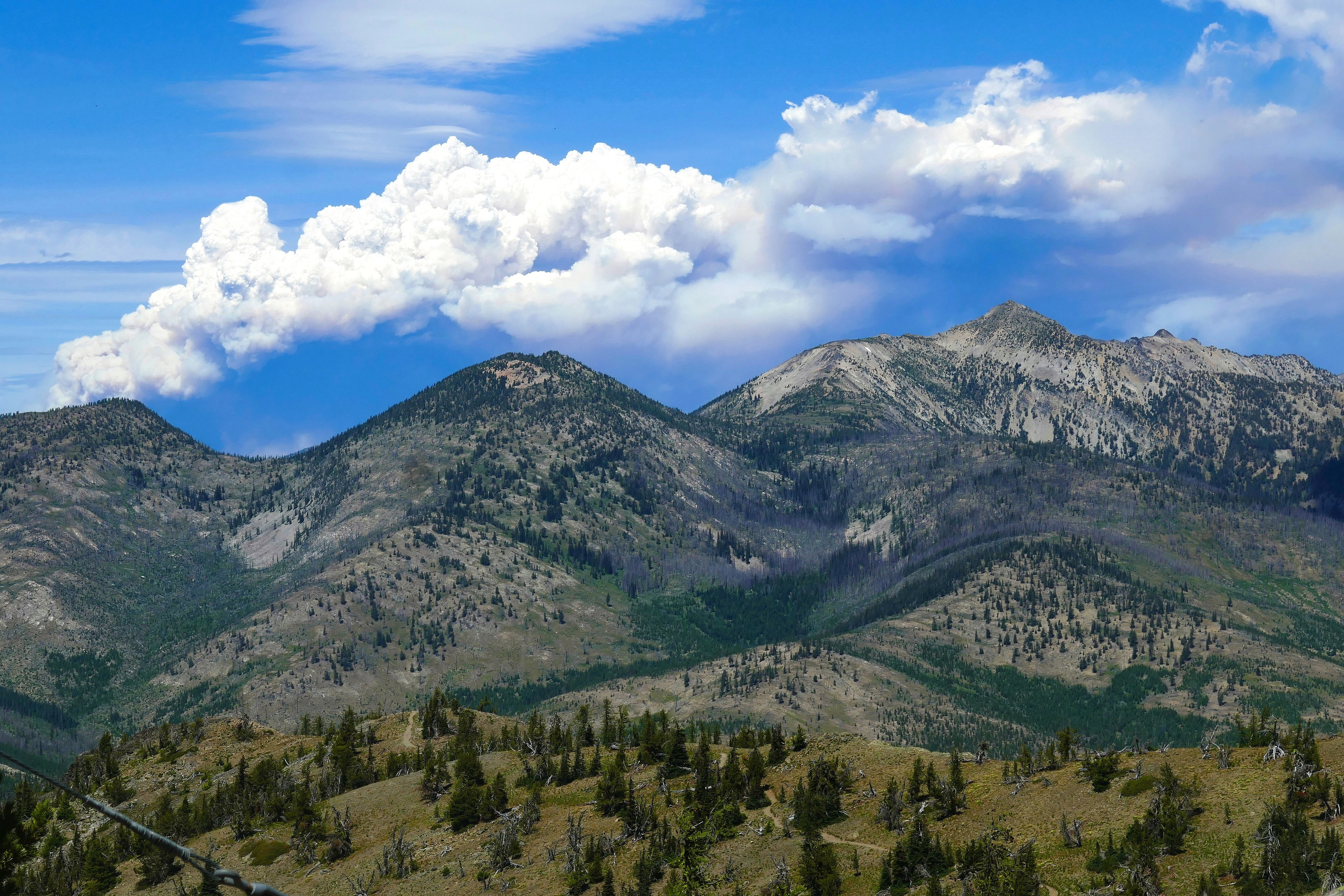
McLeod Mountain (right) with smoke from a wildfire in Canada in 2025

== Geology ==
The North Cascades features some of the most rugged topography in the Cascade Range with craggy peaks, spires, ridges, and deep glacial valleys. Geological events occurring many years ago created the diverse topography and drastic elevation changes over the Cascade Range leading to the various climate differences.

The history of the formation of the Cascade Mountains dates back millions of years ago to the late Eocene Epoch. With the North American Plate overriding the Pacific Plate, episodes of volcanic igneous activity persisted. In addition, small fragments of the oceanic and continental lithosphere called terranes created the North Cascades about 50 million years ago.

During the Pleistocene period dating back over two million years ago, glaciation advancing and retreating repeatedly scoured the landscape leaving deposits of rock debris. The U-shaped cross section of the river valleys is a result of recent glaciation. Uplift and faulting in combination with glaciation have been the dominant processes which have created the tall peaks and deep valleys of the North Cascades area.

== See also ==
- Geography of the North Cascades
- Geology of the Pacific Northwest
