= Mount Merriam =

Mountain in Alaska

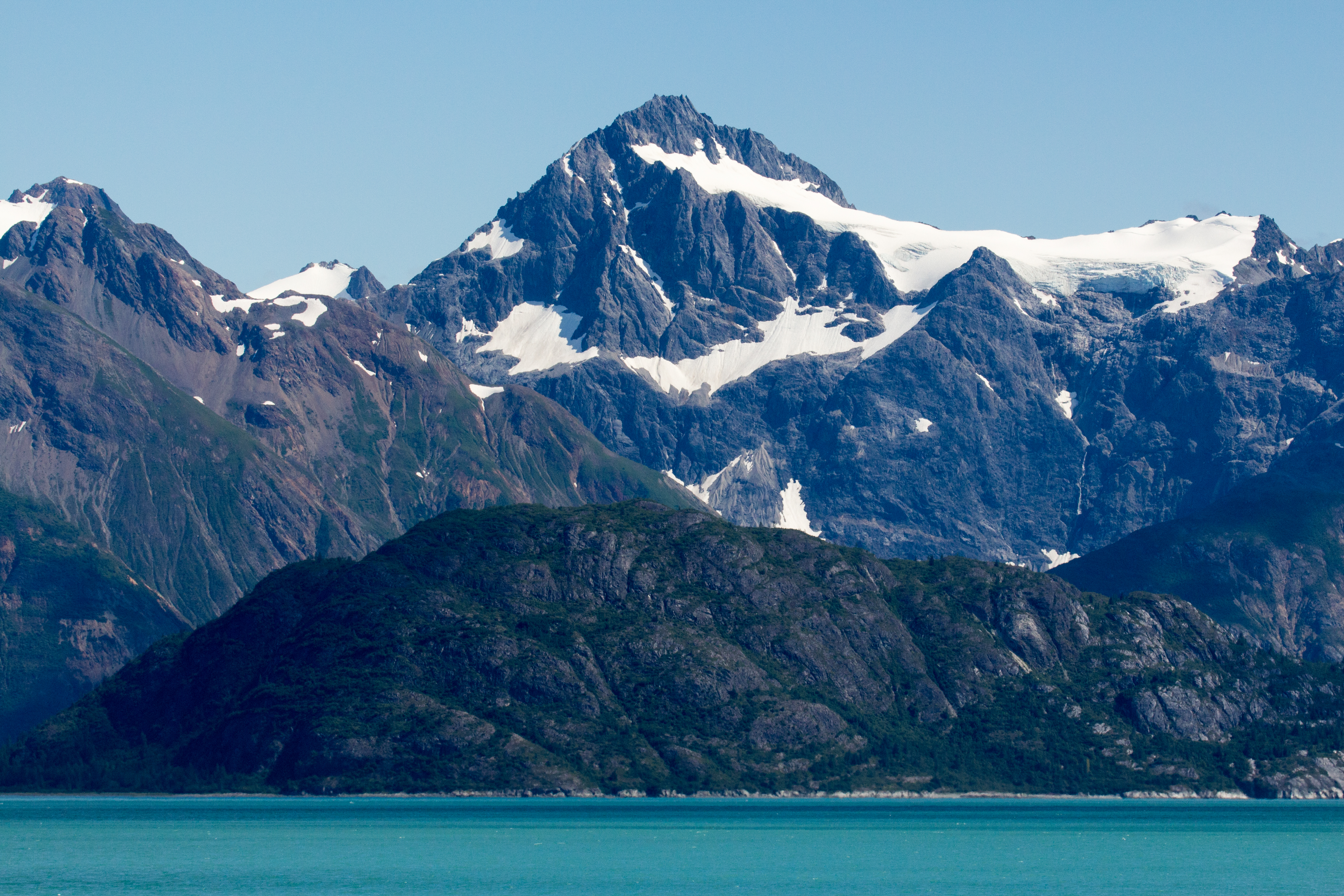
- Mount Merriam, west aspect

Highest point
- Elevation: 5,083 ft (1,549 m)
- Prominence: 4,383 ft (1,336 m)
- Parent peak: Mount Abdallah (6,210 ft)
- Isolation: 13.05 mi (21.00 km)
- Coordinates: 58°54′03″N 136°26′13″W

Geography
- Location within Alaska
- Interactive map of Mount Merriam
- Location: Glacier Bay National Park; Hoonah-Angoon; Alaska, United States
- Parent range: Takhinsha Mountains; Alsek Ranges; Saint Elias Mountains
- Topo map: USGS Mount Fairweather D-2

Climbing
- Easiest route: Scrambling South ridge

Mount Merriam is a prominent 5,083-foot (1,549-meter) mountain summit located in Glacier Bay National Park and Preserve, in the Alsek Ranges of the Saint Elias Mountains, in southeast Alaska. The mountain is situated 75 mi (121 km) northwest of Juneau, 3.1 mi (5 km) south of Mount Wordie, 3.5 mi (6 km) north of Black Cap Mountain, and 13.4 mi (22 km) southeast of Mount Abdallah which is the nearest higher peak. Although modest in elevation, relief is significant as the mountain rises up from tidewater in less than three miles, and it ranks 85th in prominence for all peaks in Alaska. The mountain was named by members of a 1941 Glacier Bay expedition for Dr. Clinton Hart Merriam (1855-1942), Chief of the U.S. Department of Agriculture (USDA) Biological Survey. Merriam was a zoologist for the 1899 Harriman Alaska expedition which explored Glacier Bay. Weather permitting, Mount Merriam can be seen from Glacier Bay, which is a popular destination for cruise ships. The months May through June offer the most favorable weather for viewing or climbing the peak.

== Climate ==
Based on the Köppen climate classification, Mount Merriam has a subarctic climate with cold, snowy winters, and mild summers. Weather systems coming off the Gulf of Alaska are forced upwards by the Saint Elias Mountains (orographic lift), causing heavy precipitation in the form of rainfall and snowfall. Winter temperatures can drop below −20 °C with wind chill factors below −30 °C. This climate supports several hanging glaciers on its slopes including the Twin Glacier just south of the summit. Precipitation runoff from the mountain and meltwater from the glaciers drains into Glacier Bay Basin.

== Gallery ==
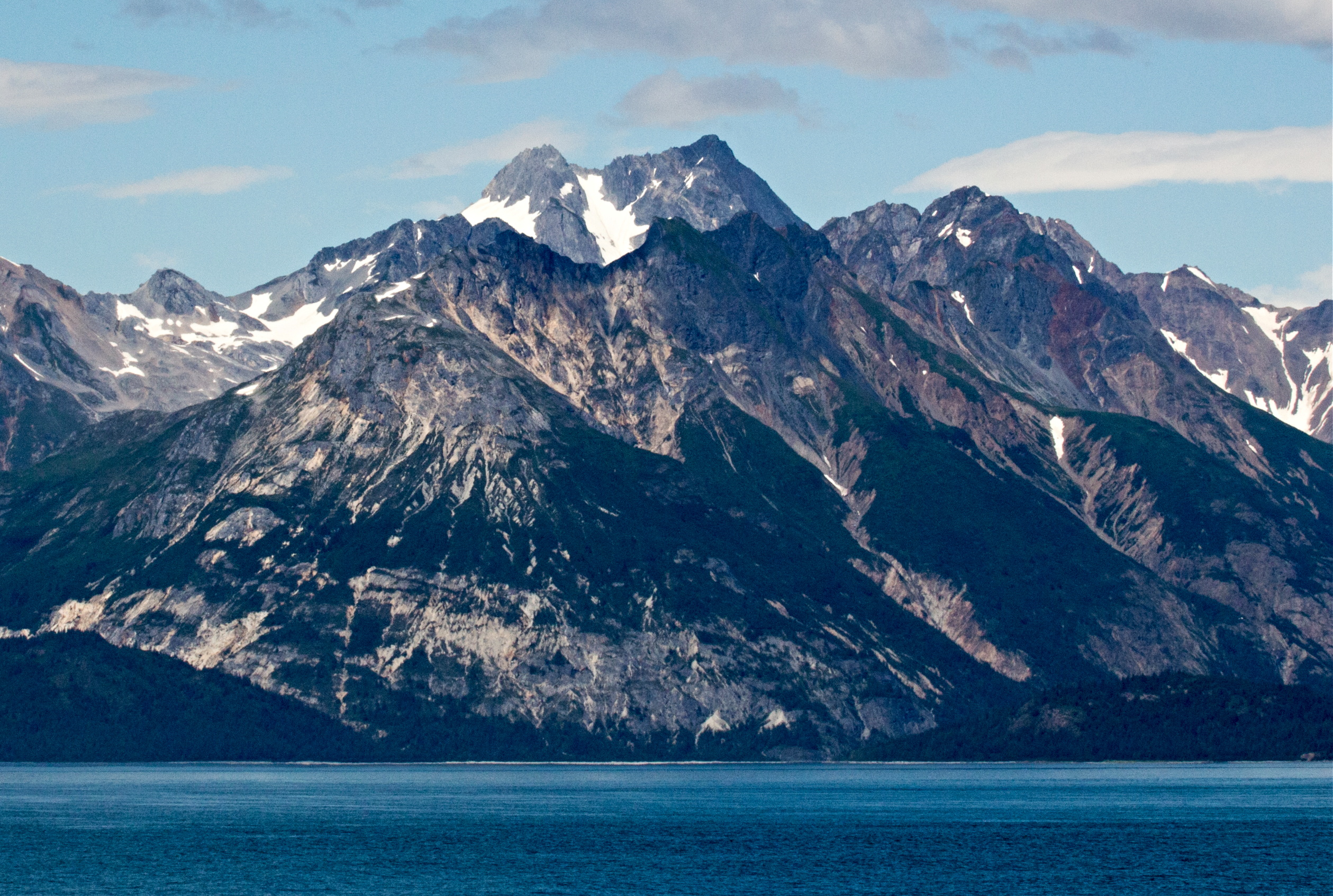
Mount Merriam looming behind Black Cap Mountain as seen from the south

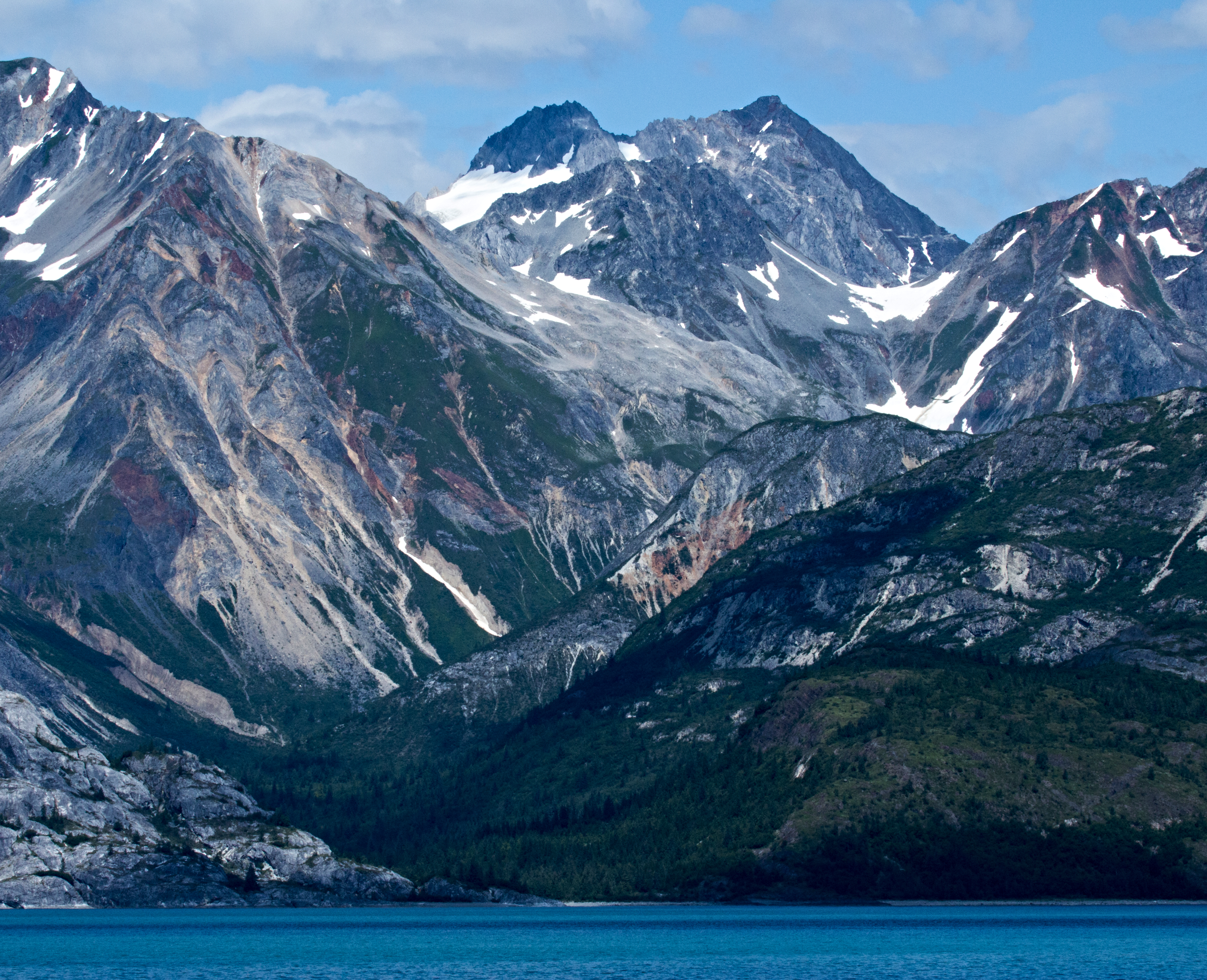
Mt. Merriam, south aspect

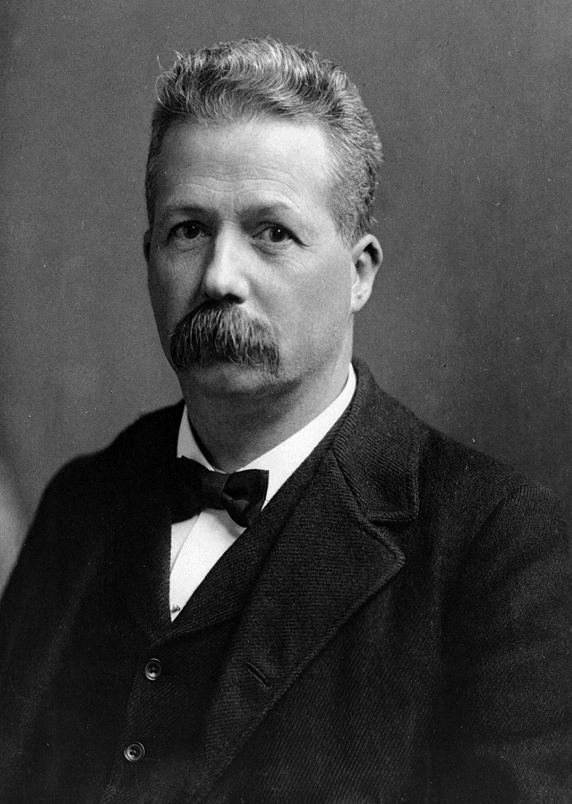
Dr. Clinton Hart Merriam

== See also ==
- List of mountain peaks of Alaska
- Geography of Alaska
