= Mount Barnard =

Mount Barnard may refer to:

- Mount Barnard (Alsek Ranges), a.k.a. Boundary Peak 160, a mountain on the Alaska-British Columbia border
- Mount Barnard (California), a mountain in California
- Mount Barnard (Canada), a mountain on the British Columbia-Alberta border/Continental Divide in the Canadian Rockies
