= North Cascade Heli Skiing =

Coordinates: 48°35′45″N 120°26′20″W

North Cascade Heli Skiing (based in Mazama, Washington), is a heliskiing operator permitted by the United States Forest Service to operate in a 300,000-acre area of the Okanogan and Wenatchee National Forests.
