= Merriam Peak =

Merriam Peak can refer to the following mountains in the United States:

- Merriam Peak (California), in Fresno County
- Merriam Peak (Idaho), in Custer County
- Merriam Peak (Nevada), in Nye County

== See also ==
- Mount Merriam, Alaska
