= McCloud =

McCloud may refer to:

== Places ==
- McCloud, California, a small town
- McCloud High School, in the above town
- McCloud River, California

== Fictional characters ==
- Fox McCloud, the main character in the Star Fox series
  - James McCloud, Fox's father
- The title character of Brewster McCloud, a 1970 film by Robert Altman
- Sam McCloud, main character of McCloud, an American television police drama that aired from 1970 to 1977
- Louise "Lou" McCloud, from the television series The Young Riders
- Ace McCloud, one of the main character from the television series The Centurions
- Fin McCloud, on the Teletoon Canadian animated sitcom Stoked
- Scott McCloud, the main character of the Space Angel cartoon series

== Other uses ==
- McCloud (surname), an English-language surname
- McCloud (TV series), an American television police drama that aired from 1970 to 1977
- McCloud Railway, a former railway which operated near Mount Shasta, California, from 1992 to 2009

== Similar names ==
- MacLeod (disambiguation)
- McLoud (disambiguation)
