= Black Cap Mountain (Alaska) =

Mountain in Alaska

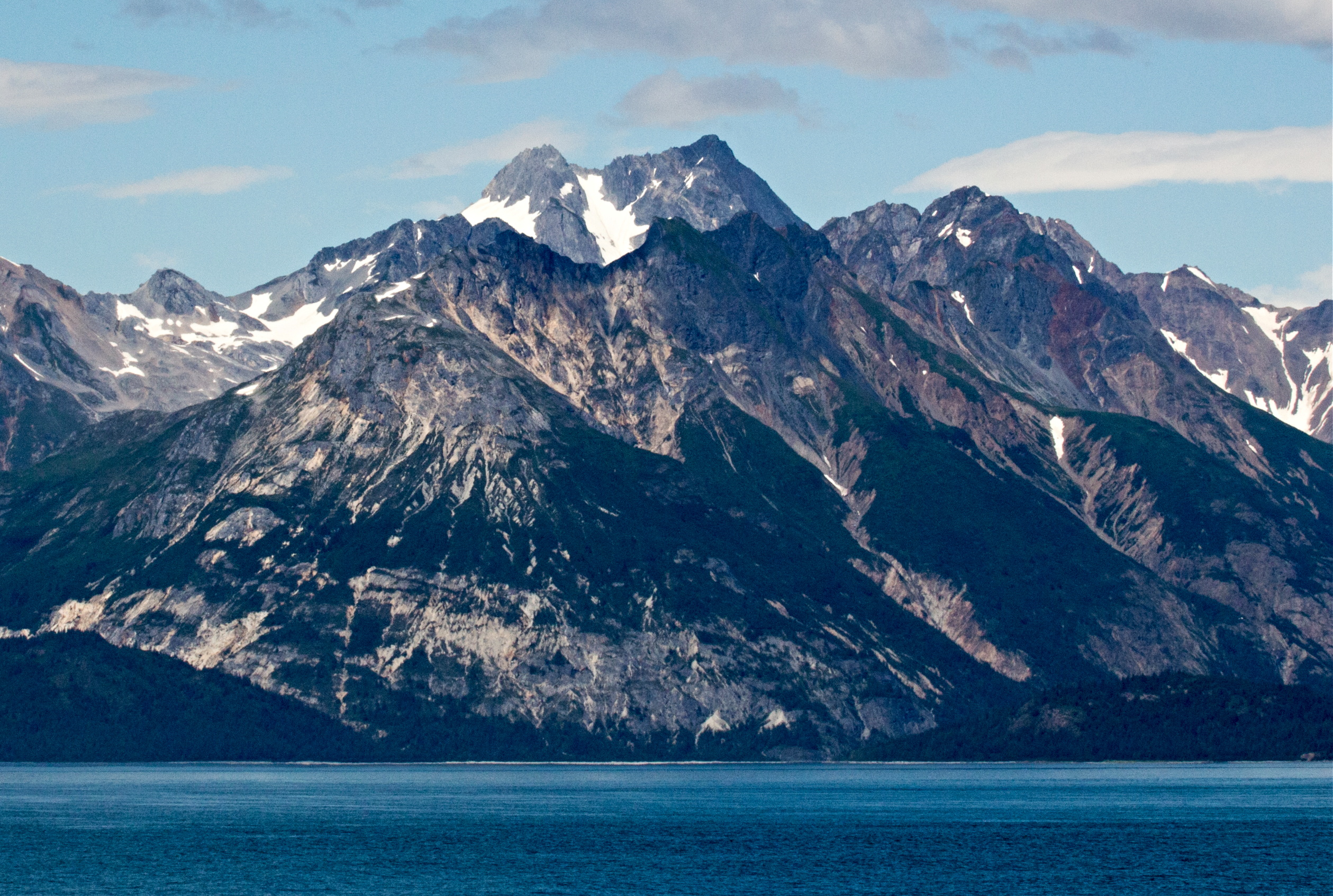
- Black Cap Mountain directly in front of Mount Merrian, the highest peak

Highest point
- Elevation: 3,321 ft (1,012 m)
- Prominence: 285 ft (87 m)
- Parent peak: Mount Merriam (5,083 ft)
- Isolation: 1.13 mi (1.82 km)
- Coordinates: 58°51′05″N 136°24′53″W

Geography
- Location within Alaska
- Location: Glacier Bay National Park; Hoonah-Angoon; Alaska, United States
- Parent range: Takhinsha Mountains; Alsek Ranges; Saint Elias Mountains
- Topo map: USGS Mount Fairweather D-2

Geology
- Rock age: Silurian
- Rock type: limestone

Climbing
- Easiest route: Scrambling South ridge

Black Cap Mountain is a 3,321-foot (1,012-meter) mountain summit located in Glacier Bay National Park and Preserve, in the Alsek Ranges of the Saint Elias Mountains, in southeast Alaska. The mountain is situated immediately north of the entrance to Tidal Inlet, 80 mi (129 km) northwest of Juneau, and 3.5 mi (6 km) south of Mount Merriam, which is the nearest higher peak. Although modest in elevation, relief is significant as the mountain rises up from tidewater in less than two miles. The mountain's descriptive name was given by the U.S. Geological Survey in 1956 because the summit is composed of black limestone which contrasts with the color of the flanks of the mountain, making it visible for many miles. The mountain's name was officially adopted in 1960 by the U.S. Board on Geographic Names. Weather permitting, Black Cap Mountain can be seen from Glacier Bay, which is a popular destination for cruise ships. The months May through June offer the most favorable weather for viewing or climbing the peak.

== Climate ==
Based on the Köppen climate classification, Black Cap Mountain has a subarctic climate with cold, snowy winters, and cool summers. Weather systems coming off the Gulf of Alaska are forced upwards by the Saint Elias Mountains (orographic lift), causing heavy precipitation in the form of rainfall and snowfall. Temperatures can drop below −20 °C with wind chill factors below −30 °C. Precipitation runoff from the mountain drains into Glacier Bay Basin.

== See also ==
- List of mountain peaks of Alaska
- Geography of Alaska
