= McLeod =

McLeod may refer to:

- McLeod (surname)
- Clan MacLeod, a Highland Scottish clan associated with the Isle of Skye

== Places ==
=== Canada ===
- McLeod (Edmonton), a residential neighbourhood in Edmonton, Canada
- Rural Municipality of McLeod No. 185, Saskatchewan
- McLeod River, a river in west-central Alberta, Canada

=== United States ===
- McLeod County, Minnesota
- McLeod, Texas, an unincorporated community
- McLeod, an unincorporated community in Sweet Grass County, Montana
- McLeod Mountain, a mountain in Washington state
- McLeod, North Dakota
- McLeod Plantation, located on James Island, South Carolina
- McLeod Creek, a tributary of East Canyon Creek in Summit County, Utah

=== India ===
- McLeod Ganj, town in Himachal Pradesh, India

== Medicine ==
- McLeod Health, an hospital network serving the twelve counties of northeastern South Carolina
- McLeod syndrome, an X-linked recessive genetic disorder

== Tools ==
- McLeod (tool), a two-sided blade used for wildfire suppression and trail conservation
- McLeod gauge, a scientific instrument used to measure very low pressures

== Television ==
- McLeod's Daughters, an Australian television drama program

== See also ==
- MacLeod (disambiguation)
