= MacLeod (disambiguation) =

MacLeod most often refers to the surnames MacLeod, Macleod, McLeod, and Mcleod.

MacLeod and Macleod may also refer to:

== Places ==
- Macleod, Victoria, suburb of Melbourne, Australia
  - Macleod railway station
- Macleod Trail (Calgary) a Major arterial road in Calgary, Alberta
- Fort Macleod, Alberta, town in Alberta, Canada

=== Electoral districts ===
- Macleod (federal electoral district), a federal electoral district in Alberta
- Macleod (provincial electoral district), a former provincial electoral district in Alberta
- Macleod (territorial electoral district), a former territorial electoral district in the Northwest Territories
- Livingstone-Macleod, a current provincial electoral district in Alberta
- Pincher Creek-Macleod, a former provincial electoral district in Alberta

== Other ==
- 73rd (Perthshire) Regiment of Foot, a Highland Infantry unit of the British Army, also known as MacLeod's Highlanders
- Clan MacLeod, Scottish clan
- Clan MacLeod of Lewis, Scottish clan
- Lake Macleod, lake in Western Australia
- McLeod Lake, British Columbia, formerly Fort McLeod; named for Archibald McLeod
- Macleod Peak, mountain in British Columbia

== See also ==
- McLeod (disambiguation)
- MacLeòid
- McLoud (disambiguation)
- McCloud (disambiguation)
