= McLoud =

McLoud may refer to:

- McLoud, Oklahoma, a town in Pottawatomie County, Oklahoma, United States of America
- McLoud High School, a high-school in Pottawatomie County, Oklahoma, United States of America
- John William McLoud, attorney and namesake of McLoud, Oklahoma
- Alex McLoud, character on the TV series Secret Diary of a Call Girl

== See also ==
- MacLeod (disambiguation)
- McCloud (disambiguation)
- MacLeòid
- Jennifer McLoud-Mann, Native American mathematician
- Smith McLoud House, a historic home located at Middlesex in Yates County, New York
