= Mount Barnard (Alsek Ranges) =

Mountain in Alaska and British Columbia

- Boundary Peak 160
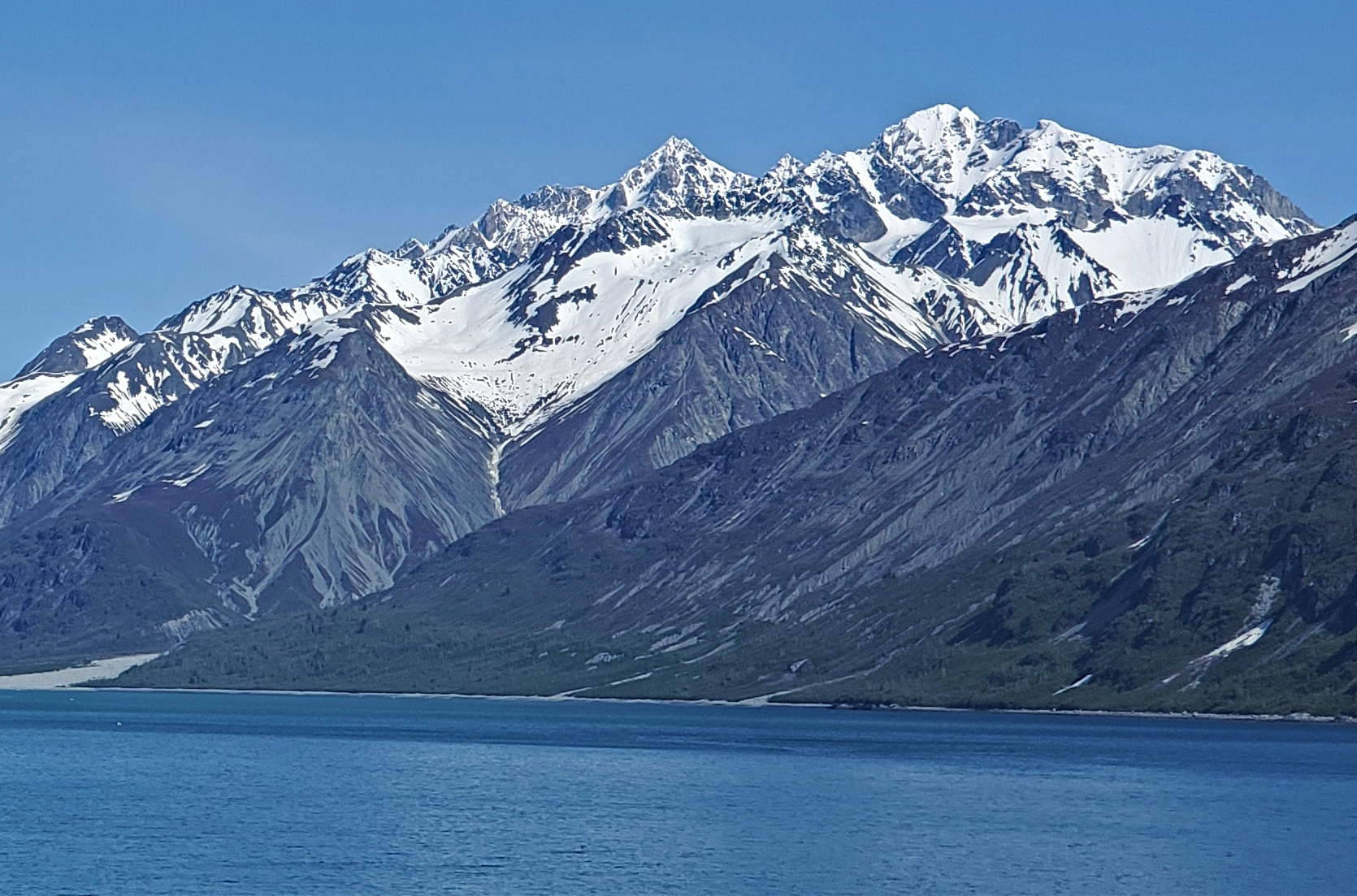
- Summit centered behind

Highest point
- Elevation: 8,173 ft (2,491 m)
- Prominence: 3,678 ft (1,121 m)
- Listing: Mountains of British Columbia; Mountains of Alaska
- Coordinates: 59°06′07″N 136°58′12″W

Geography
- Location within Alaska Location within British Columbia
- Countries: Canada; United States
- Province: British Columbia
- State: Alaska
- Parent range: Alsek Ranges
- Topo map: NTS 114P2 Carroll Glacier

Mount Barnard, also named Boundary Peak 160, is a mountain in Alaska and British Columbia, located on the Canada–United States border, and part of the Alsek Ranges of the Saint Elias Mountains. In 1923 Boundary Peak 160 was named Mount Barnard in honour of Edward Chester Barnard, a U.S. Boundary Commissioner from 1915 to 1921 and chief topographer of the United States and Canada Boundary Survey from 1903 to 1915. The first ascent of Mount Barnard was made on August 24, 1966, from the head of Tarr Inlet by D. Kenyon King, Peter H. Robinson and David P. Johnston. The details on file with Peak Service at Bartlett Cove, Glacier Bay National Monument, Gustavus, Alaska.

== Gallery ==
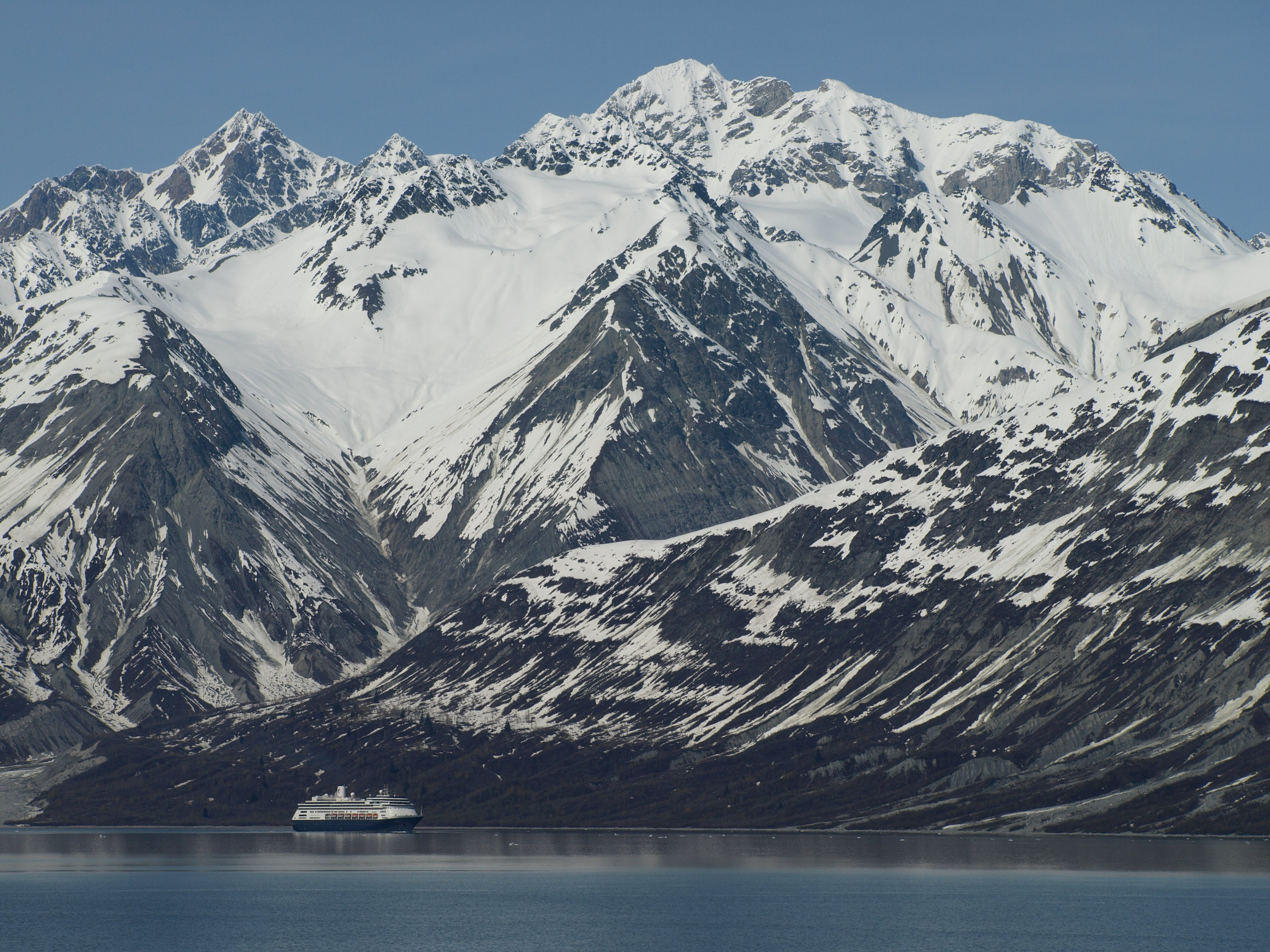

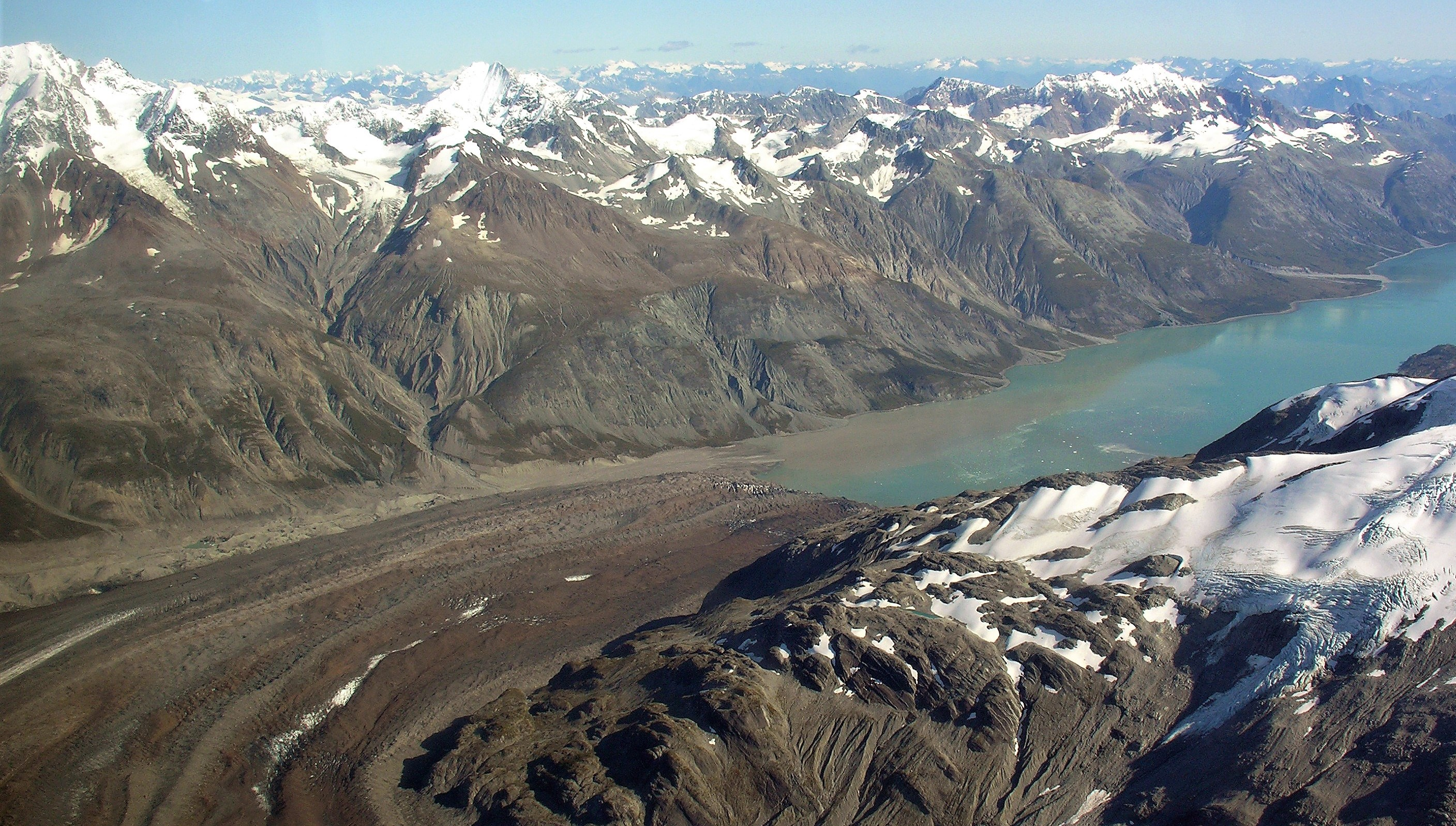
Mt. Barnard upper left corner, with Tarr Inlet

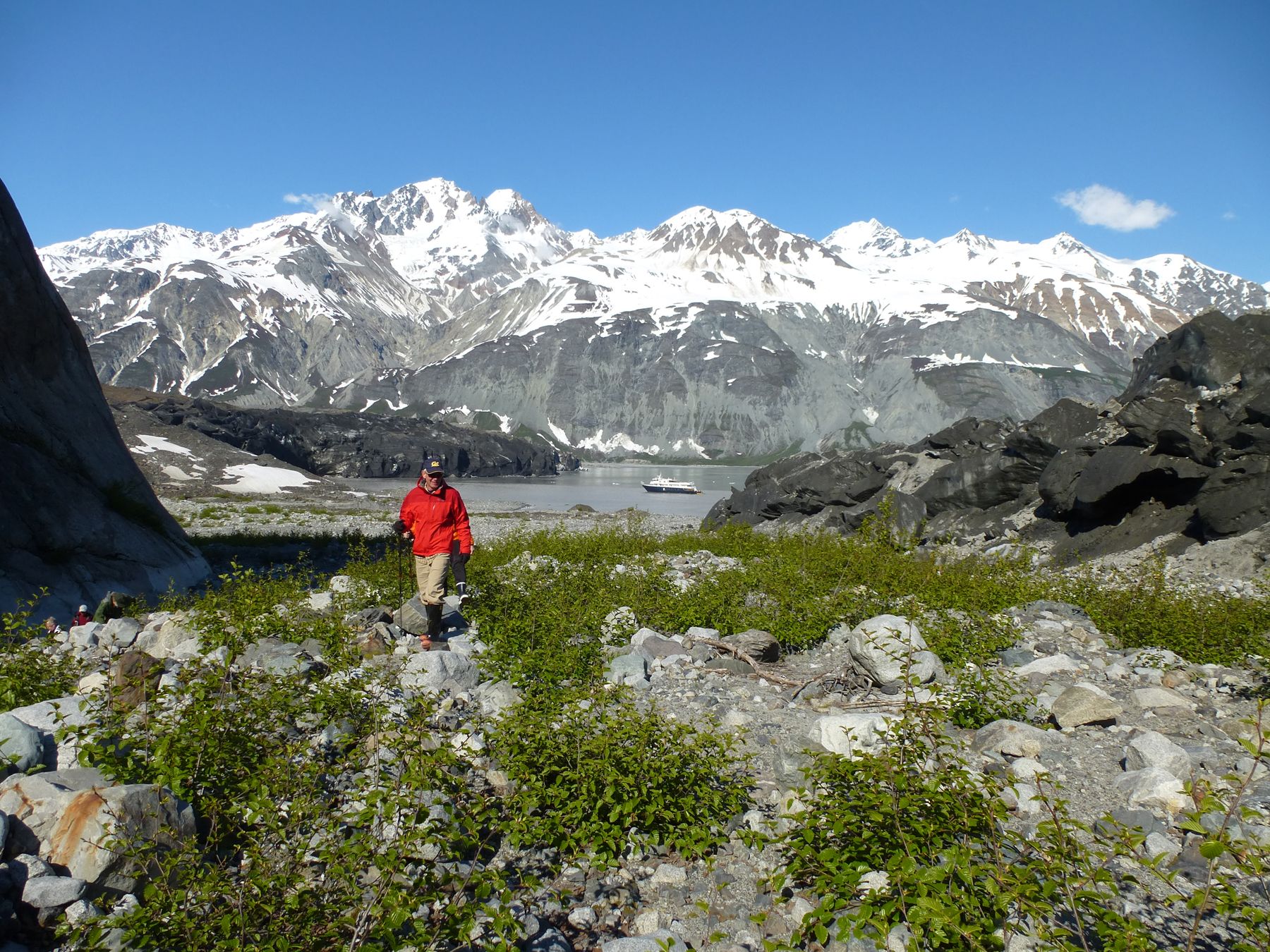
Mt. Barnard upper left, from southwest

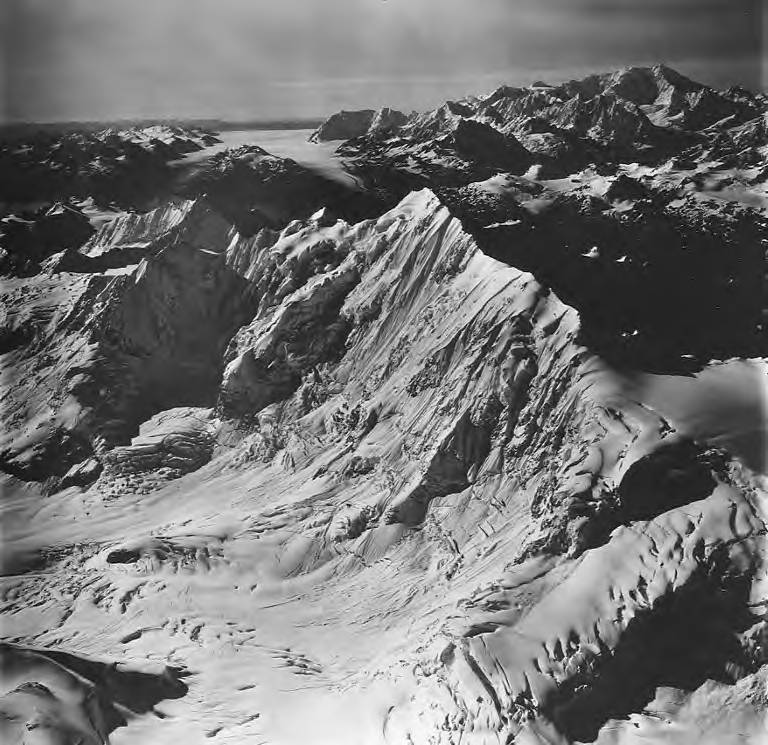
Aerial view, camera pointed south

== See also ==
- List of Boundary Peaks of the Alaska–British Columbia/Yukon border
