= Edward Chester Barnard =

American topographer

Edward Chester Barnard (November 13, 1863–1921) was an American topographer. Born in New York City, he was a graduate of Columbia University (1884). He was the chief topographer of the United States and Canada boundary survey (1903–1915); U.S. Boundary Commissioner (1915–1921); and topographer with the United States Geological Survey (1884–1907). Mount Barnard in Glacier Bay National Park and Preserve was posthumously named in his honor by the International Boundary Commission.
