= Mount Abdallah =

Mountain in Alaska

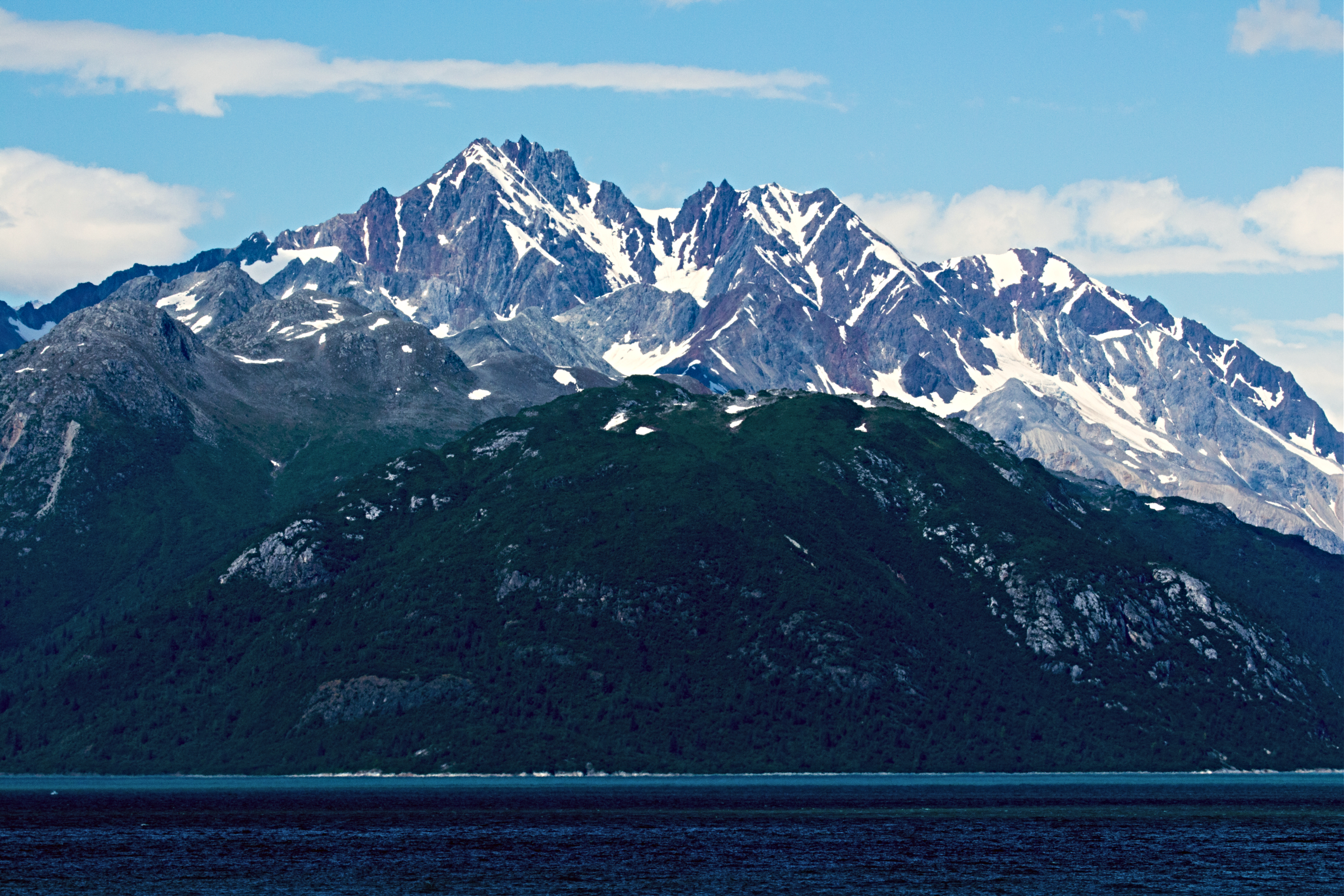
- Mount Abdallah

Highest point
- Elevation: 6,210 ft (1,890 m)
- Prominence: 2,210 ft (670 m)
- Parent peak: Mount Barnard (8173 ft)
- Coordinates: 58°59′21″N 136°46′14″W

Geography
- Location within Alaska
- Interactive map of Mount Abdallah
- Location: Glacier Bay National Park and Preserve; Hoonah-Angoon; Alaska, United States
- Parent range: Alsek Ranges; Saint Elias Mountains
- Topo map: USGS Mount Fairweather D-3

Climbing
- Easiest route: Scrambling Northeast ridge

Mount Abdallah is a prominent 6,210-foot (1,893-meter) mountain summit located in the Alsek Ranges of the Saint Elias Mountains, in southeast Alaska. The mountain is situated in Glacier Bay National Park and Preserve, as the highest point between Tarr Inlet and Rendu Inlet, 93 mi (150 km) northwest of Juneau, and 10.5 mi (17 km) southeast of Mount Barnard, which is the nearest higher peak. Although modest in elevation, relief is significant since the mountain rises up from tidewater in less than three miles. The mountain was named in 1892 by Harry Fielding Reid, an American geophysicist, who in 1892 hired a small crew of men for an expedition to study glaciology in Glacier Bay. There is no record of who Reid named this mountain for, but a member of his expeditionary crew who accompanied him might be a possibility. The months May through June offer the most favorable weather for viewing Mount Abdallah. Weather permitting, Mount Abdallah can be seen from Glacier Bay, which is a popular destination for cruise ships.

== Climate ==
Based on the Köppen climate classification, Mount Abdallah has a subarctic climate with cold, snowy winters, and mild summers. Temperatures can drop below −20 °C with wind chill factors below −30 °C. This climate supports the Romer Glacier on the east slopes, and an unnamed glacier on the north flank. Precipitation runoff and meltwater from its glaciers drains into Glacier Bay Basin.

== Gallery ==
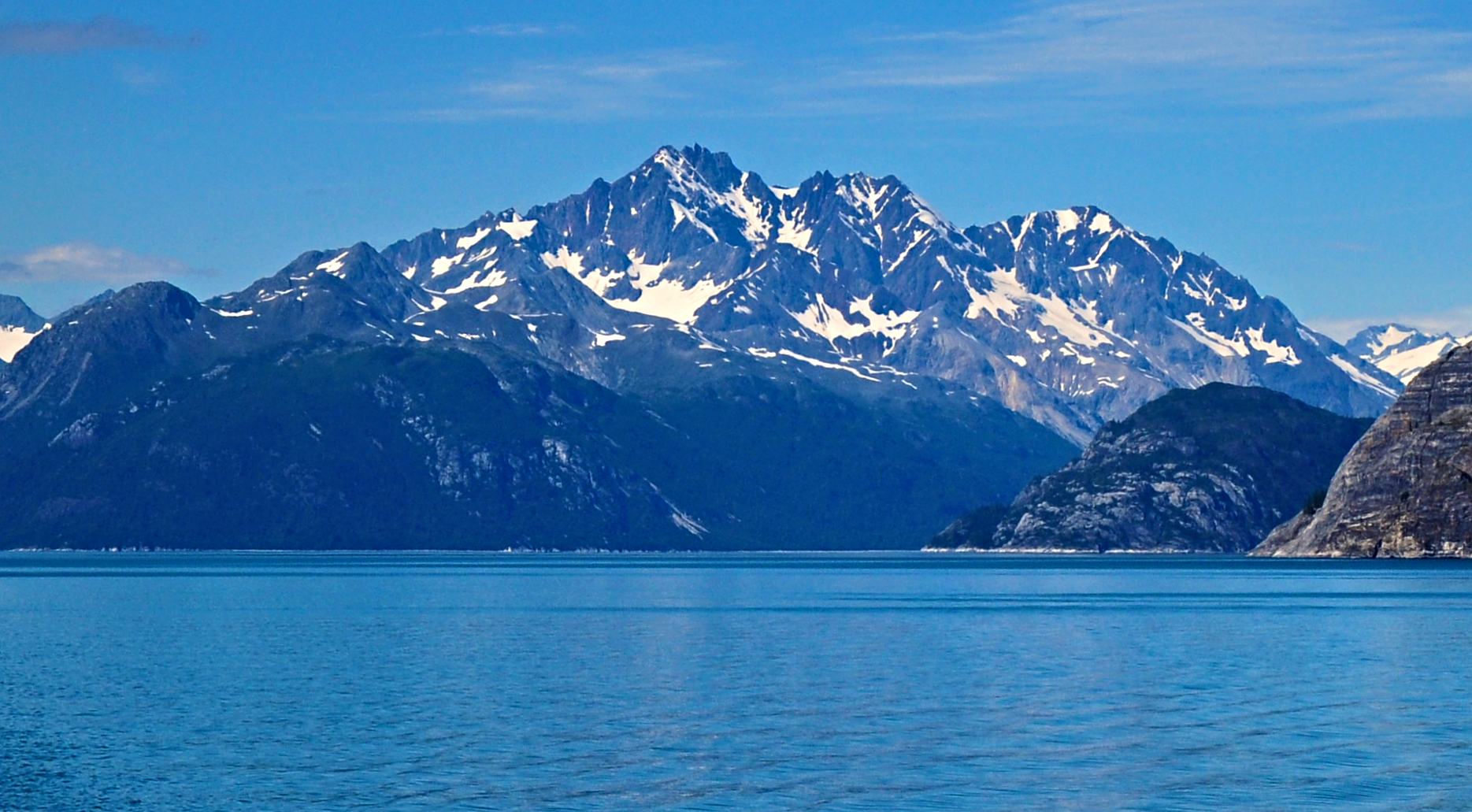
Mount Abdallah

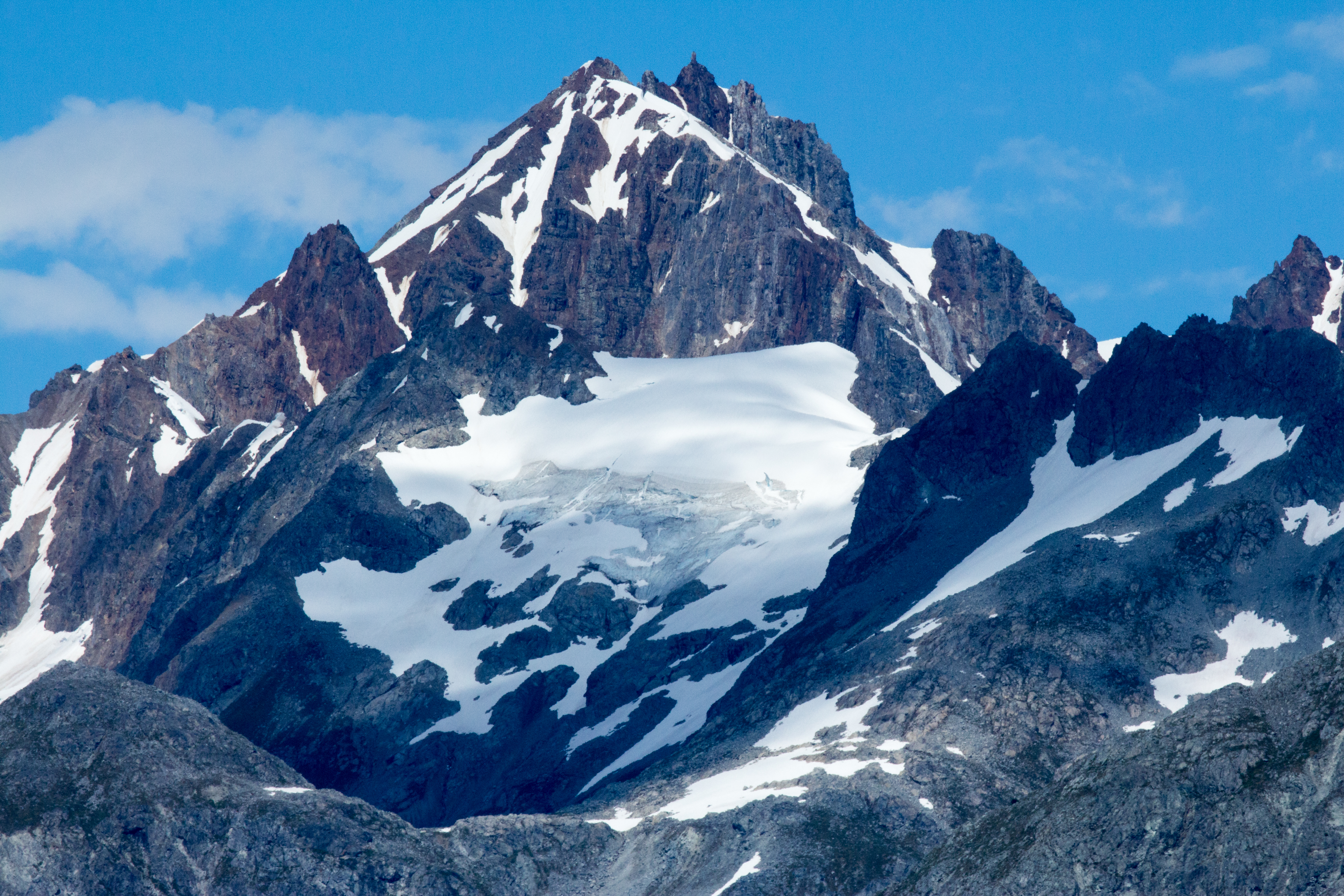
Summit detail

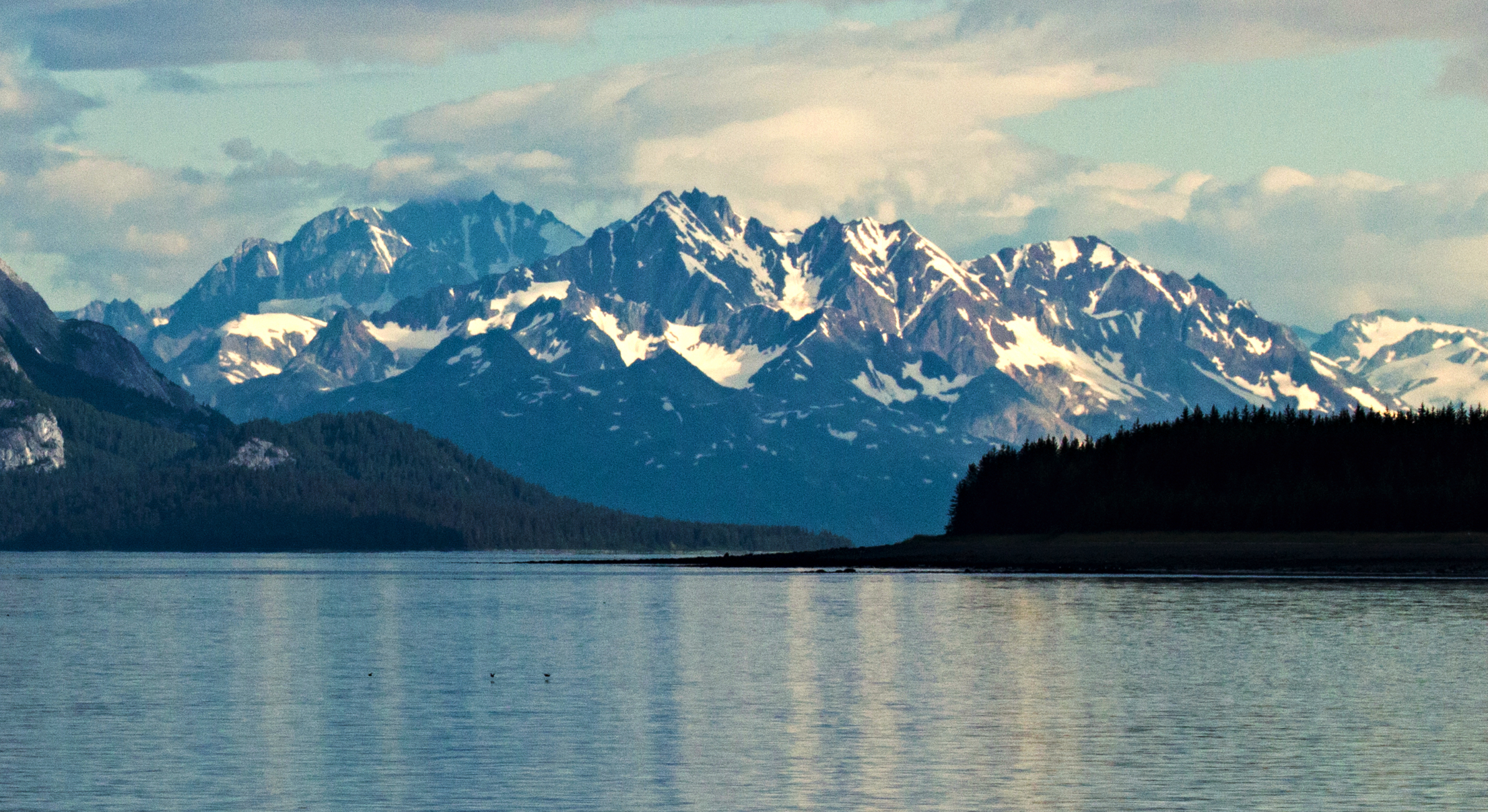
Mt. Abdallah

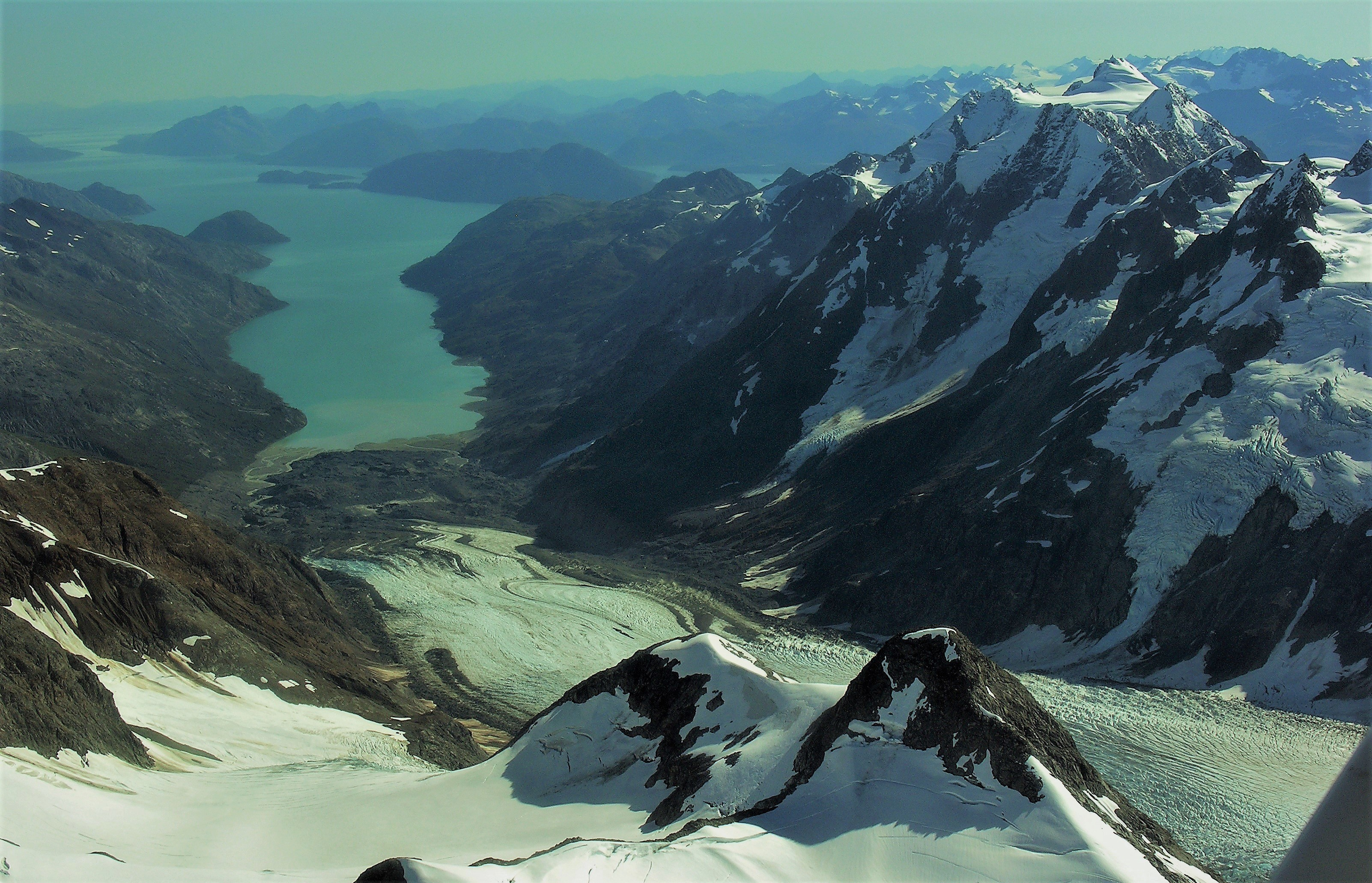
Aerial view of Mount Abdallah (right), Rendu Inlet, and Rendu Glacier

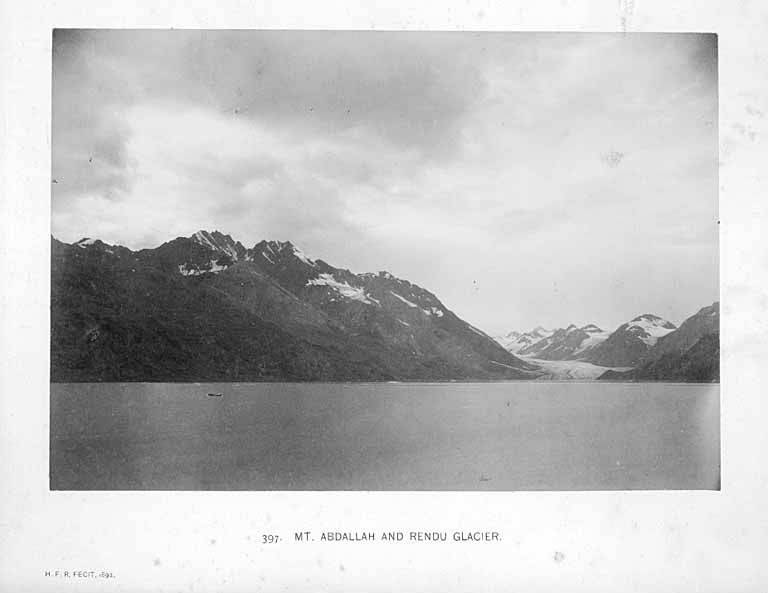
Mount Abdallah, by Harry Fielding Reid, 1892

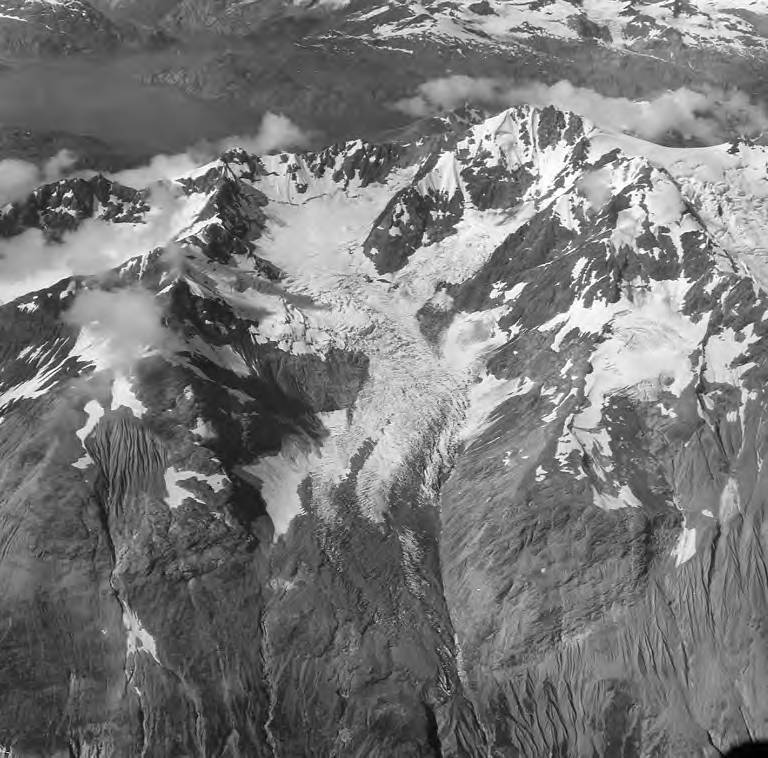
1961 aerial view of Mount Abdallah featuring Romer Glacier

== See also ==
- List of mountain peaks of Alaska
- Geography of Alaska
