= Goat Peak =

Mountain in Washington (state), United States

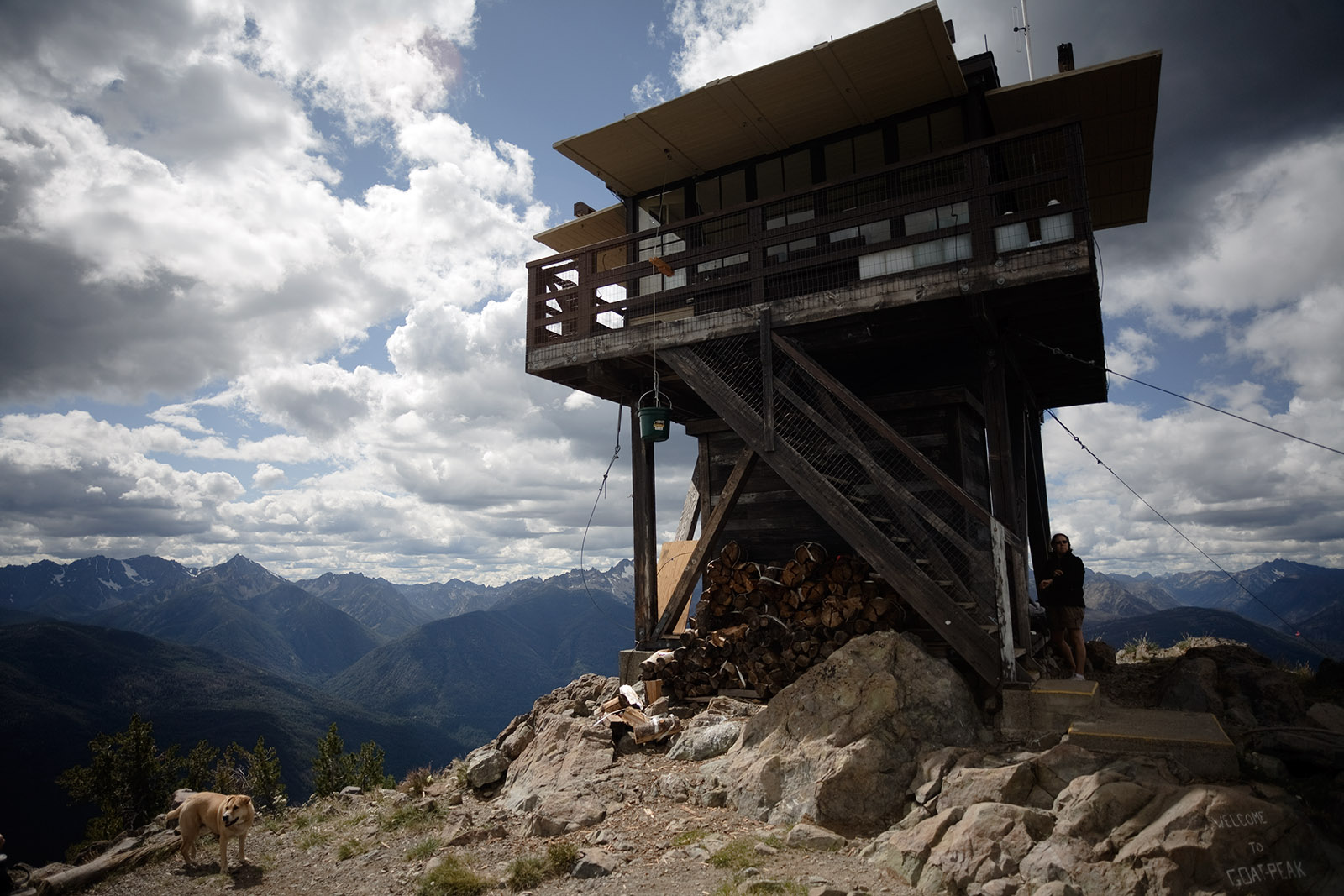
- Goat Peak lookout tower

Highest point
- Elevation: 7,001 ft (2,134 m)
- Coordinates: 48°37′56″N 120°24′14″W

Geography
- Location: Okanogan County, Washington, U.S.
- Parent range: North Cascades
- Topo map: USGS Big Snow Mountain

Goat Peak is a 7,001-foot (2,134 m) peak in the North Cascades of Washington, United States. The summit offers broad views of the Methow River valley, as well as many of the other prominent cascade peaks including glaciated Silver Star Mountain. A working US Forest Service fire lookout is located on the summit. The trailhead for Goat Peak is accessible from Forest Road 52, 1 mile (1.6 km) southeast of Mazama, starting at an elevation of 5,600 feet (1,700 m).

This Goat Peak is one of three summits with the same name in Washington state.
