= McCloud (surname) =

- Language: English

Origin
- Languages: 1. Scottish Gaelic; 2. Irish
- Origin: 1. MacLeòid; 2. Mac Leóid

McCloud is a Scottish or Irish surname, most likely a variant of MacLeod. Notable people with the surname include:

- Coyote McCloud (1942–2011), disc jockey in Nashville, Tennessee
- David J. McCloud (1945–1998), Lieutenant General in the United States Air Force
- Demelza McCloud (born 1980), Australian netball player
- George McCloud (born 1967), American former professional basketball player
- Jordan McCloud (born 1999), American football player
- Kevin McCloud (born 1959), British television presenter
- Nick McCloud (born 1998), American football player
- Nicole McCloud (born 1958), American singer, also known by her mononym Nicole. Also known as Lillie McCloud, as a contestant in season 3 of the American singing competition The X Factor
- Ray-Ray McCloud (born 1996), American football player
- Ross McCloud (1819–1868), early settler of northern California
- Scott McCloud (born 1960), American cartoonist
- TJ McCloud (born 1980), American folk musician
- Tyrus McCloud (born 1974), American football player
- Victoria McCloud (born 1969), British lawyer and former judge
- Zach McCloud (born 1998), American football player

== Fictional characters ==
- Fox McCloud, protagonist of Nintendo's Star Fox series.
- Ace McCloud, member of the Centurions

== See also ==
- MacLeod
