= MacLeòid =

Family name

- Gender: Masculine
- Language: Scottish Gaelic

Other gender
- Feminine: NicLeòid

Origin
- Language: Scottish Gaelic
- Derivation: mac + Leòid
- Meaning: "son" or "daughter" "of Leòd".

MacLeòid or MhicLeòid (in the genitive case) is a masculine surname in Scottish Gaelic. The name translates into English as "son of Leòd", and the feminine form is NicLeòid: a contraction of "Nighean-Mhic-Leòid", meaning "daughter of the son of Leòd." These surnames originated as patronymic names; however, they no longer refer to the actual name of the bearer's father or grandfather. There are numerous Anglicised forms of MacLeòid.

== Etymology ==
The Scottish Gaelic MacLeòid originated as a patronym, in the form of mac Leòid, which translates into English as "son of Leòd". Today, however, the surname MacLeòid does not refer to the actual name of the bearer's father. The name Leòd is a Scottish Gaelic derivative of the Old Norse personal name Ljótr. This Old Norse personal name is composed of an element which translates into English as "ugly".

== Feminine form ==
MacLeòid is a masculine surname. The Scottish Gaelic form of this surname for females is NicLeòid. This feminine name is composed of the prefix Nic- which is an abbreviated form of the Scottish Gaelic nighean-mhic which translates into English as "daughter of the son." Like the masculine form of the surname, NicLeòid no longer refers to the actual name of the bearer's father.

== Anglicised forms ==
Anglicised forms of MacLeòid, in use today, include MacLeod, McCloud, McLeod, McLoud. Anglicised forms of Mac Leóid include MacLeod, MacCleod, and MacCloud. According to late 19th-century Irish genealogist John O'Hart, the English MacLeod is also an Anglicised form of the Irish Mac Giolla Mochadha, which is etymologically unrelated to MacLeòid and Mac Leóid.

== Families ==
An early record of the surname is of Gillandres MacLeod, in 1227. Gillandres was likely a member of a noted clerical family that descended from Leod, a 12th-century 'abbot' of Brechin. The surname MacLeòid, and its various Anglicised forms, have also been borne by members of Clan MacLeod, a once powerful Scottish clan, seated on the west coast of Scotland. The leading branches of the clan are the MacLeods of MacLeod. who are seated on Skye; and the MacLeods of Lewis, who were historically seated on Lewis. (Note: The original line of the MacLeods of Lewis was extinguished and lost in the early 17th century, and a new line was recognised by the Lord Lyon in the late 20th century. Since the late 20th century, the MacLeods of MacLeods have not been male-line descendants of the original line of chiefs.) The MacLeods of Clan MacLeod derive their surname from Leod, a shadowy figure who does not appear in contemporary records, but is thought to have lived in the 13th century. The first members of the family to appear in contemporary records are Malcolm MacLeod and Torquil MacLeod, who are recorded in a royal charter in about the year 1343.
