= Mazama, Washington =

Unincorporated community in Washington, US

- Unincorporated community
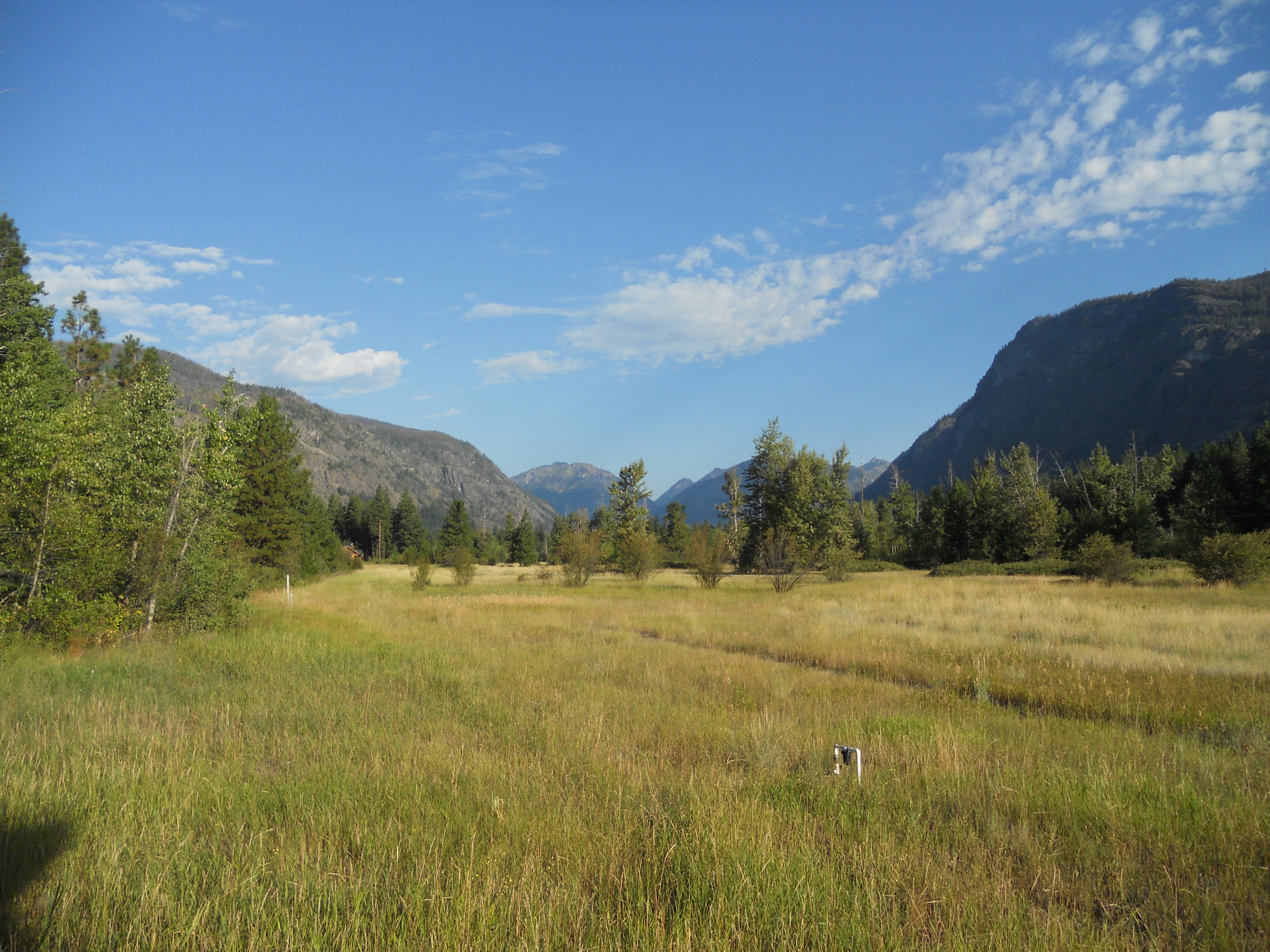
- A small meadow in Mazama

- Location within Washington (state)
- Coordinates: 48°35′32″N 120°24′14″W
- Country: United States
- State: Washington
- County: Okanogan
- Elevation: 2,106 ft (642 m)
- Time zone: UTC-8 (Pacific (PST))
  - Summer (DST): UTC-7 (PDT)
- ZIP code: 98833
- Area code: 509
- GNIS feature ID: 1522828

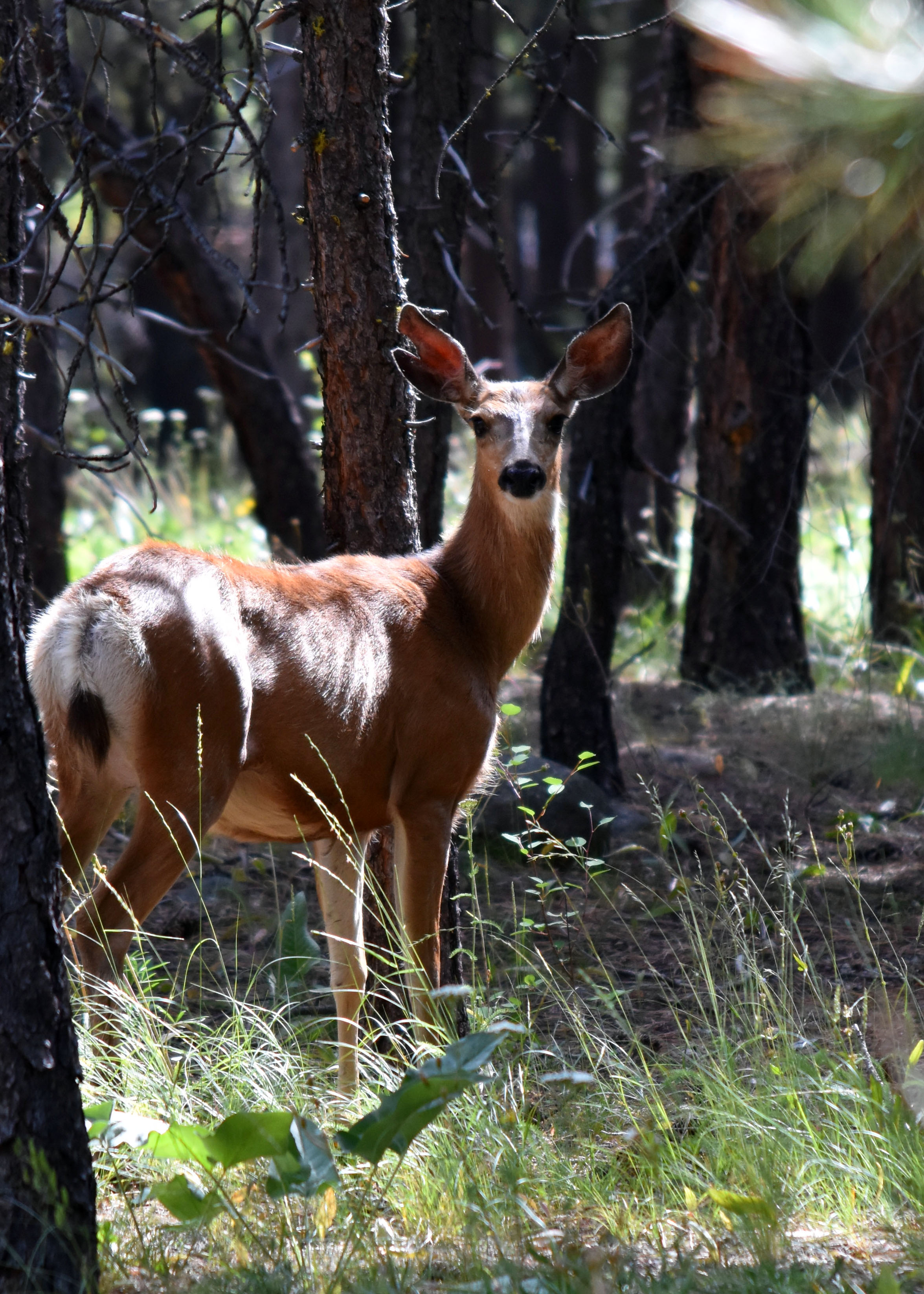
Deer in Mazama on the last stretch of the Spokane Gulch Trail heading towards the Mazama Store

Mazama (/məˈzæmə/ mə-ZAM-ə) is an unincorporated community in Okanogan County (population 158) located in the Methow Valley of Washington, on the east slopes of the North Cascades and North Cascades National Park. It is located along the North Cascades Highway (Highway 20), 14 miles (23 km) northwest of Winthrop and about 28 miles (45 km) south of the Canada–United States border. Mazama's town center elevation is 2,106 feet (642 m), and it is located 2.7 miles (4.3 km) south of and 4,895 feet (1,492 m) below Goat Peak.

Founded around the beginning of the twentieth century, Mazama boomed as the departure point for mining towns in the rugged Harts Pass area, such as Barron, Chancellor, and Robinson. The settlement is centered at the intersection of Lost River Road and Country Road 9140. It has a general store, an adventure supply store, a gas station, a café, and two restaurants. The area is a destination for outdoor recreation, including rock climbing, mountaineering, snowmobiling, and backcountry skiing. It is home to one of the world's longest cross-country skiing trails, stretching for 120 miles (190 km) and running through the settlement.

== Etymology ==
In the 19th century, the town was called "Goat Creek", after a creek at the base of nearby Goat Peak (then called Goat Mountain). When the former post office was secured in 1899, the settlers chose a name they thought was Greek for "mountain goat". They later discovered that they had looked in the wrong dictionary and, according to Edmond S. Meany, the meaning of "Mazama" was not "mountain goat" in Greek.

According to toponymist William Bright the name "Mazama" originally came from the Nahuatl word mazame, "deer (plural)", from mazatl, "a deer", referring to brocket deer. In the past the word was used locally to refer to mountain goats or bighorn mountain sheep. In 1896 the word was used in the naming of the Portland mountaineering club, The Mazamas.

== Ecology ==
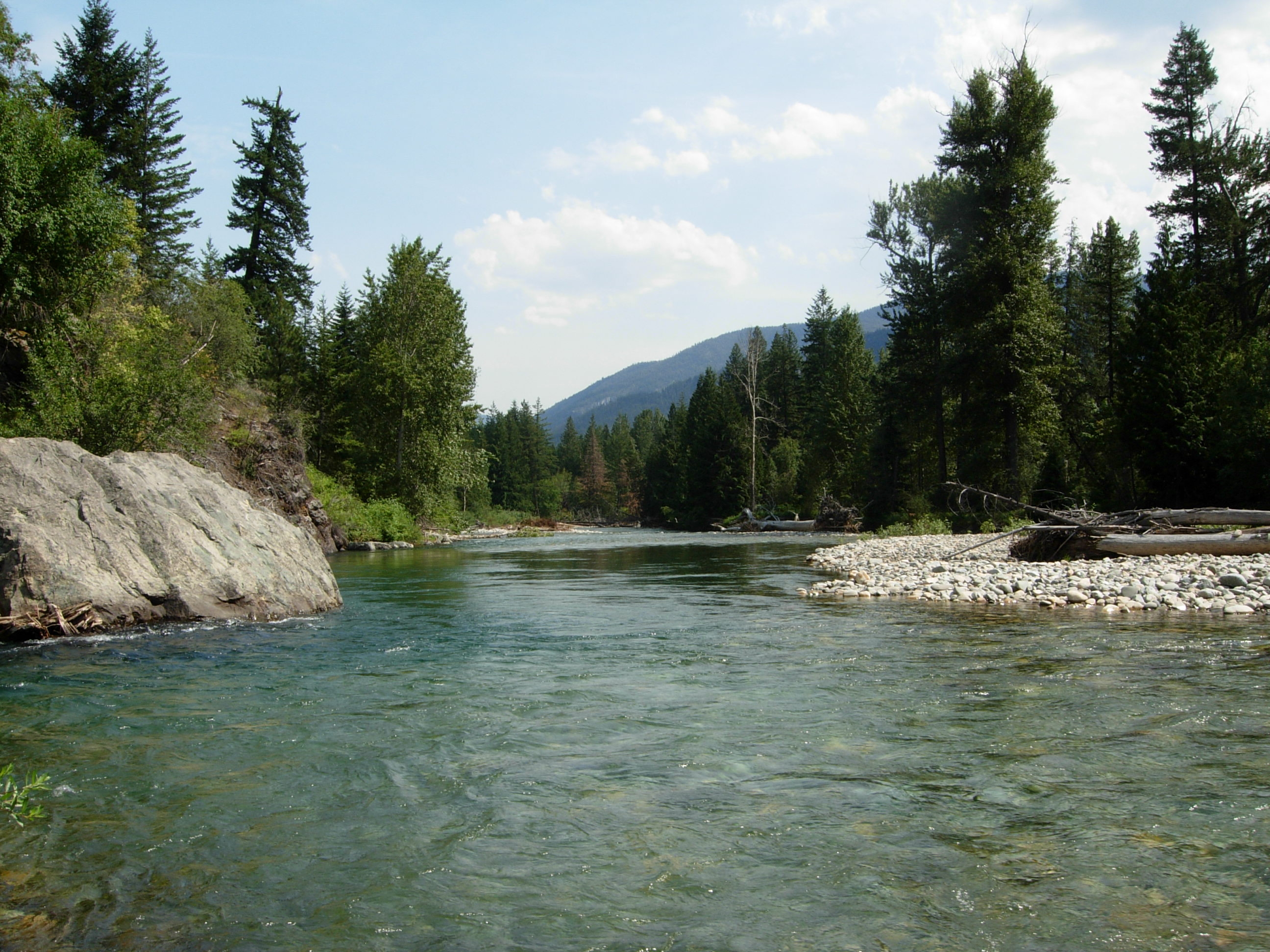
The Methow River at Mazama

The Methow River flows immediately to the south of Mazama, where it provides spawning habitat to spring Chinook salmon.

Forests of native Douglas-fir and Ponderosa pine are widespread in Mazama and its surroundings, with ample Cottonwood along creeks and rivers.

Over seventy species of mammals are indigenous to the area. This includes the Northern pocket gopher, but ironically, not the Mazama pocket gopher.

== Climate ==
Mazama has a humid continental climate (Köppen Dsb) with warm, dry summers, and cold, snowy winters. It lies immediately leeward of the North Cascades, which trap much of the precipitation carried from the Pacific Ocean by prevailing westerly winds. This rain shadow strengthens with increasing distance from the Cascade crest: semi-arid Winthrop, approximately 14 miles further down-valley, receives a little over half the annual precipitation of Mazama. Mazama’s relatively heavy snowfall, along with the brief hours of winter daylight in a deep mountain valley, inspired the first settlers to nickname the area "Early Winters."

Washington’s record cold temperature was measured in both Mazama and Winthrop: −48 °F (−44 °C) on December 30, 1968.

The average seasonal snowfall for the Mazama area is 119.7 inches, with an average of 136 days per year having at least 1 inch of snow on the ground. The greatest snow depth at any one time during the period of record, 62 inches, was recorded on January 1, 1997.

Climate data for Mazama, Washington, 1991–2020 normals, extremes 1965–present: 2141ft (653m)
Month	Jan	Feb	Mar	Apr	May	Jun	Jul	Aug	Sep	Oct	Nov	Dec	Year
Record high °F (°C)	58 (14)	55 (13)	74 (23)	90 (32)	97 (36)	112 (44)	109 (43)	106 (41)	104 (40)	84 (29)	65 (18)	64 (18)	112 (44)
Mean maximum °F (°C)	41.4 (5.2)	47.1 (8.4)	59.4 (15.2)	73.3 (22.9)	84.9 (29.4)	89.6 (32.0)	96.6 (35.9)	97.0 (36.1)	89.2 (31.8)	73.3 (22.9)	50.9 (10.5)	39.4 (4.1)	98.6 (37.0)
Mean daily maximum °F (°C)	29.2 (−1.6)	36.6 (2.6)	46.0 (7.8)	57.5 (14.2)	68.2 (20.1)	74.6 (23.7)	84.5 (29.2)	84.1 (28.9)	74.4 (23.6)	56.5 (13.6)	38.5 (3.6)	28.2 (−2.1)	56.5 (13.6)
Daily mean °F (°C)	22.5 (−5.3)	28.0 (−2.2)	35.9 (2.2)	45.0 (7.2)	54.8 (12.7)	61.5 (16.4)	69.6 (20.9)	68.7 (20.4)	59.4 (15.2)	45.0 (7.2)	31.7 (−0.2)	22.3 (−5.4)	45.4 (7.4)
Mean daily minimum °F (°C)	15.8 (−9.0)	19.3 (−7.1)	25.8 (−3.4)	32.6 (0.3)	41.4 (5.2)	48.4 (9.1)	54.7 (12.6)	53.3 (11.8)	44.5 (6.9)	33.6 (0.9)	24.9 (−3.9)	16.4 (−8.7)	34.2 (1.2)
Mean minimum °F (°C)	−5.9 (−21.1)	1.4 (−17.0)	12.7 (−10.7)	24.1 (−4.4)	29.1 (−1.6)	37.4 (3.0)	43.8 (6.6)	41.8 (5.4)	31.5 (−0.3)	20.6 (−6.3)	8.5 (−13.1)	−3.1 (−19.5)	−10.2 (−23.4)
Record low °F (°C)	−32 (−36)	−21 (−29)	−8 (−22)	10 (−12)	20 (−7)	26 (−3)	27 (−3)	32 (0)	19 (−7)	8 (−13)	−14 (−26)	−48 (−44)	−48 (−44)
Average precipitation inches (mm)	3.61 (92)	2.35 (60)	1.99 (51)	1.05 (27)	1.13 (29)	1.04 (26)	0.61 (15)	0.54 (14)	0.76 (19)	2.09 (53)	3.84 (98)	4.05 (103)	23.06 (587)
Average snowfall inches (cm)	34.3 (87)	19.6 (50)	11.2 (28)	0.2 (0.51)	0.0 (0.0)	0.0 (0.0)	0.0 (0.0)	0.0 (0.0)	0.0 (0.0)	2.3 (5.8)	17.6 (45)	37.9 (96)	123.1 (312.31)
Average extreme snow depth inches (cm)	36.2 (92)	36.4 (92)	31.1 (79)	8.6 (22)	0.0 (0.0)	0.0 (0.0)	0.0 (0.0)	0.0 (0.0)	0.0 (0.0)	1.7 (4.3)	10.6 (27)	26.2 (67)	41.5 (105)
Average precipitation days (≥ 0.01 in)	15.3	11.2	10.7	7.4	7.5	6.8	4.5	4.3	5.6	10.0	14.1	15.2	112.6
Average snowy days (≥ 0.1 in)	13.4	8.3	5.2	0.3	0.0	0.0	0.0	0.0	0.0	0.8	8.0	13.9	49.9
Source 1: NOAA
Source 2: XMACIS2

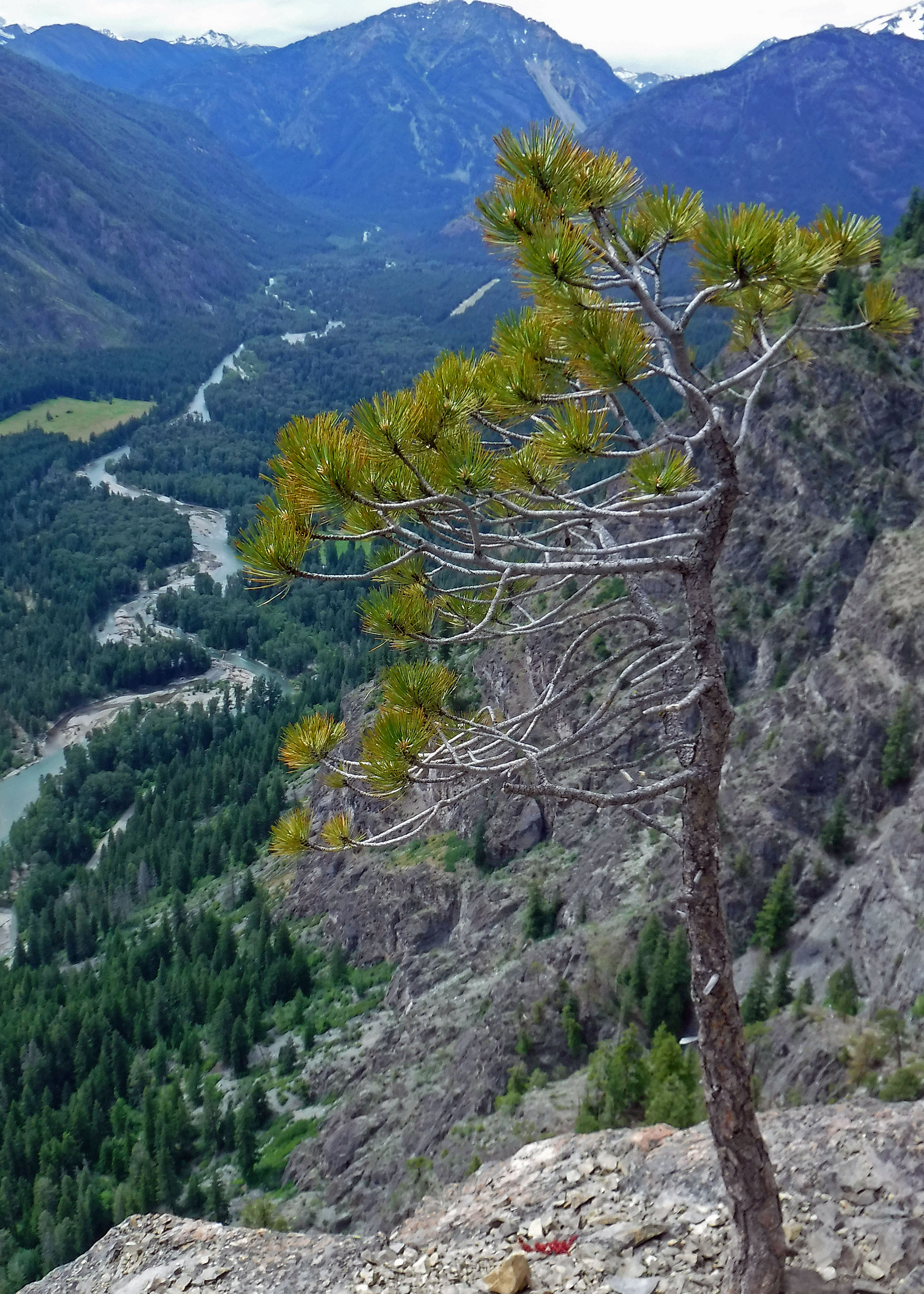
View of Methow River from Goat Wall, Prime Rib, overlooking the Methow Valley

== Geology ==
Geologic units in and near Mazama include Cretaceous andesite, diorite and plutonic rocks. At least one Middle Eocene dike intrudes a Cretaceous volcanic unit north of town. The Mesozoic units that make up the mountains that bracket Mazama are cut by thrust and transform faults. Quaternary alluvium floors the Methow River valley.

Soils are characteristically Leiko stony ashy sandy loam.

== Activities ==
The Mazama area offers cross-country skiing, snowshoeing, hiking, rock climbing, and mountaineering.

In the 1970s and 1980s, various proposals to build a ski resort on Sandy Butte near Mazama were submitted to the United States Forest Service amid opposition from local residents. It was planned to accommodate up to 8,200 skiers and cost $25 million to construct. The final iteration of the proposal, named Arrowleaf Resort, was withdrawn in 1999 following a ruling by the Washington State Department of Ecology that denied water rights for the project.

Mazama is also the location for one of the Outward Bound School's Northwest locations (NWOBS). NWOBS was founded in 1965.
