= Carroll Glacier =

Glacier in Alaska, United States

- Location within Alaska
- Interactive map of Carroll Glacier
- Location: Alaska, U.S.
- Coordinates: 59°05′03″N 136°38′42″W
- Length: 15 mi (24 km)

Carroll Glacier is a 15 mi (24 km) long glacier located in Glacier Bay National Park and Preserve in the U.S. state of Alaska. It begins near the Alaska-Canada border and continues southeast to its 1950 terminus, 1 mi (1.6 km) north of Queens Inlet, 71 mi (114 km) northwest of Hoonah.

== See also ==
- List of glaciers
