= Alsek Ranges =

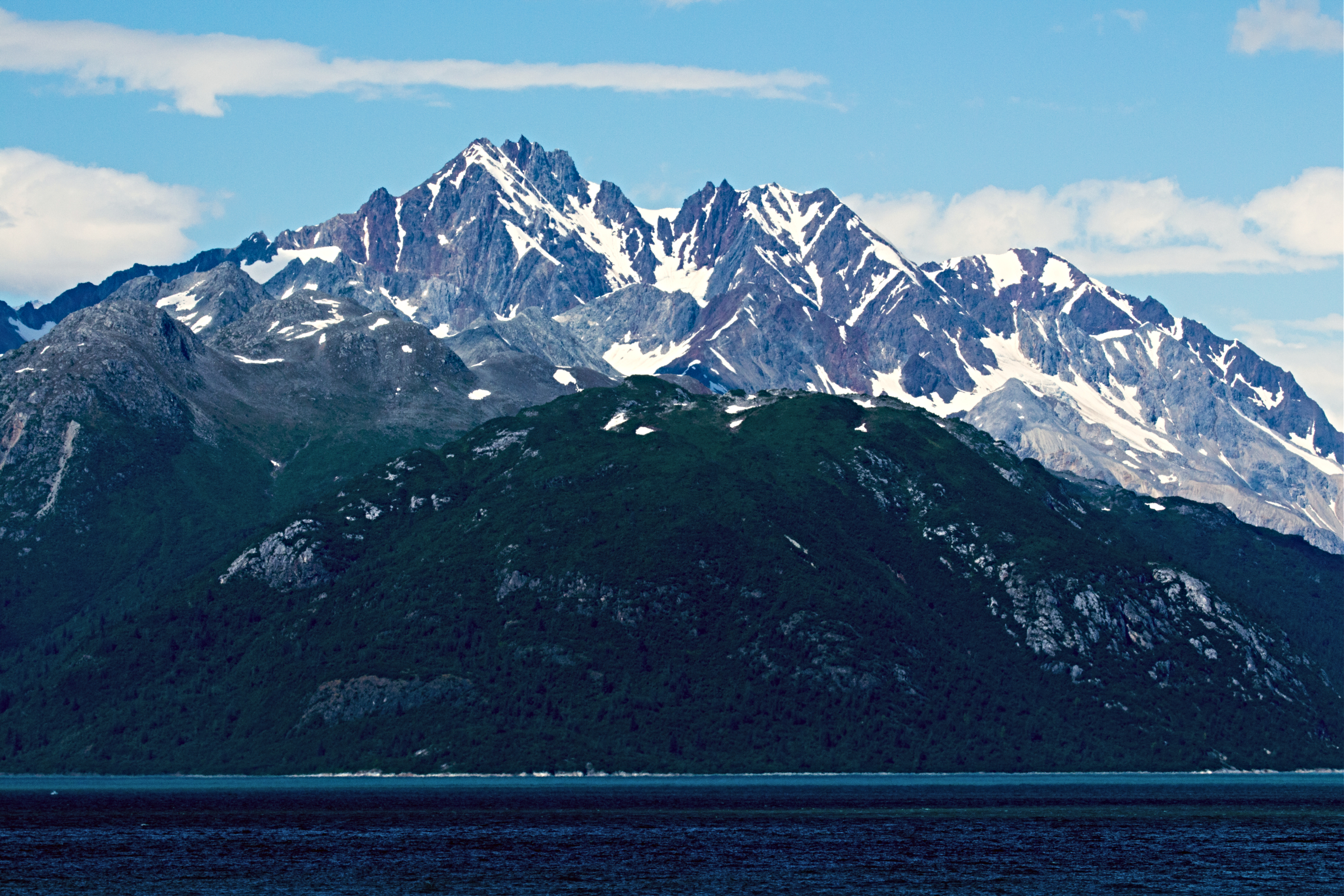
- Mount Abdallah in Glacier Bay

Highest point
- Peak: Buckwell Peak
- Elevation: 2,721 m (8,927 ft)
- Coordinates: 59°25′07″N 136°45′55″W

Dimensions
- Area: 33,131 km^{2} (12,792 mi^{2})

Geography
- Location within British Columbia
- Countries: Canada and United States
- Provinces/States: British Columbia, Yukon and Alaska
- Range coordinates: 59°30′59″N 137°22′07″W
- Parent range: Saint Elias Mountains
- Borders on: Fairweather Range

The Alsek Ranges are the southeasternmost subdivision of the Saint Elias Mountains of the Pacific Cordillera. They span the region between the Alsek River, Glacier Bay and the Kelsall River (which is the route of the highway from Haines, Alaska to Haines Junction, Yukon). Their western boundary is the Grand Pacific Glacier, beyond which is the Fairweather Range, another subdivision of the St. Elias Mountains. To their east is the northernmost section of the Boundary Ranges, the northernmost subdivision of the Coast Mountains and which are also known as the Alaska Boundary Range, and which run south to the Nass River and form, as their name indicates, the spine of the boundary between the American state of Alaska and the Canadian province of British Columbia.

All of the British Columbia portion of the Alsek Ranges are in the Tatshenshini-Alsek Park, but is also the location of the controversial Windy Craggy Mine proposal. Most of the Alaskan portion between the Lynn Canal and Glacier Bay is part of Glacier Bay National Park and Preserve, and most of the Yukon portion is in Kluane National Park and Reserve.
