= Allison Lake Provincial Park =

Provincial park in British Columbia, Canada

- IUCN category II (national park)
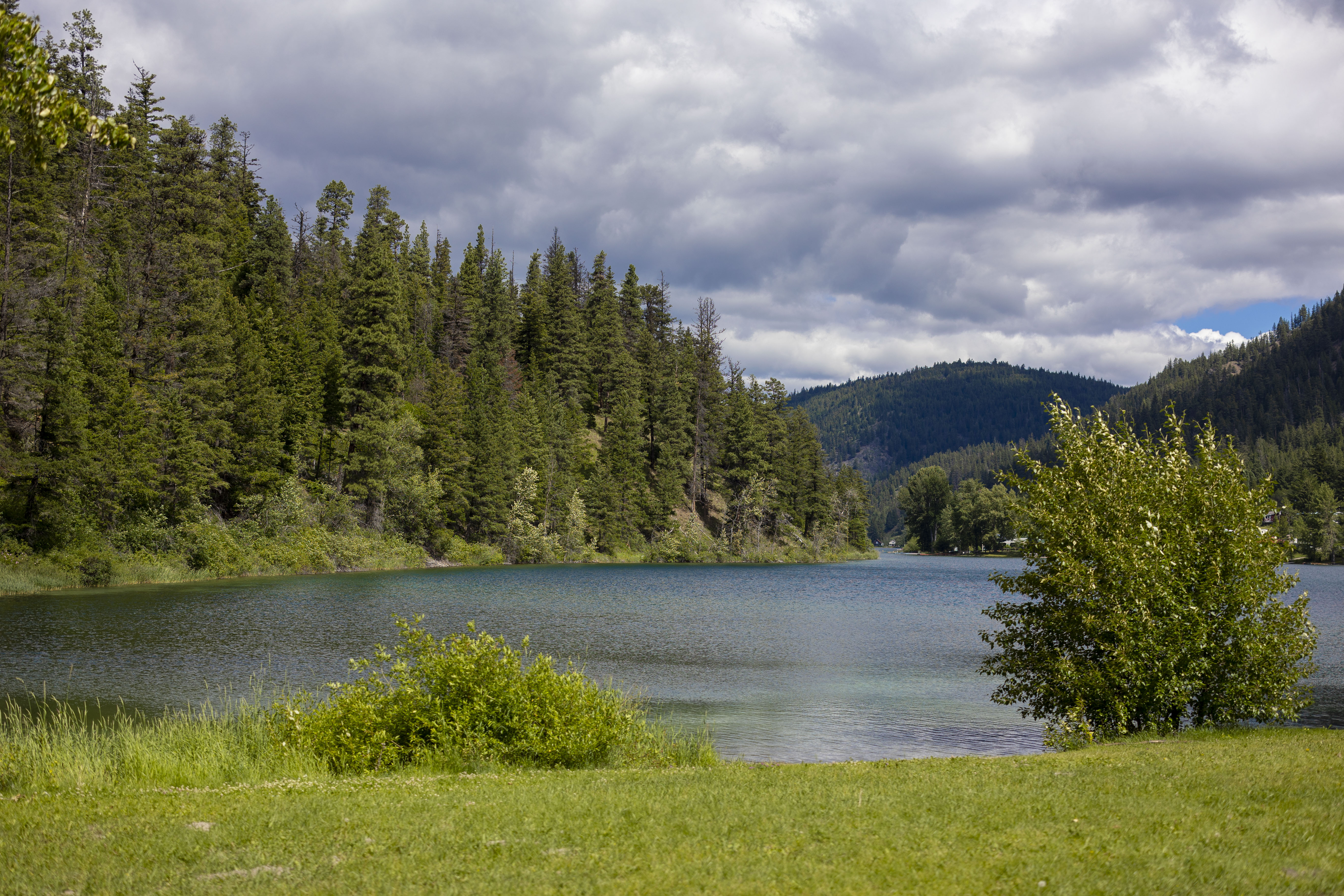

- Location within British Columbia
- Interactive map of Allison Lake Provincial Park
- Location: Princeton, British Columbia, Canada
- Nearest city: Princeton, British Columbia
- Coordinates: 49°40′54″N 120°36′04″W
- Area: 23 ha (57 acres)
- Established: July 26, 1960
- Governing body: BC Parks

Allison Lake Provincial Park is a provincial park in British Columbia, Canada, located 28 kilometres north of Princeton, British Columbia. The park, which is 23 ha. in size, was established July 26, 1960. It is mainly a recreation area, offering camping, swimming and fishing. The park contains mostly aspen.

== See also ==
- Allison Pass
- John Fall Allison
