= Princeton Secondary School =

Princeton Secondary

Location
- PO Box 500; Princeton, British Columbia, V0X 1W0; Canada; 49.4684°N 120.5033°W

Information
- School type: Public, high school
- School board: School District 58 Nicola-Similkameen
- School number: 58170084:20
- Principal: Mr. P. Kaiser
- Staff: 17
- Grades: 8-12
- Enrollment: 165 (2017)
- Language: English
- Colour: Blue/White
- Mascot: None
- Team name: Rapids

Princeton Secondary is a public high school in Princeton, British Columbia part of School District 58 Nicola-Similkameen.

== History ==
The current school building was constructed on the bluff above the town next to Princeton Aerodrome in 1981. It replaced the old high school located in town adjacent to the highway. The old school subsequently burned down in 1985.

The school was rented out to the Canadian Forces in the summer to house the Air Cadet Gliding School until 1992.
