= Susan Louisa Moir Allison =

Canadian author and pioneer (1845–1937)

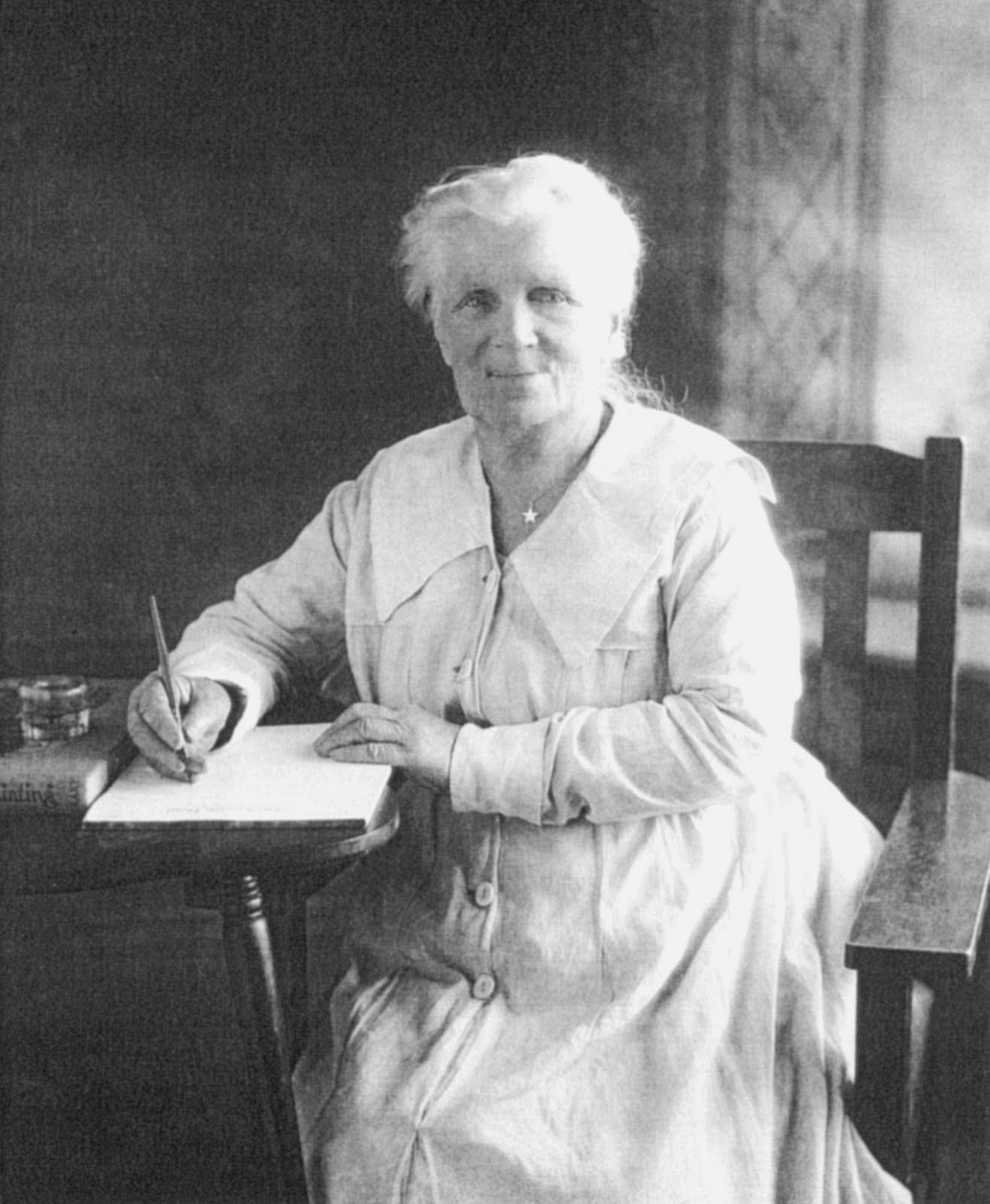
- Born: Susan Louisa Moir; August 18, 1845; British Ceylon
- Died: February 1, 1937 (aged 91); Vancouver, British Columbia, Canada
- Occupation: Writer
- Known for: Chronicling the Similkameen people

Susan Louisa Moir Allison (August 18, 1845 – February 1, 1937) was a Canadian author and pioneer. In 2010 Allison was designated a National Historic Person by the Canadian Government.

== Early life and education ==
Susan Louisa Moir was born on August 18, 1845, in Ceylon, where her father owned a tea plantation. When Susan's father died, her family, consisting of her mother, sister and brother, relocated to England, where she was educated. In 1857, Susan's mother remarried, this time to Thomas Glennie, a Scotsman. In 1860, when Susan was 14, Glennie moved the family to Hope, British Columbia. However, in 1864, Susan's stepfather deserted his new family, leaving her to work as a governess. Using this experience, Susan established Hope's first school with her mother, and subsequently married John Fall Allison, one of the founders of what is now Princeton, British Columbia, in 1868.

== Similkameen Valley ==
After their marriage, the Allisons moved to the Similkameen Valley, becoming the first non-Aboriginal settlers to live there. The couple, aided by John's knowledge of Chinook Jargon, a trade language, as a result of his previous marriage to an Indigenous woman, became close with nearby First Nations populations. There, the two produced 14 children. They ran a trading post that welcomed both Canadian and American visitors, including, in 1883, William Tecumseh Sherman. In the Valley, Allison had what she described as her happiest days, traversing nearby mountains on horseback and establishing relationships with nearby First Nations. Allison is also credited as the first non-native person in the Okanagan Valley to claim to have sighted Ogopogo, a lake monster in Okanagan Lake similar to the Loch Ness Monster.

== Writing career ==
Allison began writing in the late nineteenth century, drawing on her many years of residence in the Similkameen and Okanagan regions, as well as her relationships with Indigenous women she had known since the 1860s. She later recalled that these women shared stories and teachings with her that were not usually offered to settler audiences.

Her earliest known publications appeared in the 1890s. In 1891, an ethnographic paper of Allison's was published by the British Association for the Advancement of Science, and another in the Journal of the Royal Anthropological Institute of Great Britain and Ireland. She also wrote poetry and in 1900 she published a poem about an Indigenous chief.

After the death of her husband in 1897, Allison devoted more time to writing and to documenting the communities and landscapes she had known for decades. Much of this work eventually formed her memoirs, which describe settler life, relations with local First Nations, travel through the interior, and the hardships faced by her family. Literary critic George Woodcock later observed that her recollections offered a rare first-person perspective by a woman on pioneer life in British Columbia and compared the work to Susanna Moodie's nineteenth-century accounts of settlement, noting Allison's life-long interest in the land and its people.

Her memoirs, partially published in The Province in 1931, were edited and republished by the University of British Columbia Press in 1976 as A Pioneer Gentlewoman in British Columbia: The Recollections of Susan Allison, 39 years after her death.

Further writings attributed to Allison, including poems and retellings of Indigenous stories she learned in the 1800s, were later compiled in the collection In Her Words (2010), some of which were published under the pen name Stratton Moir.

== Later life and death ==
In her final years she was forced to gradually return to urban life, first moving back to Hope and then to Vancouver in 1928, where she died on February 1, 1937.

== Commemoration ==
On September 4, 2010, Allison was designated a National Historic Person by Jim Prentice, the Government of Canada's Minister for the Environment and Minister responsible for Parks Canada.

== Archival Holdings ==
- Papers of John Fall Allison and Susan Louisa Allison, MS-2692, Royal British Columbian Archives, Victoria, BC

== Bibliography ==
- Gresko, Jacqueline (2024). "MOIR, SUSAN LOUISA (Allison)". Dictionary of Canadian Biography, vol. 16.
