= School District 58 Nicola-Similkameen =

School district in British Columbia, Canada

Location
- Merritt Merritt, Princeton in Okanagan/Mainline Canada

District information
- Superintendent: Stephen McNiven
- Schools: 13
- Budget: CA$23.5 million

Students and staff
- Students: 2816

Other information
- Website: www.sd58.bc.ca

School District 58 Nicola-Similkameen is a school district in British Columbia.This includes the major centres of Merritt and Princeton.

The school district offers instruction in nɬeʔkepmxcín, an Interior Salishan language spoken by the Nlaka'pamux.

== History ==
School District 58 Nicola-Similkameen was created by the merger of the Merritt and Princeton School districts. Prior to the merger Princeton was School District 17 and Merritt was School District #31. Both the teachers' unions are employed by Nicola-Similkameen School district but have retained their original status within the British Columbia Teachers' Federation (BCTF). The respective unions are: Nicola Valley Teachers' Union (NVTU) - Local #31 of the BCTF and Princeton District Teachers' Union (PDTU) - Local #17 of the BCTF.

== Schools ==
School	Location	Grades
Collettville Elementary School (French Immersion)	Merritt	K-7
Continuing Ed SD 58	Princeton	9-12
Coquihalla Middle School (Closed 2012)	Merritt	4-7
Diamond Vale Elementary School	Merritt	K-7
John Allison Elementary School	Princeton	K-3
Kengard Alternate School	Merritt	8-12
Merritt Bench Elementary School	Merritt	K-7
Merritt Central Elementary School	Merritt	K-7
Merritt Secondary School	Merritt	8-12
Nicola Canford Elementary School	Lower Nicola	K-7
Princeton Secondary School	Princeton	8-12
SCIDES CoNNect School	Merritt	K-12
Vermilion Forks Elementary School	Princeton	4-7

== See also ==
- List of school districts in British Columbia
