= Princeton, British Columbia =

Town in British Columbia, Canada

Princeton
- Town
- Town of Princeton
- Location of Princeton in British Columbia
- Coordinates: 49°27′36″N 120°30′28″W
- Country: Canada
- Province: British Columbia
- Region: Similkameen Country
- Regional district: Okanagan-Similkameen
- Founded: 1858
- Incorporated (village): 1951
- Incorporated (town): 1978

Government
  - Governing body: Town Council
  - Mayor: Spencer Coyne

Area
  - Total: 59.28 km^{2} (22.89 sq mi)
- Elevation: 650 m (2,130 ft)

Population (2021)
  - Total: 2,894
  - Density: 48.82/km^{2} (126.4/sq mi)
- Time zone: UTC−07:00 (PT)
- Postal code: V0X 1W0 & V0X 2W0
- Area codes: 250, 778, 236, & 672
- Highways: Highway 3 Highway 5A
- Waterways: Tulameen River; Similkameen River
- Website: princeton.ca

Princeton is a town municipality in the Similkameen region of southern British Columbia, Canada. The former mining and railway hub lies at the confluence of the Tulameen into the Similkameen River, just east of the Cascade Mountains. At the junction of BC Highway 3 and 5A, the locality is by road about 67 kilometres (42 mi) northwest of Keremeos, 133 kilometres (83 mi) east of Hope, and 90 kilometres (56 mi) south of Merritt.

== First Nations and fur traders ==
The First Nations belong to the Interior Salish of the Thompson language group. In 1812, Alexander Ross of the Pacific Fur Company was the first European to explore the Similkameen River.

About 3 kilometres (2 mi) southwest of central Princeton are the ochre bluffs. Tulameen means "red earth" in the local language. This colour prompted the fur traders to call the river confluence Vermilion Forks.

The Vermilion Forks Indian Reserve No. 1, on the east shore adjacent to the town, belongs to the Upper Similkameen Band, whose band office is in Hedley.

== Earlier community ==
Arriving in 1860, during the Similkameen Gold Rush, Mr. John Fall Allison preempted 65 hectares (160 acres) of farmland immediately northeast of the river fork; the Marston family, who had preempted the present townsite, left in 1871. In 1868, Allison's second marriage was to Susan Louisa Moir; in 1888, he became the inaugural postmaster. He died in 1897.

About 4 kilometres (2.5 mi) downstream from the fork, the settlement of Prince Town was laid-out on the hillside, but was soon abandoned. The name was in honour of the Prince of Wales, future Edward VII, who made a royal visit to Eastern Canada in 1860. The revised spelling as "Princeton" was quickly adopted for settlement in the general area.

During the decade of 1860–1870, Princeton was the administrative centre for the Similkameen District. In the 1870s, the fork was a cattle centre from which herds were driven over the mountain trail to Hope. In the 1880s, Ah Tuck ran a log cabin Chinese boarding house. In 1897, James Wallace opened the large two-storey hotel called Wallace House, which fire destroyed in 1911. In 1899, John Henry Jackson completed the two-and-a-half-storey log hotel called Jackson House. On selling and enlarging in 1906, it was renamed the Great Northern Hotel but burned down in 1912.

By 1900, the town included a restaurant, two hotels, two livery stables, two butcher shops, two blacksmith shops, two laundries, three sawmills, and government buildings. That year, a newspaper was launched, and the Allison townsite was laid out in the vicinity of the earlier Prince Town (now encompassed by the Weyerhaeuser sawmill property). In partnership with Edgar Dewdney, the Allison family in due course promoted a rival townsite called Norman about 8 kilometres (5 mi) farther downriver. This venture proved unprofitable.

The three-storey, 20-room Tulameen Hotel was completed in 1902, but burned to the ground in 1904. The rebuild was in 1906 and demolition in 1960. The Similkameen Hotel was built in 1911 but burned down in 1930. Fires at the 40-room Princeton Hotel, which opened in 1912, caused severe damage in 1930 and complete destruction in 2006.

Princeton was incorporated as a village municipality in 1951 and as a town municipality in 1978.

In the 1980s, a downtown revitalization began, which included red brick sidewalks and new streetlights. In the 1990s, Princeton adopted a "heritage" theme, with many businesses converting their exteriors to match architectural styles from a century earlier.

== Industry ==
The British Columbia Copper Mining Co was formed in 1883 to acquire the mineral claims on Copper Mountain.

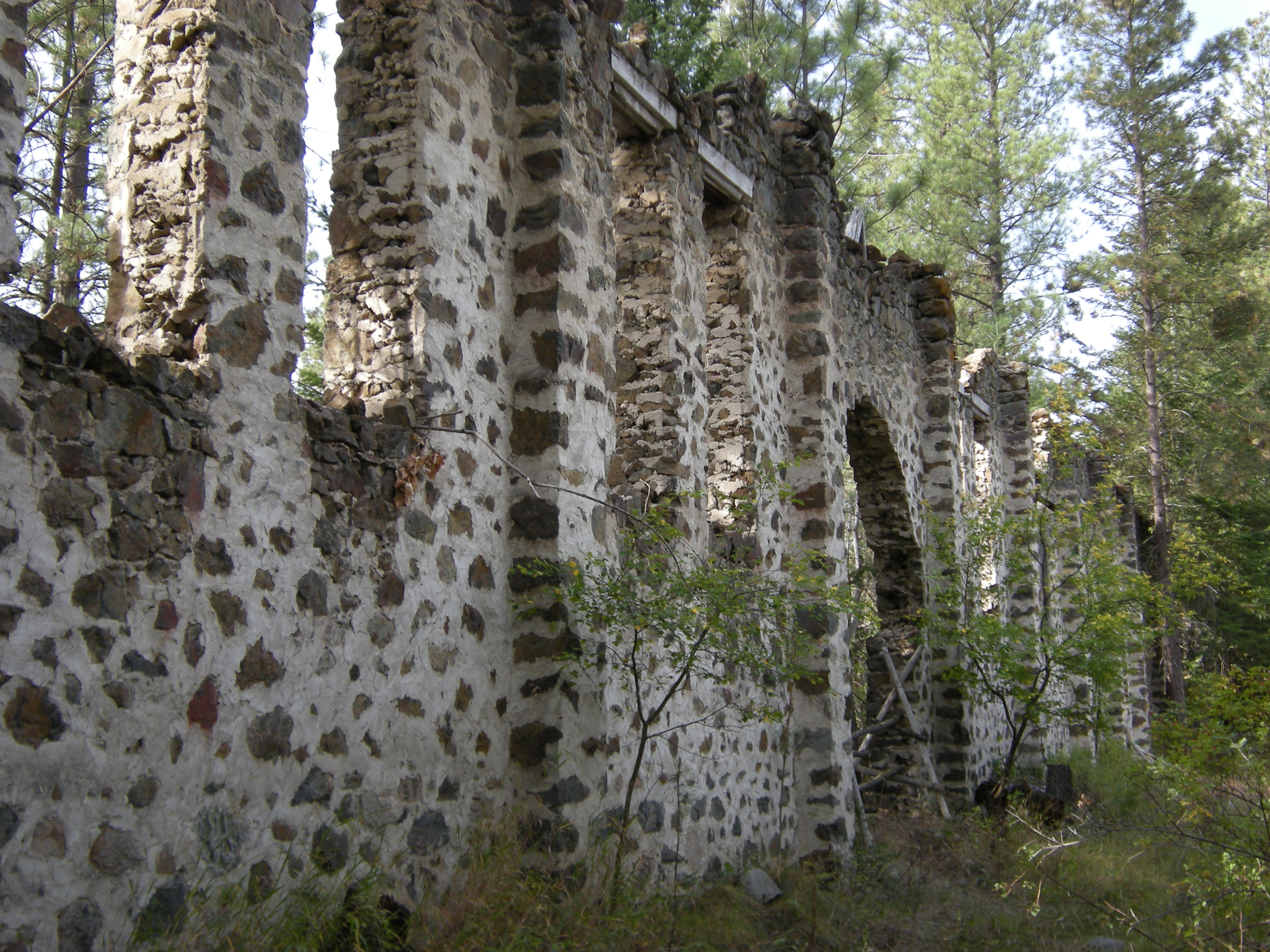
Castle ruins, Princeton, 2008

The town of Princeton relies heavily on the copper mining industry. The copper ore was originally found in 1883 and the first underground pit was opened in 1923 and continued running until 1957. Surface mining started at the mine back in 1979 and was later shut down in 1996. Copper Mountain Mine Corporation bought the mine in 2006 and started running operations in 2011. The mine is still called Copper Mountain Mine however it is now owned by Hudbay Minerals. This mine has generated income and jobs for Princeton locals and has become a tourist attraction for people across North America due to it being one of the largest copper mines in Canada.

Exploratory coal mining began in 1898.

The Princeton Brewing Co, which was founded in 1902, closed after the 1961 sale to the Molson Brewery group.

After investing $1 million in infrastructure, The British Columbia Portland Cement Company plant opened about 3 kilometres (2 mi) northeast in 1913 but closed weeks later. The ruins are part of the Rainbow Lake Castle Resort.

In 1910, water mains were installed. The providers of town electricity were Princeton Coal and Land 1911–1914 and then the copper mining company from 1915, running a line from the defunct cement plant. In 1917, West Kootenay Power agreed to extend a line from Bonnington Falls dam. In 1922, the Princeton Light and Power Co became the distributor.

Although forestry and mining have been the dominant industries since that time, tourism and agriculture developed in the latter half of the century, and pharmaceutical cannabis production emerged around 2020.

== Education and health ==
Princeton is part of School District 58 Nicola-Similkameen, and has two elementary schools (John Allison for grades K–3 and Vermilion Forks for grades 4–7), and Princeton Secondary School (for grades 8–12), which includes The Bridge (for adult learners who have not completed high school).

Interior Health provides level 1 health care at the Princeton General Hospital. The 6-bed acute care unit is complemented by a 36-bed extended care unit (Ridgewood Lodge).

The town also has a diabetes clinic, a mental health drop-in centre, and various counseling services to address needs such as balanced nutrition and substance abuse.

== Railways ==
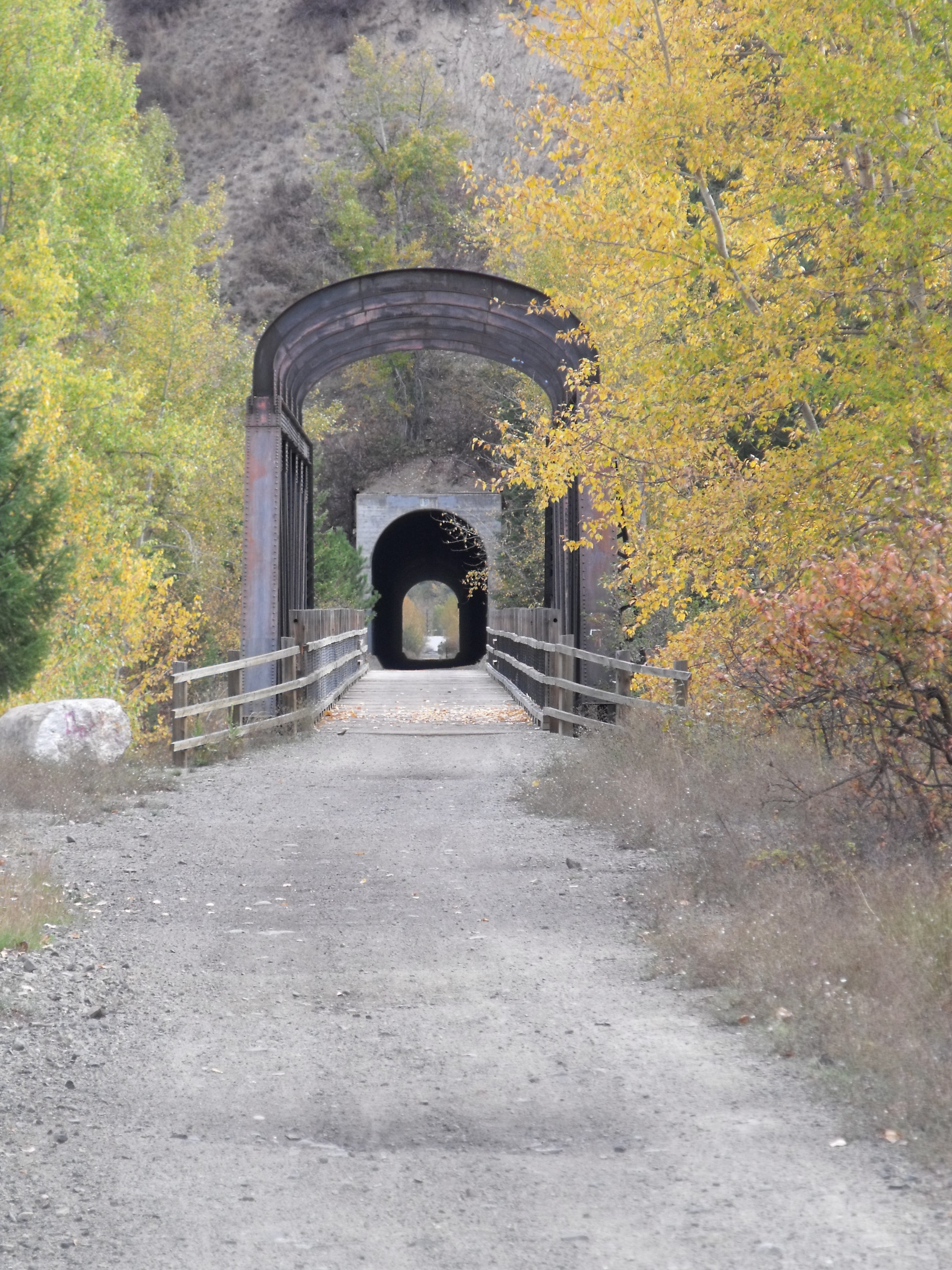
Eastward view of former railway bridge and tunnel, Princeton, 2010

The Great Northern Railway (GN) owned the Vancouver, Victoria and Eastern Railway (VV&E). In November 1909, the northwestward advance of the VV&E rail head crossed the falsework of the Similkameen rail bridge and entered Princeton. In July 1911, tracklaying continued westward through the tunnel excavated beneath Bromley Ridge.

The Canadian Pacific Railway (CP) owned the Kettle Valley Railway (KV). In April 1915, the westward extension of the KV rail head crossed the Tulameen River and joined the GN track in Princeton.

In October 1920, the CP branch from Princeton to Copper Mountain was completed.

== Ferries and road/pedestrian bridges ==
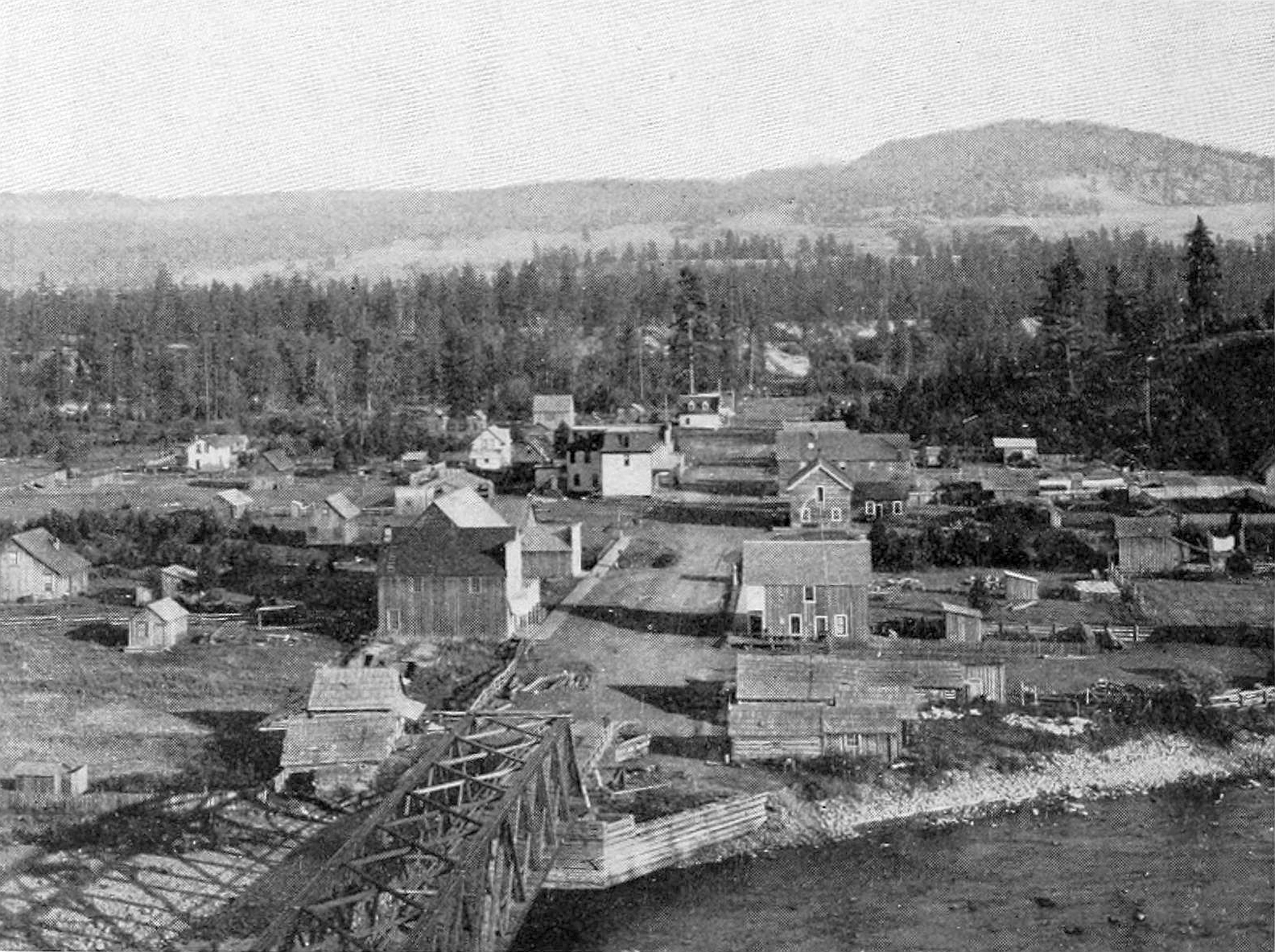
Bridge St. southward, Princeton, 1911

Prior to 1949, the main thoroughfare was via the Merritt area. A bridge over the Tulameen (originally called the North Fork of the Similkameen) was washed out during the 1870s. Subsequently, First Nations provided an informal canoe service, but users demanded a government bridge because the ferry charges were considered exorbitant. In 1885, a two-truss-span bridge was erected.

In May 1900, a ferry was installed across the Similkameen to facilitate bridge construction. In March 1901, this Howe truss at the south end of Bridge St was completed, but an ice floe damaged the middle pier and shattered the southern abutment of the Tulameen bridge. At the time, C.O. French had been operating an aerial ferry over the Similkameen about 3 kilometres (2 mi) upstream. That August, the Tulameen bridge was completely rebuilt as a Howe truss.

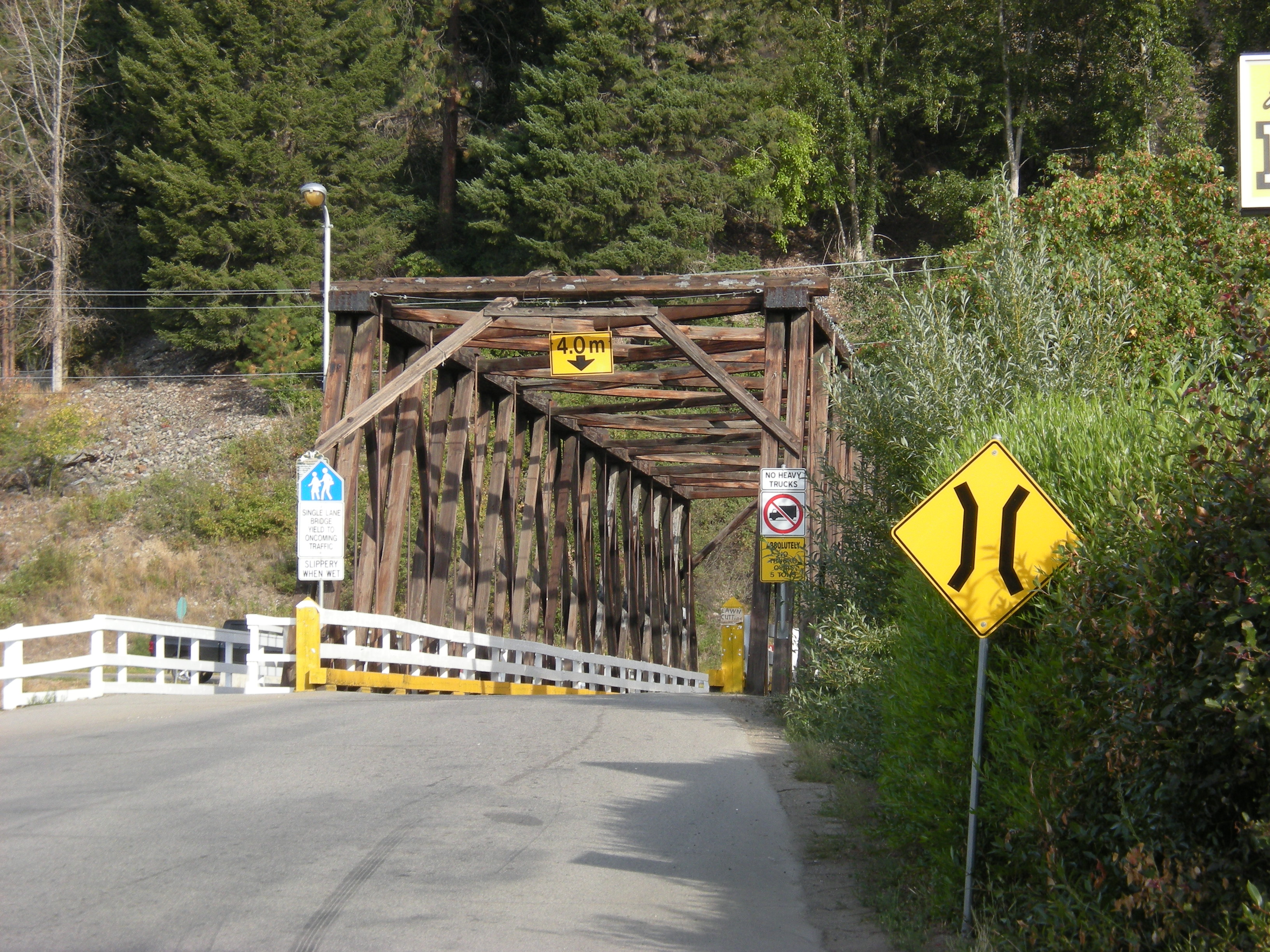
Brown Bridge, Princeton, 2008

In 1918, a two-span Howe truss was built alongside the Similkameen bridge, and the former bridge was demolished the following year.

Built in the 1930s, the replacement single-lane wooden Tulameen crossing is known as the Brown Bridge. In 2018, a semi-trailer caused structural damages to the bridge, one of many such incidents.

The steel truss, which replaced the Similkameen bridge in 1948, was replaced by a concrete-decked span in 2003.

In 1964, the present steel highway bridge over the Tulameen opened.

In 2009, the award-winning Bridge of Dreams was built upon the substructure of the 1915 KV bridge.

== Road and air transport ==
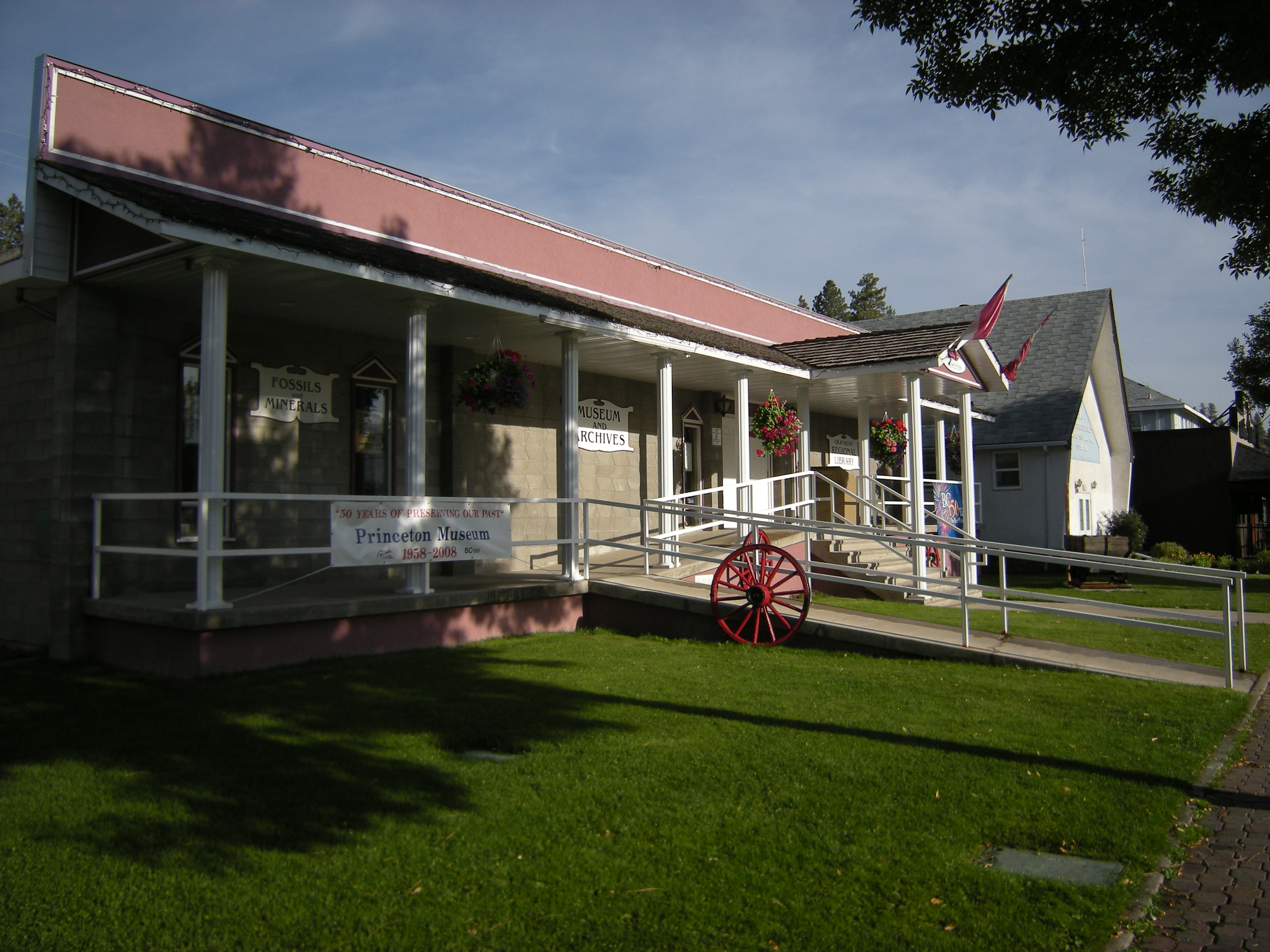
Princeton Museum, 2008

The development of road links is shown in maps for 1873, 1925, 1937, and 1956.

By 1899, the stage journey from Spences Bridge took three and a half days. Two operators provided a weekly stage on the route.

In 1901, the Princeton–Hedley–Keremeos road was built, the initial section being the Old Hedley Rd.

In 1920, a Merritt–Princeton auto stage commenced. In 1928, the road to Merritt was upgraded to highway status. Coalmont Road, which had formed the southern end, was replaced by the present section via Allison Lake.

Placing the highway upon the abandoned VV&E right-of-way along the south bank and superseding the Princeton-Stemwinder section of the Old Hedley Rd, paving was tendered in May 1947 for the adjoining section southeastward. In November 1949, the Hope–Princeton highway opened.

By 1960, Greyhound had abandoned the Merritt–Princeton route. In September 1961, the replacement operator discontinued the run.

In June 2018, Greyhound abandoned the Hope–Penticton route, which included Princeton. The summer bus service between Kaslo and Vancouver, instituted by a regional operator in June 2019, routed through Princeton. By 2023, the twice weekly service, which stopped in Princeton, had become year round.

The South Okanagan-Similkameen Transit System operates a three times weekly schedule along the Princeton-Penticton corridor, with connections to other BC Transit services at Penticton.

Princeton Aerodrome is not served by any scheduled carriers and has extremely limited facilities. It was formerly home to an Air Cadet Gliding Program. The nearest airport with regional scheduled passenger services is Penticton Regional Airport, and with both regional and international destinations is Kelowna International Airport.

== Filming location ==
In 1987, Burt Reynolds starred in the film Malone, which was filmed mainly in neighbouring Hedley, but included key scenes in downtown Princeton and the surrounding area. Also partly shot in the area was Sean Penn's 2001 film The Pledge, starring Jack Nicholson, which was also filmed in Lytton and Lillooet.

== Notable people ==
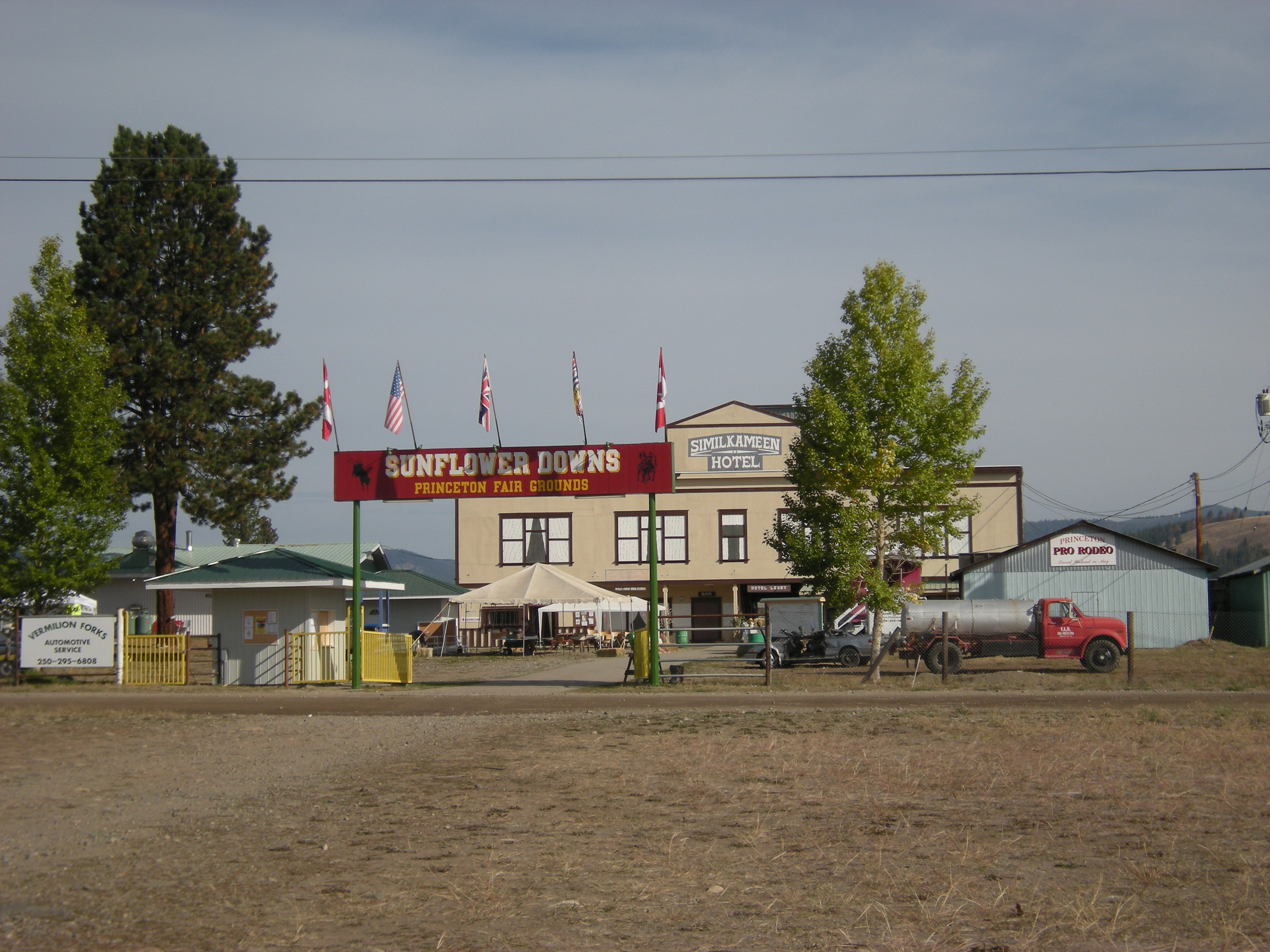
Sunflower Downs, fairgrounds, Princeton, 2008

- Shawn Brenneman (1973–), darts player, resident.
- Isabel Dawson (1917–1982), politician, resident.
- Gordon Lionel Gibson (1913–1998), politician, place of birth, resident.
- John Carmichael Haynes (1831–1888), judge and public servant, place of death.
- Linda Hughes (1950–), newspaper publisher, place of birth.
- Albert Irwin (1917–2006), skier, place of birth.
- Trevor Josephson (1951–), rower, place of birth.
- Fred Norcross (1884–1965), football player/coach and mining engineer, resident 1915–1917.
- Stephen Peat (1980–), ice hockey player, place of birth.
- James Rabbitt (1941–), politician, place of birth.

== Later community ==
In 2016, the Similkameen News Leader ceased publication.

The 2021 flood submerged half the town after the rivers overflowed their banks and dikes. Water levels were 150 centimetres (59 in) higher than the 1995 flood.

In the early 2020s, the downtown was again revitalized with the placement of bronze wildlife statues, sidewalk upgrades, and visitor centre and RV campground enhancements, partially financed by a $750,000 federal government grant.

Census population: Princeton
Year	Pop.	±%
1956	2,245	—
1961	2,163	−3.7%
1966	2,151	−0.6%
1971*	2,607	+21.2%
1976	3,132	+20.1%
1981	3,051	−2.6%
1986	2,910	−4.6%
1991*	2,839	−2.4%
1996	2,826	−0.5%
2001	2,610	−7.6%
2006*	2,780	+6.5%
2011	2,724	−2.0%
2016	2,828	+3.8%
2021	2,894	+2.3%
Source: Statistics Canada * Revised figure

In 2023, 20 new temporary homes opened for seniors displaced by the 2021 flood.

Community services are typical for a town of this size.

== Culture and leisure ==
In addition to camping, fishing, hunting, and golf, popular activities include:

- Bronze Sculpture Walk, which comprises wildlife sculptures along the main streets.
- The Princeton and District Museum and Archives houses a fossil collection, First Nations artifacts, pioneer life exhibits, a 1900 stagecoach, and 1934 fire engine. The museum features a small exhibition on First Nations culture and language of the Upper Similkameen (Upper Smelqmix) Nsyilxcən-speaking people centred around the importance of water.
- Biking or hiking the KVR or China Ridge trails in summer and cross country skiing and snow shoeing the trails during winter.
- Manning Park to the west offers a similar range of outdoor activities.

Annual events include The Princeton Pro Rodeo, Family Day, and Canada Day celebrations.

Important facilities are the Centennial Pool, 700-seat hockey arena, curling rink, and 14 local parks.

== Demographics ==
In the 2021 Census of Population conducted by Statistics Canada, Princeton had a population of 2,894 living in 1,377 of its 1,521 total private dwellings, a change of 2.3% from its 2016 population of 2,828. With a land area of 59.28 km^{2} (22.89 sq mi), it had a population density of 48.8/km^{2} (126.4/sq mi) in 2021.

=== Ethnicity ===
Panethnic groups in the Town of Princeton (1986−2021)
Panethnic group	2021		2016		2011		2006		2001		1996		1991		1986	
Panethnic group	Pop.	%	Pop.	%	Pop.	%	Pop.	%	Pop.	%	Pop.	%	Pop.	%	Pop.	%
European (Note: Statistic includes all persons that did not make up part of a visible minority or an indigenous identity.)	2,235	79.68%	2,415	87.5%	2,435	91.54%	2,410	91.29%	2,425	94.73%	2,605	93.2%	2,635	95.3%	2,680	93.71%
Indigenous	355	12.66%	280	10.14%	210	7.89%	210	7.95%	105	4.1%	75	2.68%	60	2.17%	130	4.55%
Southeast Asian (Note: Statistic includes total responses of "Filipino" and "Southeast Asian" under visible minority section on census.)	75	2.67%	30	1.09%	0	0%	10	0.38%	10	0.39%	10	0.36%	15	0.54%	0	0%
South Asian	65	2.32%	15	0.54%	0	0%	0	0%	0	0%	0	0%	10	0.36%	10	0.35%
East Asian (Note: Statistic includes total responses of "Chinese", "Korean", and "Japanese" under visible minority section on census.)	40	1.43%	10	0.36%	10	0.38%	10	0.38%	20	0.78%	70	2.5%	35	1.27%	35	1.22%
African	15	0.53%	10	0.36%	0	0%	10	0.38%	0	0%	25	0.89%	0	0%	0	0%
Latin American	10	0.36%	0	0%	0	0%	0	0%	0	0%	0	0%	0	0%	5	0.17%
Middle Eastern (Note: Statistic includes total responses of "West Asian" and "Arab" under visible minority section on census.)	0	0%	10	0.36%	0	0%	0	0%	0	0%	0	0%	10	0.36%	0	0%
Other/multiracial (Note: Statistic includes total responses of "Visible minority, n.i.e." and "Multiple visible minorities" under visible minority section on census.)	25	0.89%	0	0%	0	0%	0	0%	0	0%	0	0%	—N/a	—N/a	—N/a	—N/a
Total responses	2,805	96.92%	2,760	97.6%	2,660	97.65%	2,640	98.62%	2,560	98.08%	2,795	98.9%	2,765	98.89%	2,860	98.28%
Total population	2,894	100%	2,828	100%	2,724	100%	2,677	100%	2,610	100%	2,826	100%	2,796	100%	2,910	100%
Note: Totals greater than 100% due to multiple origin responses.

=== Religion ===
According to the 2021 census, religious groups in Princeton included:

- Irreligion (1,785 persons or 63.6%)
- Christianity (940 persons or 33.5%)
- Sikhism (30 persons or 1.1%)
- Other (25 persons or 0.9%)

== Climate ==
Princeton has a continental climate (Köppen Dfb) with semi-arid influences. It is located just east of the Cascade mountains, giving the town a rain shadow effect whereby the community receives very little precipitation relative to areas on the windward side of the Cascade mountains. Princeton is one of the sunniest places in British Columbia with 2,088 hours of sunshine annually. The 323 days per year with measurable sunshine, defined by having a minimum of 6 minutes of sunshine in a day, is the most in the province, and one of the highest in Canada. The 29.4 days with measurable sunshine in March is the highest in the country.

Climate data for Princeton Aerodrome, 1981–2010 normals, extremes 1893–present.^{a}
Month	Jan	Feb	Mar	Apr	May	Jun	Jul	Aug	Sep	Oct	Nov	Dec	Year
Record high °C (°F)	13.3 (55.9)	18.3 (64.9)	23.5 (74.3)	31.7 (89.1)	36.3 (97.3)	44.2 (111.6)	41.7 (107.1)	38.7 (101.7)	38.8 (101.8)	30.2 (86.4)	21.1 (70.0)	15.4 (59.7)	44.2 (111.6)
Mean daily maximum °C (°F)	−1.4 (29.5)	2.6 (36.7)	9.1 (48.4)	14.4 (57.9)	18.8 (65.8)	22.3 (72.1)	26.3 (79.3)	26.7 (80.1)	21.7 (71.1)	13.2 (55.8)	3.5 (38.3)	−2.4 (27.7)	12.9 (55.2)
Daily mean °C (°F)	−5.0 (23.0)	−2.3 (27.9)	2.8 (37.0)	7.1 (44.8)	11.3 (52.3)	14.8 (58.6)	17.9 (64.2)	17.9 (64.2)	13.2 (55.8)	6.8 (44.2)	−0.3 (31.5)	−5.6 (21.9)	6.6 (43.9)
Mean daily minimum °C (°F)	−8.6 (16.5)	−7.2 (19.0)	−3.4 (25.9)	−0.3 (31.5)	3.7 (38.7)	7.3 (45.1)	9.5 (49.1)	9.0 (48.2)	4.7 (40.5)	0.3 (32.5)	−4.0 (24.8)	−8.9 (16.0)	0.2 (32.4)
Record low °C (°F)	−45.0 (−49.0)	−41.7 (−43.1)	−33.3 (−27.9)	−13.9 (7.0)	−8.3 (17.1)	−3.9 (25.0)	−0.6 (30.9)	−4.4 (24.1)	−10.6 (12.9)	−23.1 (−9.6)	−34.5 (−30.1)	−42.8 (−45.0)	−45.0 (−49.0)
Average precipitation mm (inches)	39.7 (1.56)	20.5 (0.81)	16.5 (0.65)	18.4 (0.72)	29.6 (1.17)	37.6 (1.48)	29.6 (1.17)	24.3 (0.96)	23.8 (0.94)	26.1 (1.03)	44.5 (1.75)	36.4 (1.43)	346.9 (13.66)
Average rainfall mm (inches)	12.1 (0.48)	7.7 (0.30)	8.0 (0.31)	16.7 (0.66)	28.9 (1.14)	37.6 (1.48)	29.6 (1.17)	24.3 (0.96)	23.7 (0.93)	23.5 (0.93)	26.9 (1.06)	6.7 (0.26)	245.7 (9.67)
Average snowfall cm (inches)	33.9 (13.3)	16.2 (6.4)	10.2 (4.0)	1.9 (0.7)	0.7 (0.3)	0.0 (0.0)	0.0 (0.0)	0.0 (0.0)	0.1 (0.0)	3.0 (1.2)	21.6 (8.5)	37.7 (14.8)	125.1 (49.3)
Average precipitation days (≥ 0.2 mm)	13.5	9.2	9.2	9.5	11.3	11.0	8.2	7.1	7.8	10.8	13.4	12.6	123.5
Average rainy days (≥ 0.2 mm)	3.7	3.4	5.7	8.4	11.0	11.0	8.2	7.1	7.8	10.0	8.0	2.5	86.8
Average snowy days (≥ 0.2 cm)	11.6	6.9	4.7	1.6	0.4	0.0	0.0	0.0	0.0	1.3	7.2	11.4	45.1
Average relative humidity (%)	80.7	69.1	50.3	40.4	39.8	40.1	35.8	34.1	37.6	50.6	73.1	81.7	52.8
Mean monthly sunshine hours	59.0	99.8	159.9	199.6	247.3	255.5	300.2	285.3	219.3	146.9	66.6	48.2	2,087.5
Percentage possible sunshine	21.9	35.0	43.5	48.5	52.0	52.6	61.2	63.9	57.8	43.8	24.2	18.8	43.6
Source: Environment Canada

^a. Extreme high and low temperatures were recorded at Princeton from July 1936 to May 1942 and at Princeton Aerodrome from November 1936 to present.

== See also ==
- Royal eponyms in Canada
