= Merritt Secondary School =

Location
- PO Box 5100; Merritt, British Columbia, V1K 1B8; Canada; 50.1090°N 120.7960°W

Information
- School type: Public, high school
- School board: School District 58 Nicola-Similkameen
- Superintendent: Stephen McNiven
- School number: 5831005
- Principal: Adriane Mouland
- Colour
- Team name: Panthers

Merritt Secondary is a public high school in Merritt, British Columbia, part of School District 58 Nicola-Similkameen.

MSS offers many sports and extracurriculars for students to choose from, including volleyball, basketball, soccer, ultimate frisbee, rugby (girls), and field hockey (girls).
