= Allison Pass =

Mountain pass in British Columbia, Canada

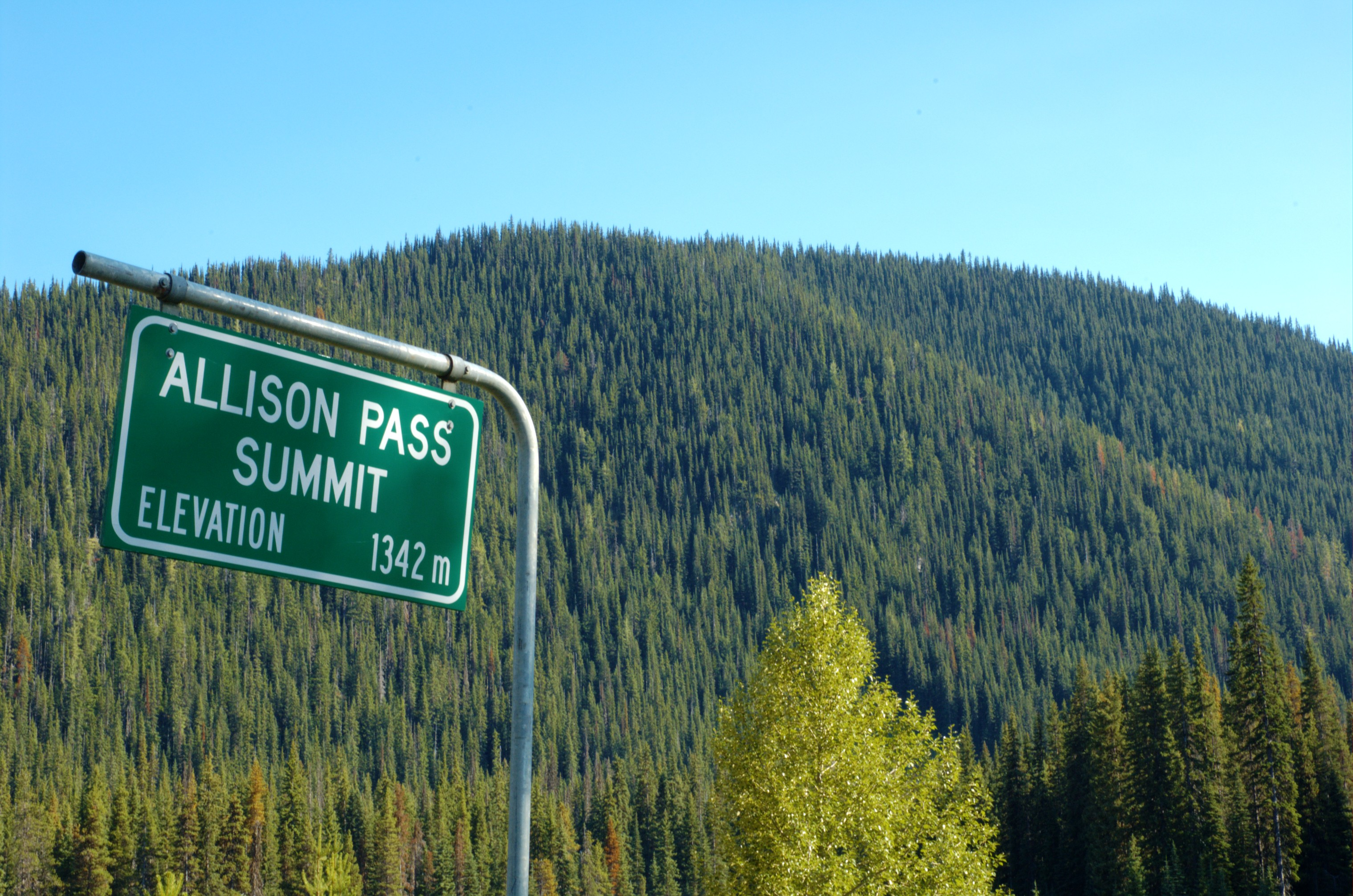
- At the summit of Allison Pass

- Location within British Columbia
- Elevation: 1,342 metres (4,403 ft)
- Traversed by: Highway 3 (Crowsnest Highway)

Third Approach
- Location: British Columbia, Canada
- Range: Canadian Cascades
- Coordinates: 49°7′N 120°52′W
- Topo map: NTS 92H2 Manning Park

Allison Pass (el. 1,342 m or 4,403 ft) is a highway summit along the Crowsnest Highway in British Columbia, Canada. It is the highest point on the section of highway between the cities of Hope and Princeton. It is located in the middle of Manning Park, at the divide between the Skagit & Similkameen River drainages (and thus the watersheds of the Salish Sea and the Columbia River), as well as on the boundary between the Fraser Valley and Okanagan-Similkameen Regional Districts, approximately 12 km (7 mi) west of the Manning Resort and 54 km (34 mi) from Hope. The Skagit River originates at the pass while the Similkameen River originates just north of it.

Cyclists and motorists alike find this stretch of road difficult because of the steep grades and high altitudes. On the way from Hope to Allison Pass, one must ascend the 7% (1 in 14) grades up to the Hope Slide before one can start up to Allison Pass, leaving many trucks waiting at the side of the road for their engines to cool down.

== History ==
The pass was named after John Fall Allison, a rancher living in Princeton.

== Climate ==
Climate data for Allison Pass
Month	Jan	Feb	Mar	Apr	May	Jun	Jul	Aug	Sep	Oct	Nov	Dec	Year
Record high °C (°F)	7.8 (46.0)	12.2 (54.0)	16.7 (62.1)	17.2 (63.0)	24.4 (75.9)	31.1 (88.0)	31.7 (89.1)	31.7 (89.1)	27.2 (81.0)	23.3 (73.9)	12.2 (54.0)	8.3 (46.9)	31.7 (89.1)
Mean daily maximum °C (°F)	−4.1 (24.6)	−0.9 (30.4)	1.9 (35.4)	6.4 (43.5)	10.5 (50.9)	14.8 (58.6)	19.8 (67.6)	19.2 (66.6)	15.0 (59.0)	8.2 (46.8)	0.3 (32.5)	−2.9 (26.8)	7.4 (45.2)
Daily mean °C (°F)	−7.9 (17.8)	−5.4 (22.3)	−3.5 (25.7)	0.8 (33.4)	4.5 (40.1)	8.3 (46.9)	12.1 (53.8)	11.7 (53.1)	8.3 (46.9)	3.0 (37.4)	−3.4 (25.9)	−6.5 (20.3)	1.8 (35.3)
Mean daily minimum °C (°F)	−11.7 (10.9)	−9.8 (14.4)	−8.8 (16.2)	−4.7 (23.5)	−1.5 (29.3)	1.6 (34.9)	4.3 (39.7)	4.2 (39.6)	1.5 (34.7)	−2.2 (28.0)	−7.0 (19.4)	−10.0 (14.0)	−3.7 (25.4)
Record low °C (°F)	−34.4 (−29.9)	−25.6 (−14.1)	−26.7 (−16.1)	−16.1 (3.0)	−11.7 (10.9)	−5.0 (23.0)	−2.2 (28.0)	−2.2 (28.0)	−6.7 (19.9)	−17.8 (0.0)	−30.0 (−22.0)	−42.8 (−45.0)	−42.8 (−45.0)
Average precipitation mm (inches)	262.9 (10.35)	174.7 (6.88)	143.6 (5.65)	85.5 (3.37)	73.7 (2.90)	74.1 (2.92)	30.2 (1.19)	45.9 (1.81)	64.3 (2.53)	103.1 (4.06)	188.7 (7.43)	277.8 (10.94)	1,524.5 (60.03)
Average snowfall cm (inches)	240.2 (94.6)	163.7 (64.4)	125.0 (49.2)	75.1 (29.6)	24.3 (9.6)	0.3 (0.1)	0.2 (0.1)	0.0 (0.0)	3.3 (1.3)	35.3 (13.9)	146.2 (57.6)	207.9 (81.9)	1,021.5 (402.3)
Average precipitation days	20	17	17	12	13	12	7	9	12	14	19	22	174
Source: Environment and Climate Change Canada
