= Flood, British Columbia =

Coordinates: 49°22′00″N 121°31′00″W

Flood is a rural community in the District of Hope, British Columbia, Canada, located west of the town of Hope on the south bank of the Fraser River in the far eastern end of the Fraser Valley region. It is primarily agricultural in nature. Its official name is Floods, though it is usually referred to by its post office name in the singular, Flood.

== See also ==
- Hope Aerodrome
