= Hope Aerodrome =

Airport in British Columbia, Canada

- IATA: YHE; ICAO: CYHE; WMO: 71114

Summary
- Airport type: Public
- Operator: Fraser Valley Regional District
- Location: Hope, British Columbia
- Time zone: MST (UTC−07:00)
- Elevation AMSL: 128 ft / 39 m
- Coordinates: 49°22′06″N 121°29′53″W

Map
- Location in British Columbia CYHE (Canada)

Runways
Direction	Length		Surface
Direction	ft	m	Surface
07/25	3,960	1,207	Turf
- Source: Canada Flight Supplement; Environment Canada

Hope Aerodrome (IATA: YHE, ICAO: CYHE) is located 2.6 nautical miles (4.8 km; 3.0 mi) west of Hope Townsite (the previous Town of Hope) within the municipal District of Hope, British Columbia, Canada.

The airfield is home to the Vancouver Soaring Association, a gliding club owning and operating seven school and recreational sailplanes and two Cessna L-19 Bird Dog as tow planes.

There is one turf runway, 3,960 ft × 250 ft (1,207 m × 76 m). The airport is operated by the Fraser Valley Regional District. The Hope Airport lies within the community of Flood in the District of Hope.

== History ==
In approximately 1942 the aerodrome was listed as RCAF & D of T Aerodrome - Hope, British Columbia at 49°22′N 121°29′W with a variation of 23 degrees 40' east and elevation of 117 ft (36 m). The aerodrome was listed as "under construction - servicable" with one runway listed as follows:

Runway name	Length	Width	Surface
7/25	6,400 ft (2,000 m)	1,000 ft (300 m)	Turf

Hope is notable as being the location of a Boeing demonstration of the Boeing 737's landing and take-off abilities in 1972.

== See also ==
- List of airports in the Lower Mainland
