= South Central Interior Distance Education School =

SCIDES

Location
- 2475 Merritt Ave. (PO Box 4700 Stn. Main) Merritt BC V1K 1B8; Merritt, British Columbia, V1K 1B8; Canada
- Coordinates: 50.1118°N 120.7788°W

Information
- School board: School District 58 Nicola-Similkameen
- Superintendent: Mr. Steve McNiven
- Principal: Ms. Karen Goetz
- Staff: 37
- Grades: K-12

SCIDES or South Central Interior Distance Education School is a distance education school which teaches elementary, middle, and high school programs online. SCIDES also provides programs for both graduated adults (upgrading) and non-graduated adults (adult graduation programs). It is an accredited public school, and as such is tuition free. SCIDES offers over 150 courses, all of which are authorized by the BC Ministry of Education and taught by BC certified teachers. SCIDES is open 12 months of the year and offers continuous enrollment. SCIDES is able to provide cross-enrollment for students in brick-and-mortar schools or full-time school program options. SCIDES headquarters is located in Merritt, British Columbia, and is part of School District 58.

== History ==
SCIDES is one of the 9 distance education schools initiated in BC in 1990, and is now one of over 50 in the province.
