= Kawkawa Lake =

Lake in British Columbia, Canada

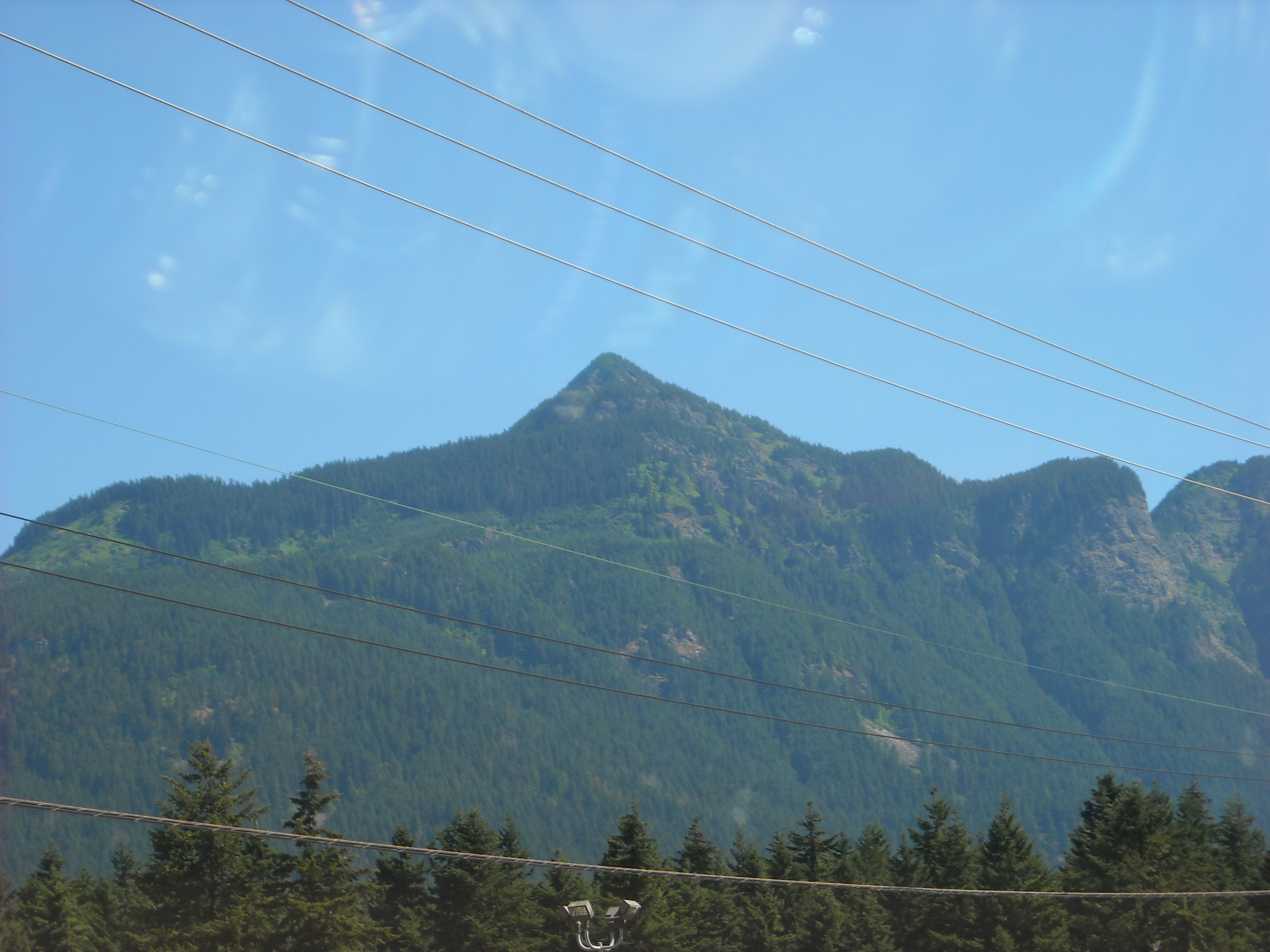
- Ogilvie Peak rising above Kawkawa Lake

- Location within British Columbia
- Location: British Columbia
- Coordinates: 49°23′N 121°24′W
- Primary outflows: Sucker Creek
- Basin countries: Canada

Kawkawa Lake is a lake located 2.5 km (1.6 mi) east of Hope, British Columbia. Kawkawa is also the name of the neighbourhood in Hope surrounding Kawkawa Lake.

The lake is home to many species of fish, but is best known for large kokanee (land-locked salmon), which can reach up to 3+ lbs in weight.

Kawkawa Lake Park on the lake has a swimming beach, a grassy play area, and amenities such.as toilets and park benches, picnic tables and a small dock with a concrete boat launch.

A privately operated resort and campground on the lake's shore was shut down in 2019. Water sports around the lake include: skiing, wake boarding, tubing, and jet skiing. Visitors can hike through the nearby Othello Tunnels.

Kawkawa Lake Indian Reserve No. 16 is located on the southeastern shore of the lake, and is administered by the Hope-area Union Bar First Nation.

== Stó:lō history ==
The name of the lake is from the Halq'eméylem word Q'áwq'ewem, meaning "home of loons", after two loons that once lived here: q'ewq'weelacha and q'ewq'ewelot. There is also another story about a young man who jumped from the rocky bluffs on the north side of the lake, plunging all the way to the bottom landing on a pit house. The dim light from the pit house was later seen deep below the water, by a woman passing by.

When a dam was built later, it adversely effected the salmon run up the Kw'ikw'iya:la (Coquihalla River).

== See also ==
- List of lakes of British Columbia
