= Princeton Aerodrome =

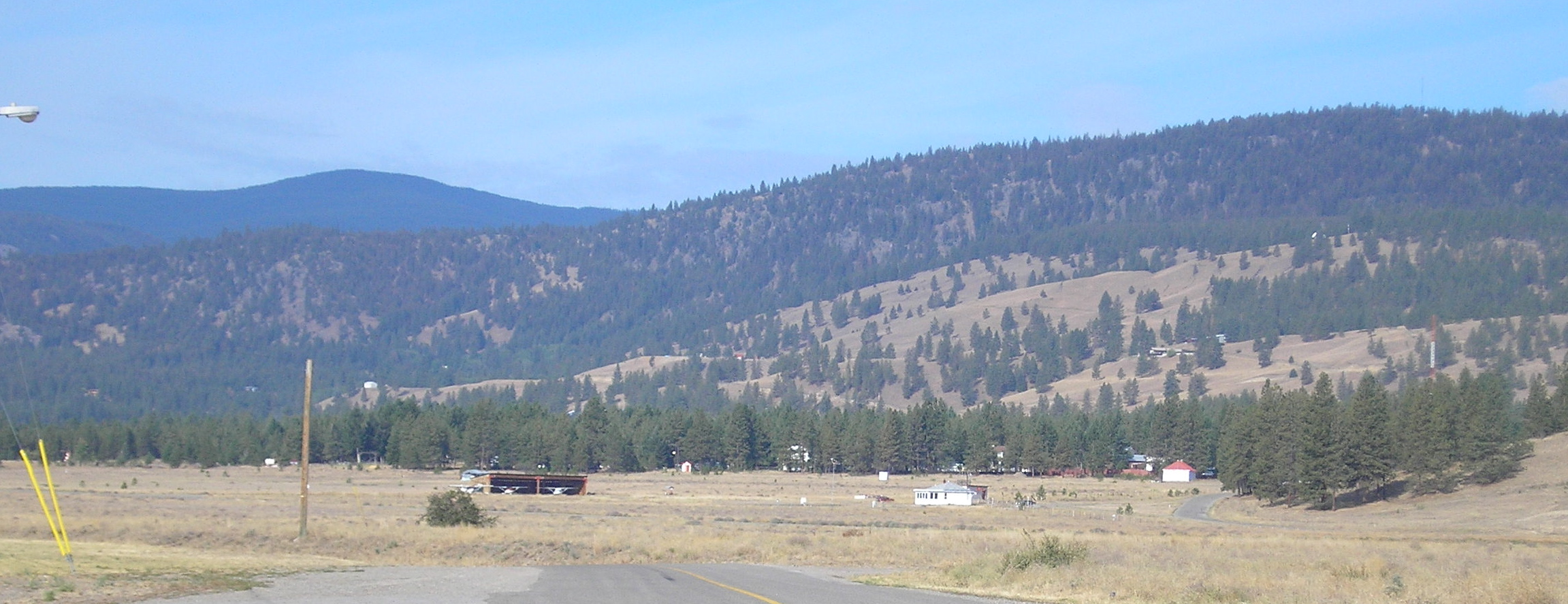
- IATA: none; ICAO: CYDC; WMO: 71886

Summary
- Airport type: Public
- Owner/Operator: Town of Princeton
- Location: Princeton, British Columbia
- Time zone: PST (UTC−08:00)
  - Summer (DST): PDT (UTC−07:00)
- Elevation AMSL: 2,302 ft / 702 m
- Coordinates: 49°28′04″N 120°30′45″W

Map
- Location in British Columbia

Runways
Direction	Length		Surface
Direction	ft	m	Surface
04/22	3,932	1,198	Asphalt
- Source: Canada Flight Supplement; Environment Canada

Princeton Aerodrome (ICAO: CYDC) is located adjacent to Princeton, British Columbia, Canada.

== History ==
In approximately 1942 the aerodrome was listed as RCAF & D of T Aerodrome - Princeton, British Columbia at 49°28′30″N 120°31′15″W with a variation of 24 degrees E and elevation of 2,310 feet (704 m). The aerodrome was listed as "under construction - serviceable" with one runways as follows:

Runway name	Length	Width	Surface
3/21	5,600 feet (1,707 m)	800 feet (244 m)	Turf

The airport was originally intended as an alternate landing area for early commercial aviation. The main (highest traffic) use of the airport was as the home of the Royal Canadian Air Cadet Regional Gliding School whose traffic peaked annually each July and August. The Gliding School moved to Chilliwack Airport after the 1991 season and then to Canadian Forces Base Comox.

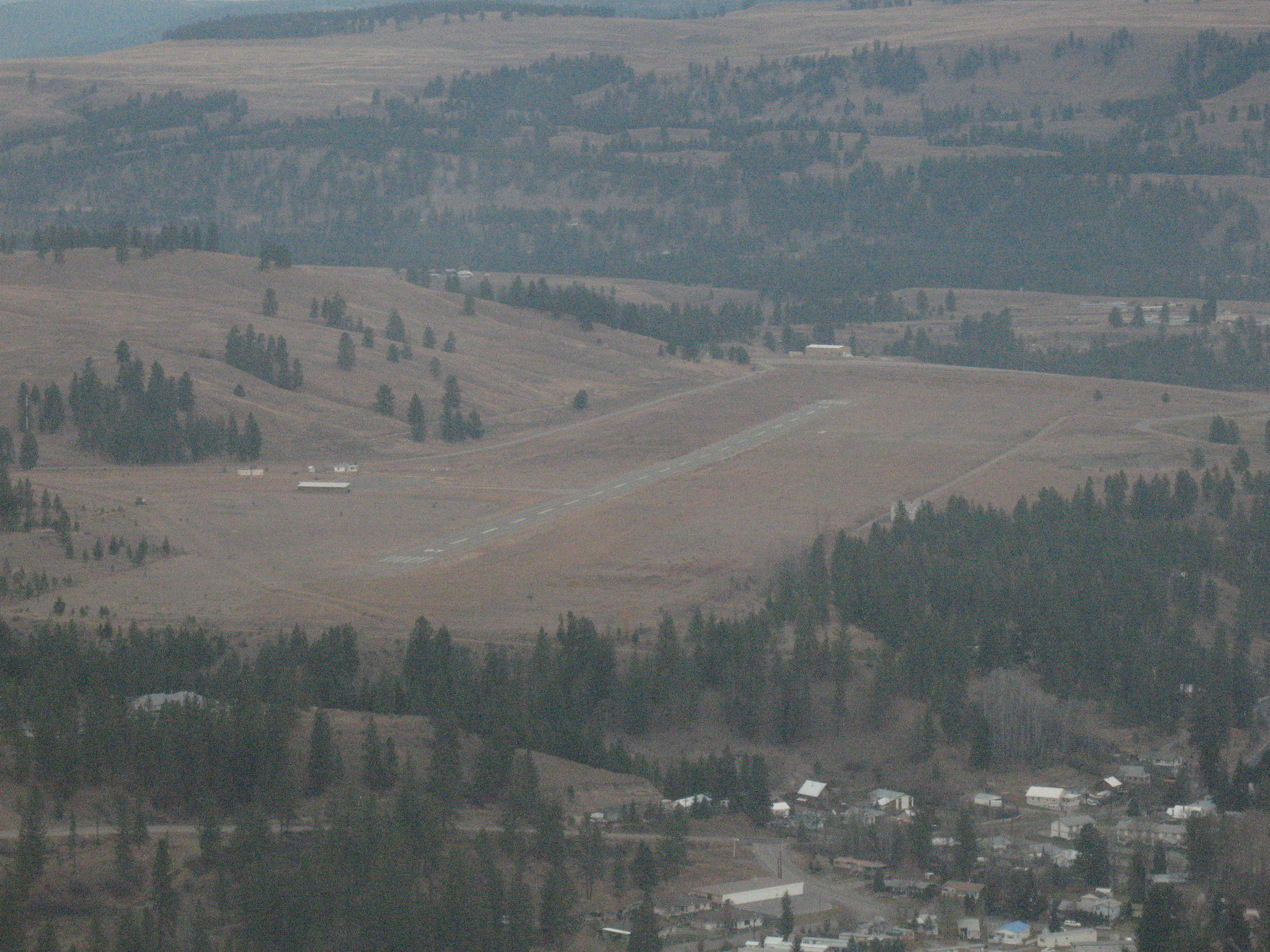
Aerial view

The airport has undergone some improvements since the early 1990s. Fuel is now available, both Jet A (22,000 litres) and 100LL (13,000 litres). All major credit cards are accepted through a self serve system. For larger turbine aircraft, a certified fuel truck which holds 7,000 litres of Jet A can be brought to the waiting aircraft.
