= John Fall Allison =

Canadian pioneer settler

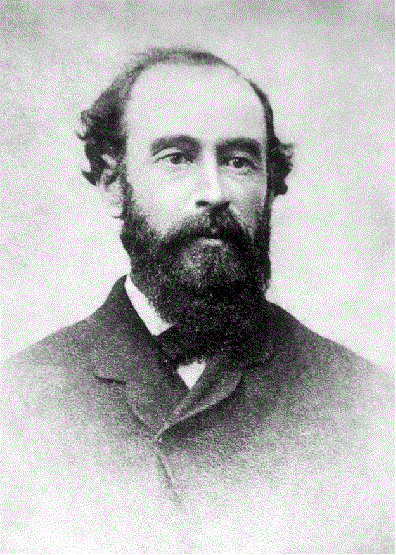
- Born: 1825; Leeds, Yorkshire, England
- Died: 28 October 1897 (aged 71–72); Princeton, British Columbia
- Occupation: Gold Commissioner

John Fall Allison (1825–1897) was a pioneer settler, Justice of the Peace, Postmaster and Gold Commissioner in the Similkameen Country of the Southern Interior of British Columbia, Canada.

== Life and career ==
Allison was born in Leeds in West Yorkshire, England in 1828. In 1837, he emigrated with his parents to the United States. In 1849, he went prospecting in California. In 1858, during the Fraser River Gold Rush, Allison travelled to the Colony of British Columbia and arrived in Vermillion Forks (now Princeton) in 1860. Allison was the first European settler in the area, where he staked gold, copper and coal claims and established the first cattle ranch.

In 1862, Allison married a First Nations woman named Nora Yakumtikum, with whom he had three children. In 1868, he married Susan Louisa Moir. Together John and Susan had fourteen children.

In 1876, Allison was appointed a Justice of the Peace and became the first Gold Commissioner of the newly created Similkameen Mining District. Allison died in 1897 and was buried at a site overlooking the Similkameen River near a landmark named "Castle Rock".

Allison Pass, through which Highway 3 runs, was named for Allison, as he was the first European explorer to discover the pass.
