= Macleod Peak =

Mountain in British Columbia, Canada

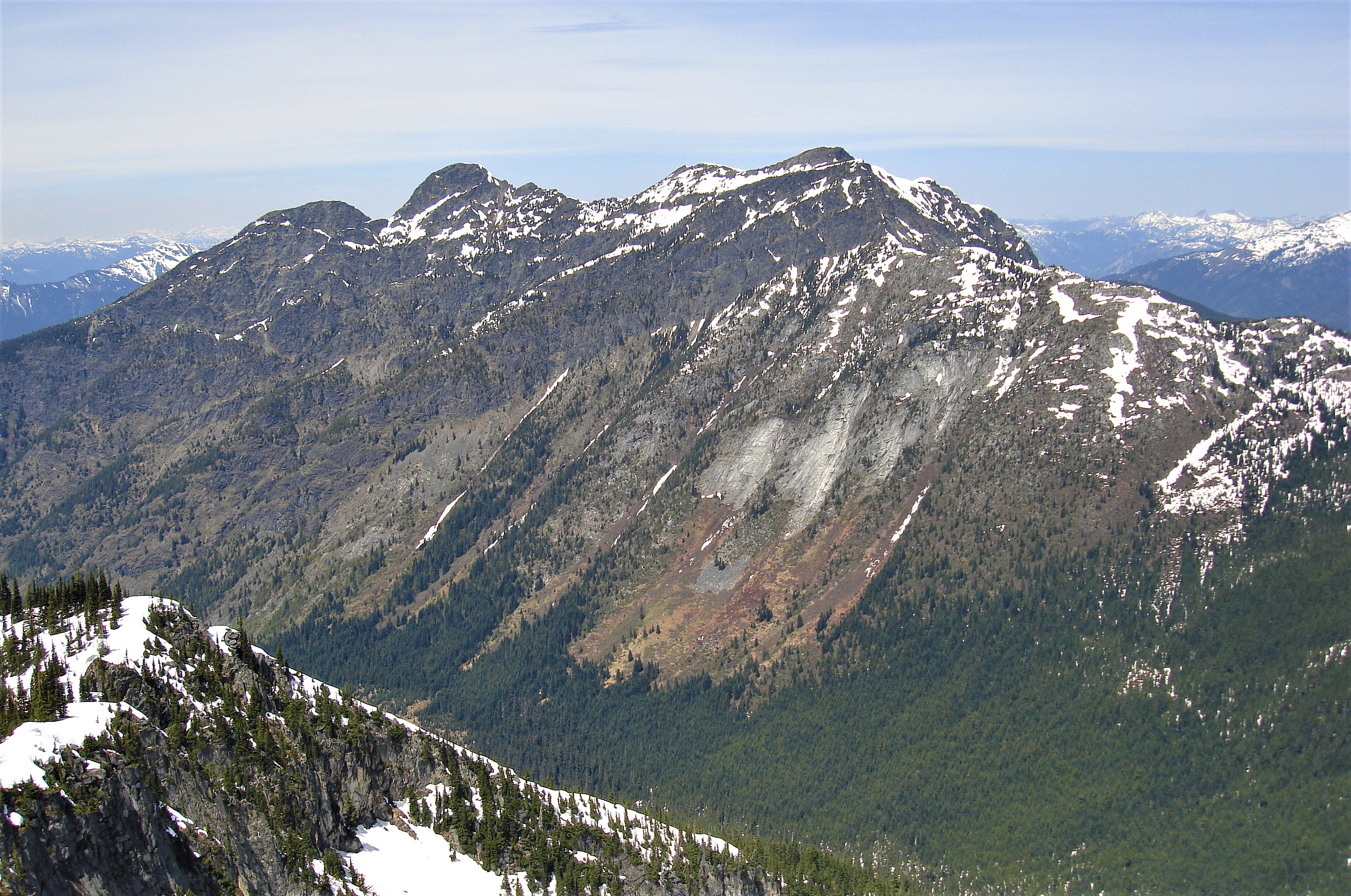
- South aspect

Highest point
- Elevation: 2,176 m (7,139 ft)
- Prominence: 420 m (1,378 ft)
- Parent peak: Mount Outram (2,461 m)
- Isolation: 2.19 km (1.36 mi)
- Listing: Mountains of British Columbia
- Coordinates: 49°19′43″N 121°12′47″W

Naming
- Etymology: Alexander Harvey Macleod

Geography
- Location within British Columbia Location within Canada
- Interactive map of Macleod Peak
- Country: Canada
- Province: British Columbia
- District: Yale Division Yale Land District
- Parent range: Hozameen Range; Canadian Cascades
- Topo map: NTS 92H6 Hope

Macleod Peak is a 2,176-metre (7,139-foot) mountain summit located in the Canadian Cascades of British Columbia, Canada.

== Description ==
Macleod Peak is the third-highest summit of Manson Ridge which is a subrange of the Hozameen Range. It is situated 17 km (11 mi) southeast of Hope and 2.2 km (1 mi) west of Mount Hatfield which is the nearest higher neighbor. Precipitation runoff from the peak drains into Eight Mile and Eleven Mile creeks which are both tributaries of the Nicolum River. Topographic relief is significant as the summit rises 1,000 metres (3,280 feet) above Eleven Mile Creek in 1.5 kilometre (0.93 mile).

The mountain's toponym was officially adopted on April 7, 1955, by the Geographical Names Board of Canada. The mountain's name honors Royal Canadian Air Force Pilot Officer Alexander Harvey Macleod, from Sardis, who was killed in WWII action during air operations over Europe on October 15, 1944, at age 22.

== Geology ==
The North Cascades features some of the most rugged topography in the Cascade Range with craggy peaks, ridges, and deep glacial valleys. Geological events occurring many years ago created the diverse topography and drastic elevation changes over the Cascade Range leading to the various climate differences. These climate differences lead to vegetation variety defining the ecoregions in this area.

The history of the formation of the Cascade Mountains dates back millions of years ago to the late Eocene Epoch. With the North American Plate overriding the Pacific Plate, episodes of volcanic igneous activity persisted. In addition, small fragments of the oceanic and continental lithosphere called terranes created the North Cascades about 50 million years ago.

During the Pleistocene period dating back over two million years ago, glaciation advancing and retreating repeatedly scoured the landscape leaving deposits of rock debris. The U-shaped cross sections of the river valleys are a result of recent glaciation. Uplift and faulting in combination with glaciation have been the dominant processes which have created the tall peaks and deep valleys of the North Cascades area.

== Climate ==
Most weather fronts originate in the Pacific Ocean, and travel east toward the Cascade Mountains. As fronts approach the North Cascades, they are forced upward by the peaks of the Cascade Range, causing them to drop their moisture in the form of rain or snowfall (orographic lift). As a result, the west side of the North Cascades experiences higher precipitation than the east side. During winter months, weather is usually cloudy, but due to high pressure systems over the Pacific Ocean that intensify during summer months, there is often little or no cloud cover during the summer. As a result, the Cascade Mountains experience high precipitation, especially during the winter months in the form of snowfall. Winter temperatures can drop below −10 °C with wind chill factors below −20 °C. The months of July through September offer the most favorable weather for viewing and climbing Macleod Peak.

== See also ==
- Geography of British Columbia
- Geography of the North Cascades
