= Mount Hatfield =

Mountain in British Columbia, Canada

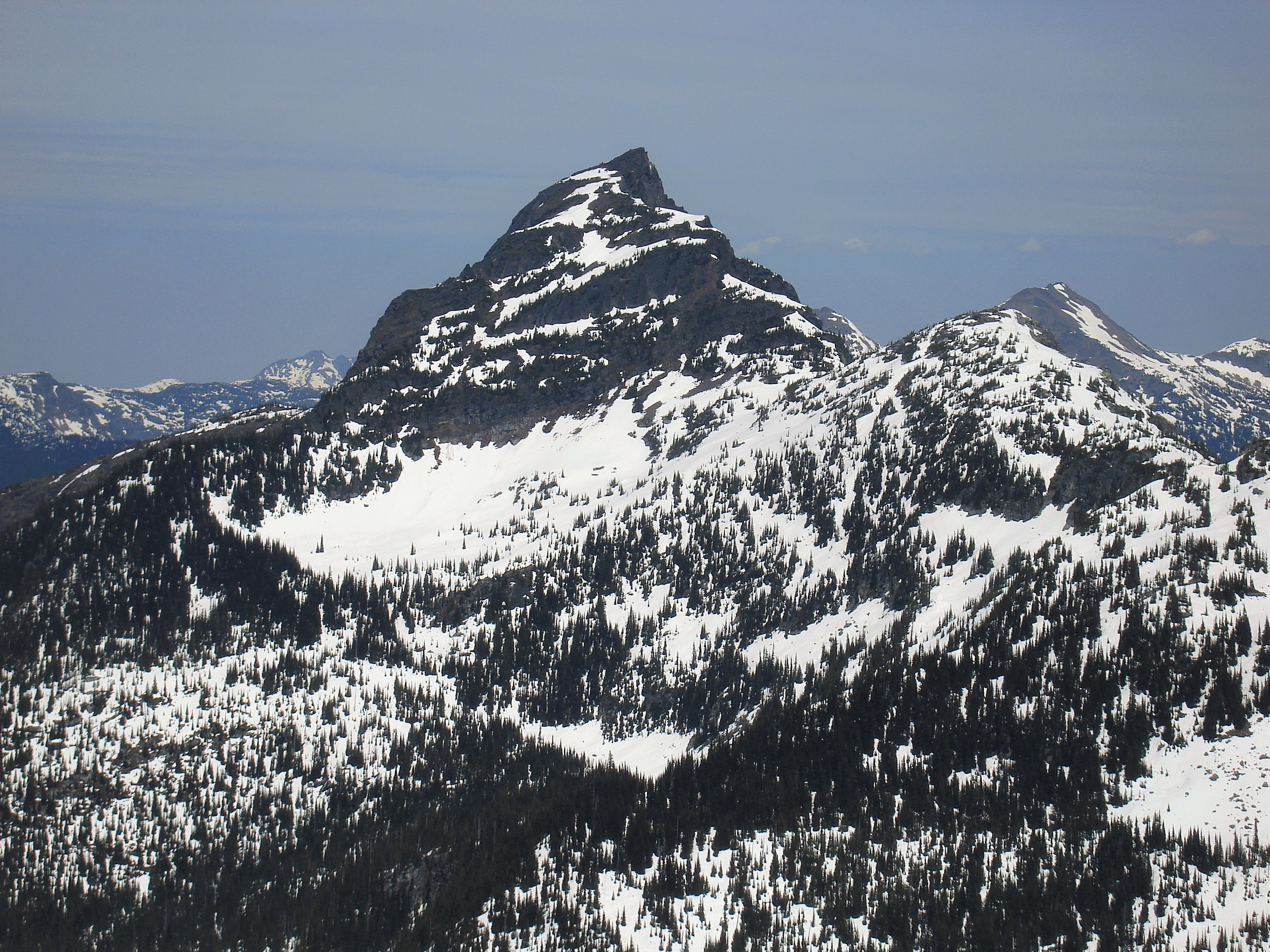
- Southwest aspect

Highest point
- Elevation: 2,227 m (7,306 ft)
- Prominence: 266 m (873 ft)
- Parent peak: Mount Outram (2,461 m)
- Isolation: 4.29 km (2.67 mi)
- Listing: Mountains of British Columbia
- Coordinates: 49°19′37″N 121°10′59″W

Naming
- Etymology: Harley Hatfield (1905–2000)

Geography
- Location within British Columbia Location within Canada
- Interactive map of Mount Hatfield
- Country: Canada
- Province: British Columbia
- District: Yale Division Yale Land District
- Parent range: Hozameen Range; Canadian Cascades
- Topo map: NTS 92H6 Hope

Climbing
- First ascent: 1956

Mount Hatfield is a 2,227-metre (7,306-foot) mountain summit located in the Canadian Cascades of British Columbia, Canada.

== Description ==
Mt. Hatfield is the second-highest summit of Manson Ridge which is a subrange of the Hozameen Range. It is situated 20 km (12 mi) southeast of Hope and 4.2 km (3 mi) north-northwest of Mount Outram which is the nearest higher neighbor. Precipitation runoff from the peak drains into tributaries of the Coquihalla and Nicolum Rivers. Topographic relief is significant as the summit rises 950 metres (3,117 feet) above Kippan Lakes in one kilometre (0.6 mile).

== History ==
The first ascent of the summit was made in 1956 by Roy Mason and Joe Hutton. The mountain's toponym was officially adopted on June 20, 1978, by the Geographical Names Board of Canada. The mountain's name was submitted by the Outdoor Recreation Council of British Columbia to honor conservationist Harley Hatfield (1905–2000) of Penticton and his father, Seaman Hatfield (1875–1964).

== Geology ==
Mount Hatfield is related to the Chilliwack batholith, which intruded the region 26 to 29 million years ago after the major orogenic episodes in the region. This is part of the Pemberton Volcanic Belt, an eroded volcanic belt that formed as a result of subduction of the Farallon Plate starting 29 million years ago.

During the Pleistocene period dating back over two million years ago, glaciation advancing and retreating repeatedly scoured the landscape. The U-shaped cross sections of the river valleys are a result of recent glaciation. Uplift and faulting in combination with glaciation have been the dominant processes which have created the tall peaks and deep valleys of the North Cascades area.

The North Cascades features some of the most rugged topography in the Cascade Range with craggy peaks and ridges, deep glacial valleys, and granite spires. Geological events occurring many years ago created the diverse topography and drastic elevation changes over the Cascade Range leading to various climate differences which lead to vegetation variety defining the ecoregions in this area.

== Climate ==
Most weather fronts originate in the Pacific Ocean, and travel east toward the Cascade Mountains. As fronts approach the North Cascades, they are forced upward by the peaks of the Cascade Range, causing them to drop their moisture in the form of rain or snowfall (orographic lift). As a result, the west side of the North Cascades experiences higher precipitation than the east side. During winter months, weather is usually cloudy, but due to high pressure systems over the Pacific Ocean that intensify during summer months, there is often little or no cloud cover during the summer. As a result, the Cascade Mountains experience high precipitation, especially during the winter months in the form of snowfall. Winter temperatures can drop below −10 °C with wind chill factors below −20 °C. The months of July through September offer the most favorable weather for viewing and climbing Mount Hatfield.

== See also ==
- Geography of British Columbia
- Geography of the North Cascades
