= Coquihalla Range =

Mountain range in British Columbia, Canada

The Coquihalla Range is an informally named mountain range in British Columbia that lies between the Coquihalla River and the Fraser Canyon. It is part of the Canadian Cascades, which are officially named the Cascade Mountains and are the northernmost part of the Cascade Range, which begins in northern California. Other subranges of the Canadian Cascades are the Skagit Range, Hozameen Range and Okanagan Range
