= Skagit Peak =

Mountain in Washington (state), United States

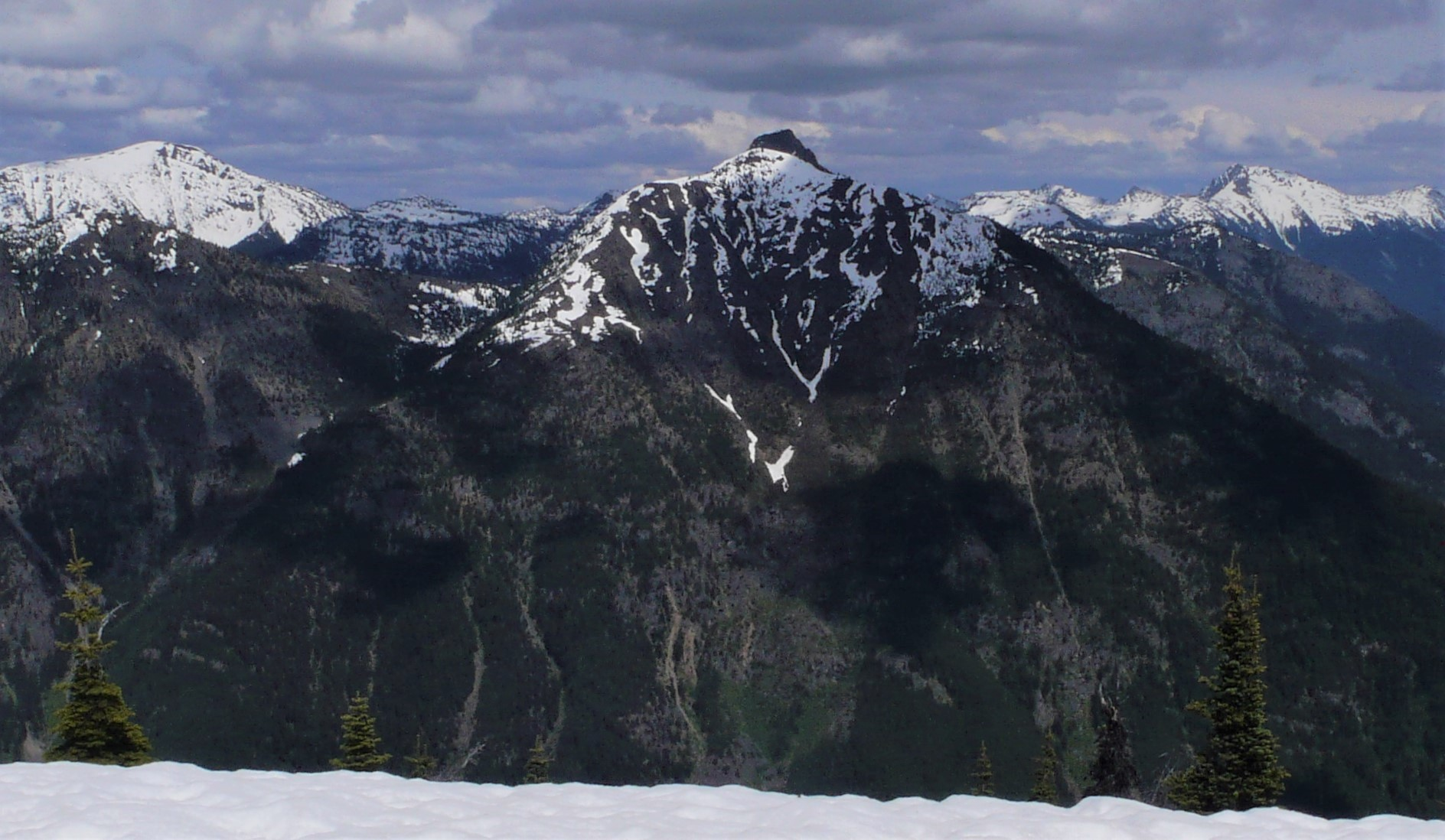
- West aspect, from Desolation Peak (Joker Mountain left, Three Fools Peak right)

Highest point
- Elevation: 6,824 ft (2,080 m)
- Prominence: 880 ft (270 m)
- Parent peak: Joker Mountain (7,603 ft)
- Isolation: 3.83 mi (6.16 km)
- Coordinates: 48°55′00″N 120°57′00″W

Geography
- Location within Washington (state) Location within the United States
- Interactive map of Skagit Peak
- Location: Whatcom County, Washington, U.S.
- Parent range: Cascade Range; North Cascades; Hozameen Range
- Topo map: USGS Skagit Peak

Climbing
- Easiest route: hiking West slope

Skagit Peak is a 6,824-foot (2,080-metre) mountain summit located in the North Cascades, in Whatcom County of Washington state. It is situated on the western side of the Cascade crest, at the western edge of the Pasayten Wilderness, on land managed by the Okanogan–Wenatchee National Forest. Skagit Peak is part of the Hozameen Range, a subset of the North Cascades which also includes Hozomeen Mountain to the north, and Jack Mountain to the south. Precipitation runoff from this mountain drains into the Skagit River via Three Fools Creek and Ross Lake.

== Geology ==
The North Cascades features some of the most rugged topography in the Cascade Range with craggy peaks, granite spires, ridges, and deep glacial valleys. Geological events occurring many years ago created the diverse topography and drastic elevation changes over the Cascade Range leading to various climate differences.

The history of the formation of the Cascade Mountains dates back millions of years ago to the late Eocene Epoch. With the North American Plate overriding the Pacific Plate, episodes of volcanic igneous activity persisted. In addition, small fragments of the oceanic and continental lithosphere called terranes created the North Cascades about 50 million years ago.

During the Pleistocene period dating back over two million years ago, glaciation advancing and retreating repeatedly scoured the landscape leaving deposits of rock debris. The U-shaped cross section of the river valleys is a result of recent glaciation. Uplift and faulting in combination with glaciation have been the dominant processes which have created the tall peaks and deep valleys of the North Cascades area.

== Climate ==
Skagit Peak is located in the marine west coast climate zone of western North America. Most weather fronts originate in the Pacific Ocean, and travel northeast toward the Cascade Mountains. As fronts approach the North Cascades, they are forced upward by the peaks of the Cascade Range, causing them to drop their moisture in the form of rain or snowfall onto the Cascades. As a result, the west side of the North Cascades experiences high precipitation, especially during the winter months in the form of snowfall. Due to its temperate climate and proximity to the Pacific Ocean, areas west of the Cascade Crest very rarely experience temperatures below 0 °F (−18 °C) or above 80 °F (27 °C). During winter months, weather is usually cloudy, but, due to high pressure systems over the Pacific Ocean that intensify during summer months, there is often little or no cloud cover during the summer. Because of maritime influence, snow tends to be wet and heavy, resulting in high avalanche danger. The months July through September offer the most favorable weather for viewing or climbing this peak.

== See also ==
- Geography of the North Cascades
- Geology of the Pacific Northwest
- Spratt Mountain
