= Spratt Mountain =

Mountain in Washington state, United States

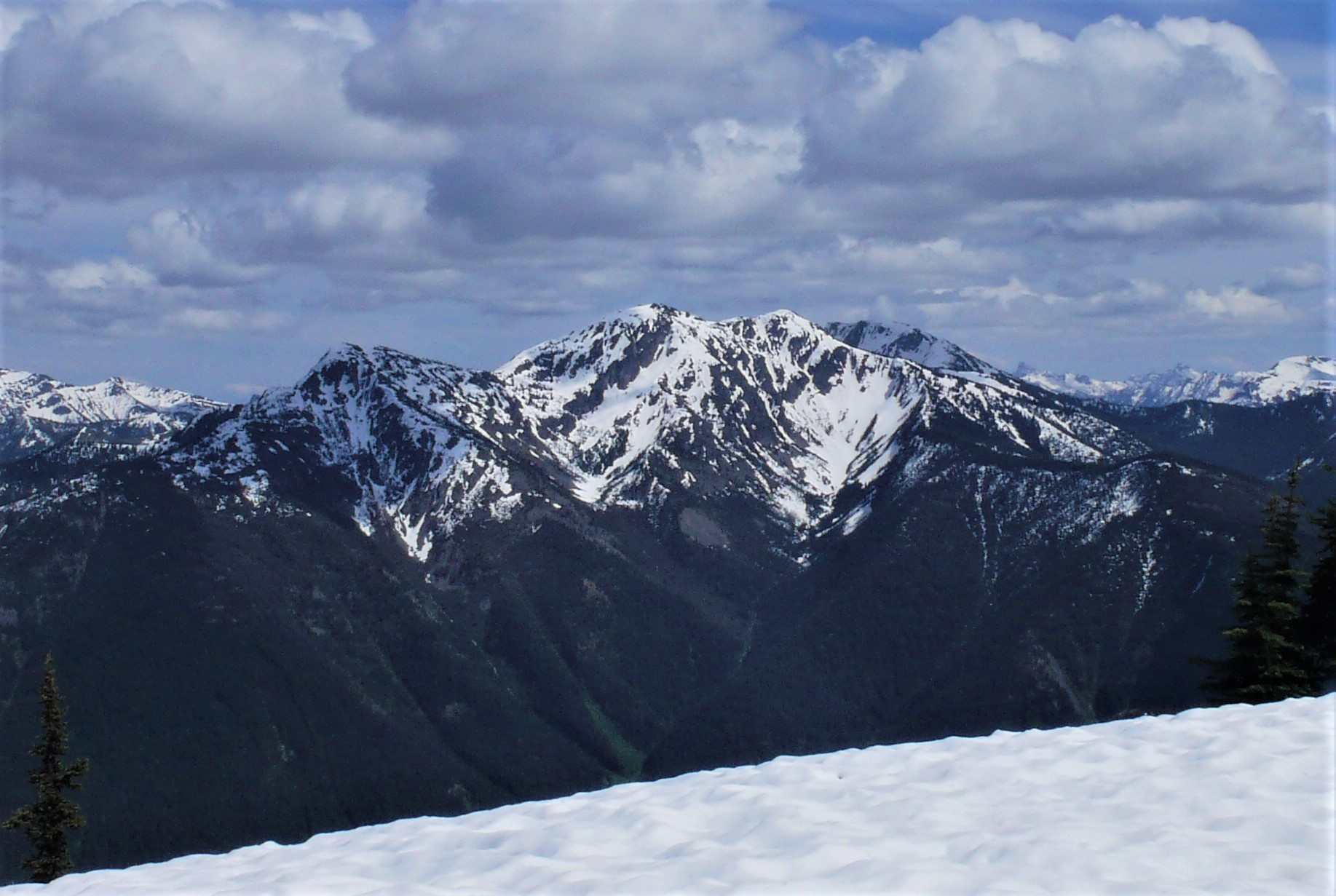
- Northwest aspect, from Desolation Peak

Highest point
- Elevation: 7,258 ft (2,212 m)
- Prominence: 778 ft (237 m)
- Parent peak: Bear Skull Mountain (7,330 ft)
- Isolation: 1.87 mi (3.01 km)
- Coordinates: 48°51′32″N 120°56′55″W

Geography
- Location within Washington (state) Location within the United States
- Interactive map of Spratt Mountain
- Location: Whatcom County, Washington, U.S.
- Parent range: Cascade Range; North Cascades; Hozameen Range
- Topo map: USGS Jack Mountain

Spratt Mountain is a 7,258-foot (2,212-metre) mountain summit located in the North Cascades, in Whatcom County of Washington state. It is situated on the western side of the Cascade crest, at the western edge of the Pasayten Wilderness, on land managed by the Okanogan–Wenatchee National Forest. Spratt Mountain is part of the Hozameen Range, a subset of the North Cascades which also includes Skagit Peak four miles to the north, and Jack Mountain six miles to the south. Precipitation runoff from this mountain drains into Ross Lake via Three Fools Creek and Dry Creek.

== Geology ==
The North Cascades features some of the most rugged topography in the Cascade Range with craggy peaks, granite spires, ridges, and deep glacial valleys. Geological events occurring many years ago created the diverse topography and drastic elevation changes over the Cascade Range leading to various climate differences.

The history of the formation of the Cascade Mountains dates back millions of years ago to the late Eocene Epoch. With the North American Plate overriding the Pacific Plate, episodes of volcanic igneous activity persisted. In addition, small fragments of the oceanic and continental lithosphere called terranes created the North Cascades about 50 million years ago.

During the Pleistocene period dating back over two million years ago, glaciation advancing and retreating repeatedly scoured the landscape leaving deposits of rock debris. The U-shaped cross section of the river valleys is a result of recent glaciation. Uplift and faulting in combination with glaciation have been the dominant processes which have created the tall peaks and deep valleys of the North Cascades area.

== Climate ==
Spratt Mountain is located in the marine west coast climate zone of western North America. Most weather fronts originate in the Pacific Ocean, and travel northeast toward the Cascade Mountains. As fronts approach the North Cascades, they are forced upward by the peaks of the Cascade Range, causing them to drop their moisture in the form of rain or snowfall onto the Cascades. As a result, the west side of the North Cascades experiences high precipitation, especially during the winter months in the form of snowfall. Due to its temperate climate and proximity to the Pacific Ocean, areas west of the Cascade Crest very rarely experience temperatures below 0 °F (−18 °C) or above 80 °F (27 °C). During winter months, weather is usually cloudy, but, due to high pressure systems over the Pacific Ocean that intensify during summer months, there is often little or no cloud cover during the summer. Because of maritime influence, snow tends to be wet and heavy, resulting in high avalanche danger. The months July through September offer the most favorable weather for viewing or climbing this peak.

== Gallery ==
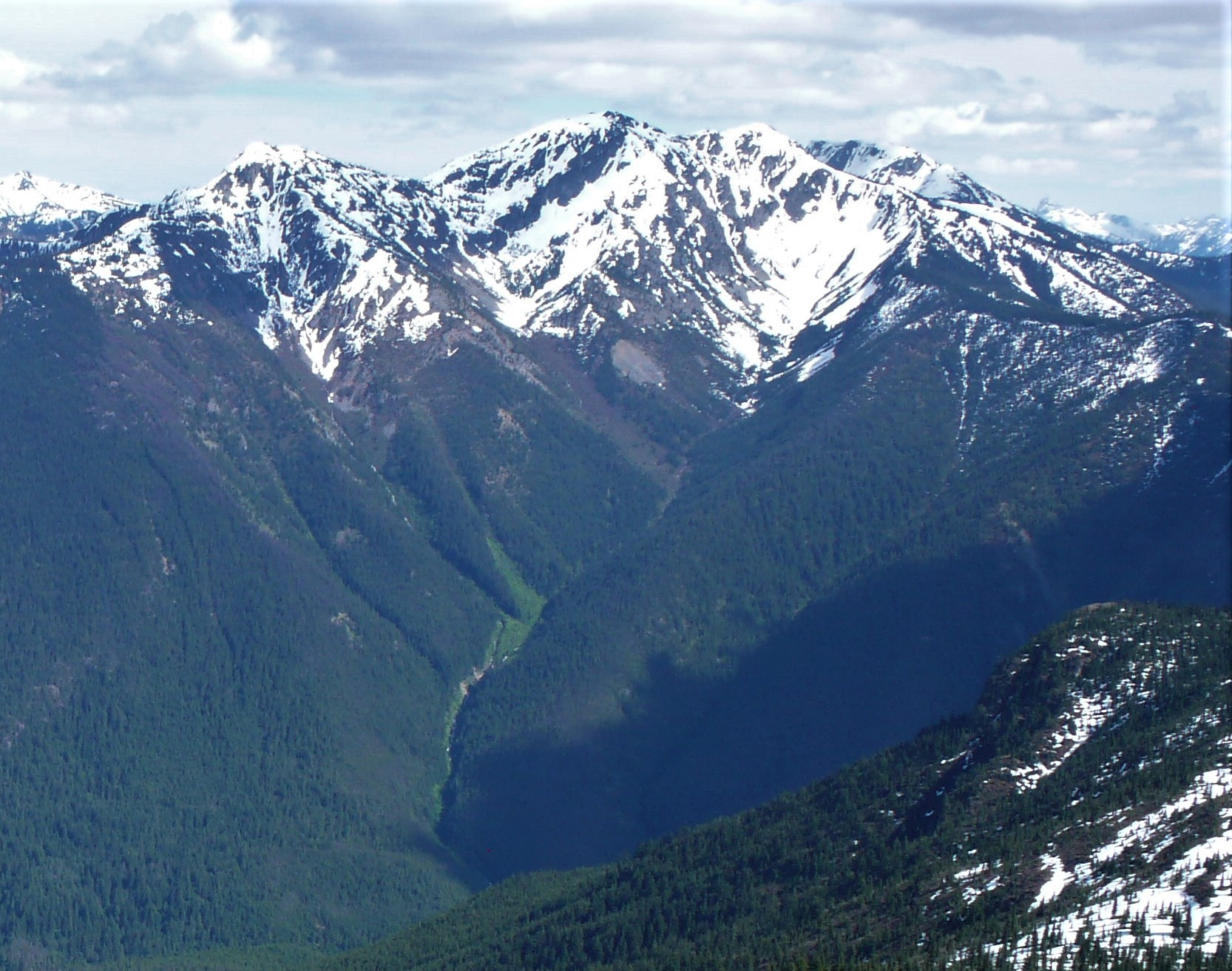
Spratt Mountain from the northwest

== See also ==
- Geography of the North Cascades
- Geology of the Pacific Northwest
