= Jackass Mountain =

Mountain in British Columbia, Canada

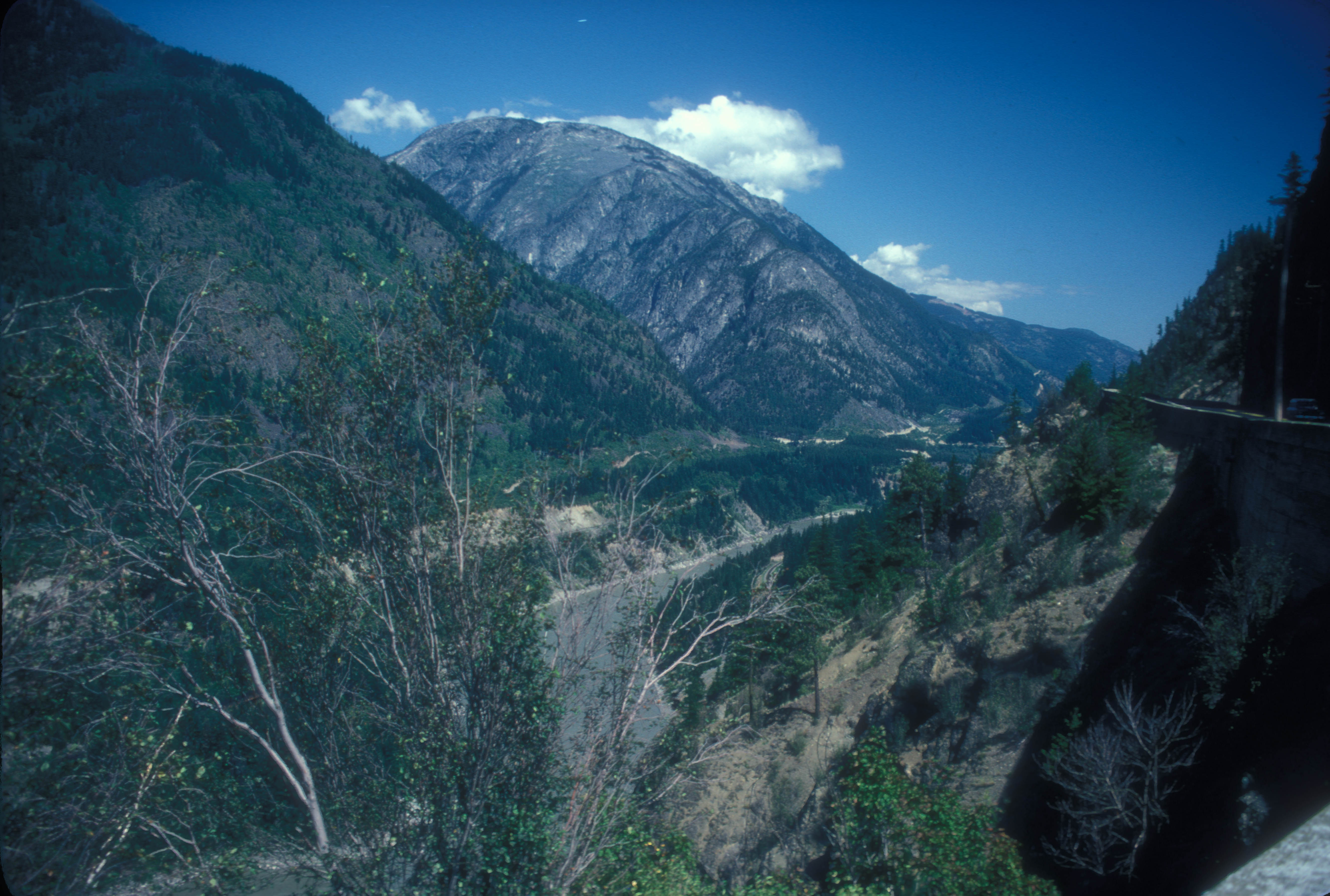

Highest point
- Elevation: 2,006 m (6,581 ft)
- Prominence: 316 m (1,037 ft)
- Parent peak: Mount Lytton (2049 m)
- Listing: Mountains of British Columbia
- Coordinates: 50°05′21″N 121°28′20″W

Geography
- Location within British Columbia
- Country: Canada
- Province: British Columbia
- District: Kamloops Division Yale Land District
- Parent range: North Cascades
- Topo map: NTS 92I3 Prospect Creek

Jackass Mountain is a mountain in the North Cascades of the Cascade Range in southwestern British Columbia, Canada, located 18 km (11 mi) southeast of Lytton and 9 km (6 mi) south of Mount Lytton. It is named for the muletrains that ventured north to the Cariboo gold fields; apparently some did not make it over the bluff and perished in a fall, hence the name.
