= Bedded Range =

Mountain range in British Columbia, Canada

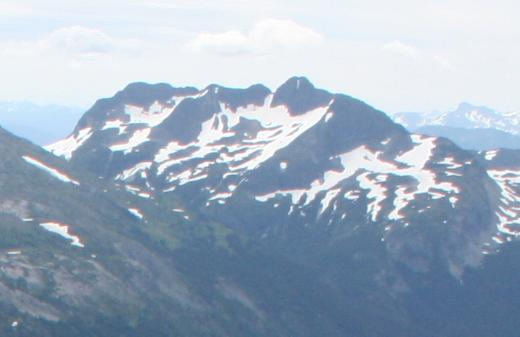
- Northern flank of Coquihalla Mountain

Highest point
- Peak: Coquihalla Mountain
- Elevation: 2,157 m (7,077 ft)
- Coordinates: 49°31′30″N 121°03′36″W

Dimensions
- Area: 369 km^{2} (142 mi^{2})

Geography
- Country: Canada
- Province: British Columbia
- Parent range: Hozameen Range
- Topo map(s): NTS 92H10 Tulameen; NTS 92H11 Spuzzum; NTS 92H6 Hope; NTS 92H7 Princeton

The Bedded Range is a mountain range in the Hozameen Range subdivision of the Canadian Cascades, which are the extension of the Cascade Range into British Columbia, Canada. Located between the Coquihalla and Tulameen Rivers, the Bedded Range is a dioritic plug related to the Chilliwack batholith.

== Ecology ==
A diverse flora and fauna exist in the Bedded Range. Fauna include mammals, amphibians and birds. In the case of amphibians, one of the species present is the Rough-skinned newt, Taricha granulosa, whose populations exhibit an adult perennibranchiate form in approximately 90 percent of the population.
