= Mount Outram (British Columbia) =

Mountain in the country of Canada

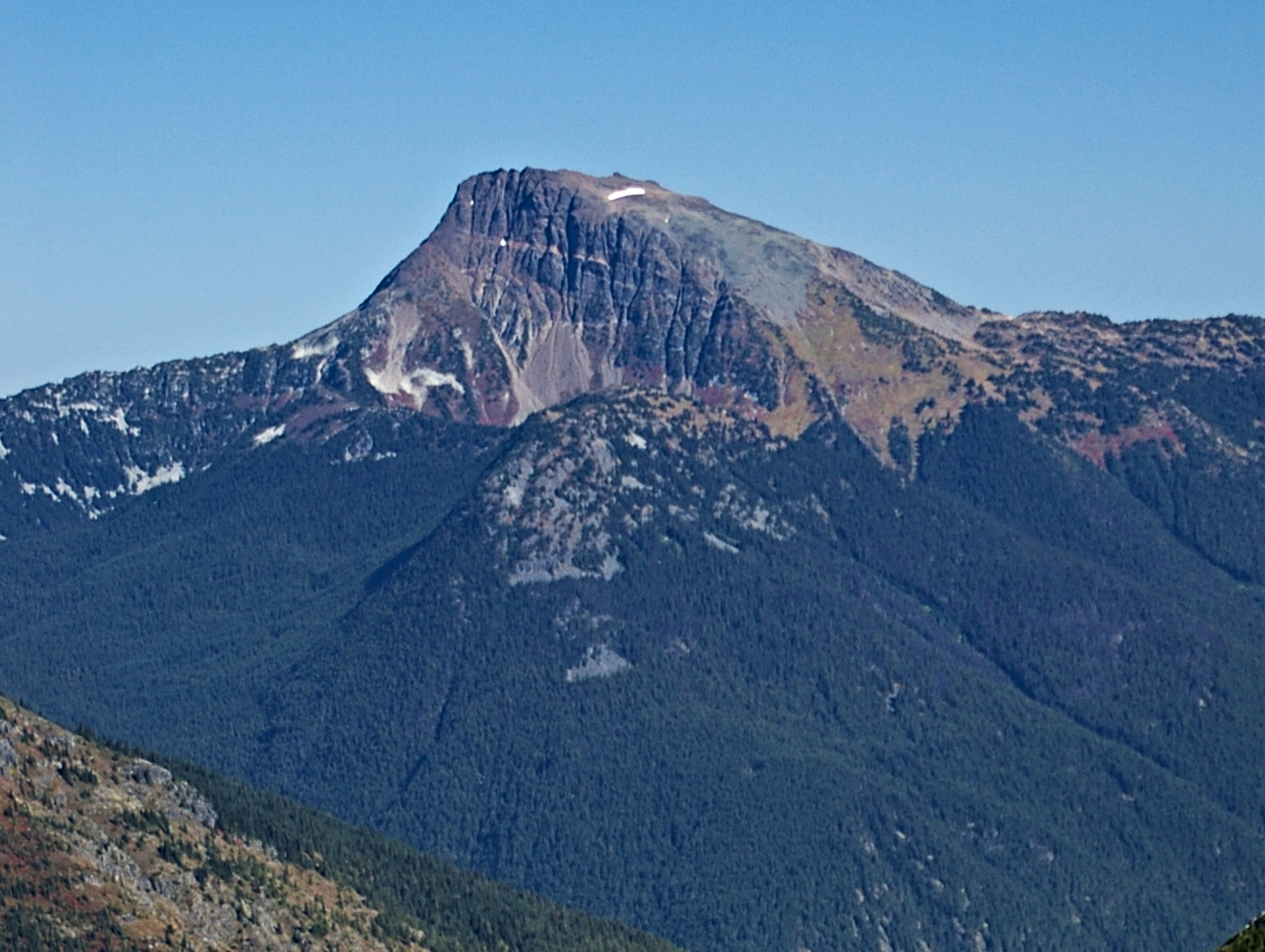
- Mt. Outram, west aspect, from Eaton Peak

Highest point
- Elevation: 2,461 m (8,074 ft)
- Prominence: 1,121 m (3,678 ft)
- Parent peak: Castle Peak
- Listing: Mountains of British Columbia
- Coordinates: 49°17′23″N 121°09′30″W

Geography
- Location within British Columbia Location within Canada
- Interactive map of Mount Outram
- Location: British Columbia, Canada
- District: Yale Division Yale Land District
- Parent range: Hozameen Range; Canadian Cascades
- Topo map: NTS 92H6 Hope

Geology
- Mountain type: Intrusive

Climbing
- First ascent: 1924 F. Perry, H. Selwood, L. Ford, T. Thacker
- Easiest route: Scramble

Mount Outram is a prominent 2,461-metre (8,074-foot) mountain summit located in the Canadian Cascades of southwestern British Columbia, Canada. It is the fourth-highest summit in the Hozameen Range, and highest point of the Manson Ridge subrange. It is situated 23 km (14 mi) southeast of Hope, and 14.5 km (9 mi) north-northeast of Silvertip Mountain, its nearest higher peak. Precipitation runoff from the peak drains into tributaries of the Coquihalla and Skagit Rivers. The mountain was known as Beaver Mountain as early as 1930 before being named for Sir James Outram, 1st Baronet, and being officially adopted October 6, 1936, by the Geographical Names Board of Canada. The first ascent of the mountain was made August 12, 1924, by Fred Perry, Herbert Selwood, Leslie Ford, and T.L. Thacker.

== Geology ==
Mount Outram is related to the Chilliwack batholith, which intruded the region 26 to 29 million years ago after the major orogenic episodes in the region. This is part of the Pemberton Volcanic Belt, an eroded volcanic belt that formed as a result of subduction of the Farallon Plate starting 29 million years ago.

During the Pleistocene period dating back over two million years ago, glaciation advancing and retreating repeatedly scoured the landscape. The U-shaped cross section of the river valleys is a result of recent glaciation. Uplift and faulting in combination with glaciation have been the dominant processes which have created the tall peaks and deep valleys of the North Cascades area.

The North Cascades features some of the most rugged topography in the Cascade Range with craggy peaks and ridges, deep glacial valleys, and granite spires. Geological events occurring many years ago created the diverse topography and drastic elevation changes over the Cascade Range leading to various climate differences which lead to vegetation variety defining the ecoregions in this area. Fred Beckey describes Mount Outram as having "the finest assortment of arctic flora in the northern Cascades."

== Climate ==
Most weather fronts originate in the Pacific Ocean, and travel east toward the Cascade Mountains. As fronts approach the North Cascades, they are forced upward by the peaks of the Cascade Range, causing them to drop their moisture in the form of rain or snowfall onto the Cascades (orographic lift). As a result, the west side of the North Cascades experiences higher precipitation than the east side, especially during the winter months in the form of snowfall. During winter months, weather is usually cloudy, but due to high pressure systems over the Pacific Ocean that intensify during summer months, there is often little or no cloud cover during the summer. As a result, the Cascade Mountains experience high precipitation, especially during the winter months in the form of snowfall. Temperatures can drop below −20 °C with wind chill factors below −30 °C. The months July through September offer the most favorable weather for climbing Mount Outram.

== Climbing Routes ==
Established climbing routes on Mount Outram:

- South slopes - hiking
- Northeast Ridge - class 5 First ascent 1954
- Northwest Ridge - class 3

== See also ==
- Geography of the North Cascades
