= Jim Kelly Peak =

Volcano in the country of Canada

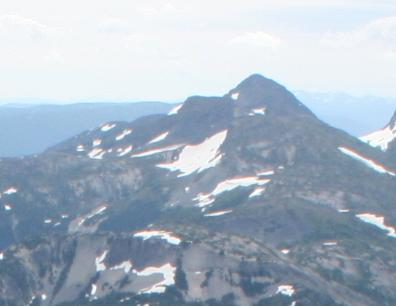
- Northern flank of Jim Kelly Peak

Highest point
- Elevation: 2,107 m (6,913 ft)
- Prominence: 237 m (778 ft)
- Listing: List of volcanoes in Canada List of Cascade volcanoes
- Coordinates: 49°40′41″N 121°02′28.99″W

Geography
- Location within British Columbia
- Location: British Columbia, Canada
- District: Yale Division Yale Land District
- Parent range: Bedded Range
- Topo map: NTS 92H11 Spuzzum

Geology
- Mountain type: Lava dome
- Volcanic arc: Canadian Cascade Arc
- Volcanic belt: Pemberton Volcanic Belt

Jim Kelly Peak, also called Jim Kelly Mountain and Mount Jim Kelly, is the unofficial name conferred by bivouac.com for a mountain in southwestern British Columbia, Canada, located 11 km (6.8 mi) south of Falls Lake and 20 km (12 mi) west of Tulameen. It lies in the Bedded Range of the northern Canadian Cascades.

The mountain is a lava dome composed of andesite only 1 km (0.62 mi) away from the eastern flank of Coquihalla Mountain, a larger but more rugged volcano. These two volcanoes form part of the deeply eroded Pemberton Volcanic Belt, which forms the oldest part of the Canadian Cascade Arc.
