= Nicolum River Provincial Park =

Provincial park

- IUCN category II (national park)
- Location within British Columbia Location within Fraser Valley Regional District
- Interactive map of Nicolum River Provincial Park
- Location: British Columbia, Canada
- Nearest town: Hope
- Coordinates: 49°21′47″N 121°20′38″W
- Area: 24.0 ha (59 acres)
- Established: March 16, 1956
- Governing body: BC Parks
- Website: Nicolum Provincial Park

Nicolum River Provincial Park, formerly Nicolum Provincial Park, is a provincial park in British Columbia, Canada, located at the confluence of the Nicolum and Coquihalla Rivers near the town of Hope. The park is a Class A, category 6 Provincial Park.

== History ==
Prior to the establishment of the park, it was explored in 1846 by Alexander Caulfield Anderson of the Hudson's Bay Company. Later on, the Dewdney Trail passed just beyond the current boundary of the park. The 24-hectare Nicolum River Provincial Park was established on March 16, 1956 as a rest stop along the recently opened Highway 3, and was developed into a campground with 9 campsites. Vehicular access to the provincial park and campground was ended in the 2000s. The park is still open to the public, but camping is forbidden. The day use parking lot has been closed.

== Facilities ==
BC Parks no longer maintains Nicolum River Provincial Park, and therefore no facilities are open for public use at the park. All washrooms are closed and removed. Parking is available outside the main gate along Highway 3.
