= Coquihalla Mountain =

Extinct stratovolcano in British Columbia, Canada

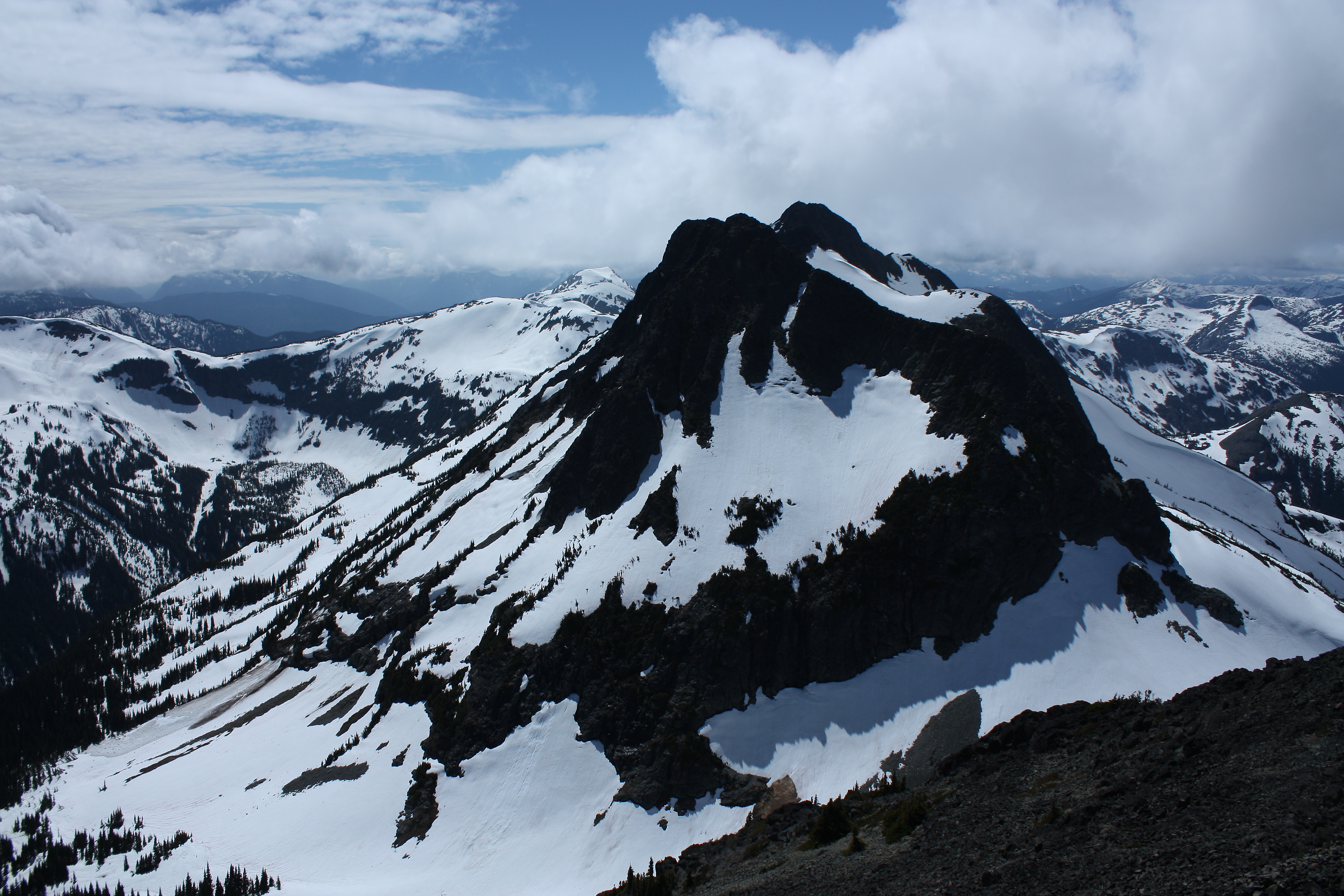
- Eastern flank of Coquihalla Mountain

Highest point
- Elevation: 2,157 m (7,077 ft)
- Prominence: 816 m (2,677 ft)
- Listing: List of volcanoes in Canada List of Cascade volcanoes
- Coordinates: 49°31′30.0″N 121°03′36.0″W

Geography
- Location within British Columbia
- Interactive map of Coquihalla Mountain
- Location: British Columbia, Canada
- District: Yale Division Yale Land District
- Parent range: Bedded Range
- Topo map: NTS 92H11 Spuzzum

Geology
- Rock age: 22 million years
- Mountain type: Stratovolcano
- Volcanic arc: Canadian Cascade Arc
- Volcanic belt: Pemberton Volcanic Belt
- Last eruption: 21 million years

Coquihalla Mountain is an extinct stratovolcano in Similkameen Country, southwestern British Columbia, Canada, located 10 km (6.2 mi) south of Falls Lake and 22 km (14 mi) west of Tulameen between the Coquihalla and Tulameen rivers. With a topographic prominence of 816 m (2,677 ft), it towers above adjacent mountain ridges. It is the highest mountain in the Bedded Range of the northern Canadian Cascades with an elevation of 2,157 m (7,077 ft) and lies near the physiographic boundaries with the Coast Mountains on the west and the Interior Plateau on the east.

== Geology ==
Coquihalla Mountain is a major preserved feature in the Miocene age Pemberton Volcanic Belt that was erupting about 21 to 22 million years ago. Like the Pemberton Volcanic Belt, Coquihalla Mountain formed as result of Cascadia subduction.

== See also ==
- Jim Kelly Peak
- Volcanism of Canada
- Volcanism of Western Canada
- List of volcanoes in Canada
- Garibaldi Volcanic Belt
