= Lytton Mountain =

Mountain in British Columbia, Canada

Coordinates: 50°09′54″N 121°26′17″W

Lytton Mountain, officially gazetted as Mount Lytton, 2049 m (6722 ft), prominence 764 m, is the northernmost summit of the Cascade Mountains in British Columbia, Canada (the range is known as the Cascade Range in the United States). It is located just southeast of the town of the same name, which is located at the confluence of the Fraser and Thompson Rivers.

The mountain was officially named Lytton Mountain originally but this was changed in 1930, although the older usage persists as the most common name for the mountain today.
