= Nicolum River =

- Mouth of Nicolum River

Location
- Country: Canada
- Province: British Columbia
- Land District: Yale Division Yale

Physical characteristics
- Mouth: Coquihalla River
  - location: near Hope, British Columbia
  - coordinates: 49°22′00″N 121°21′45″W

The Nicolum River, formerly Nicolum Creek, is a tributary of the Coquihalla River, rising in the Cascade Mountains and flowing northwest to join that stream near the town of Hope, British Columbia, Canada. Nicolum River Provincial Park is located at the confluence of the two rivers.

In 1942, the official name of the stream was changed to Nicolum Creek on the recommendation of the Dominion Topographic Survey to reflect its relative size. The official name was changed back to Nicolum River in 1991 based on local nomenclature. The name appears as "Nkalaoum River" on John Arrowsmith's 1862 map and as "Nicolume River" on Joseph Trutch's 1871 map.

In 1965, Outram Lake, a small lake in the river, was buried by the Hope Slide, and the river's course altered.

== See also ==
- List of rivers of British Columbia
