= Coquihalla River =

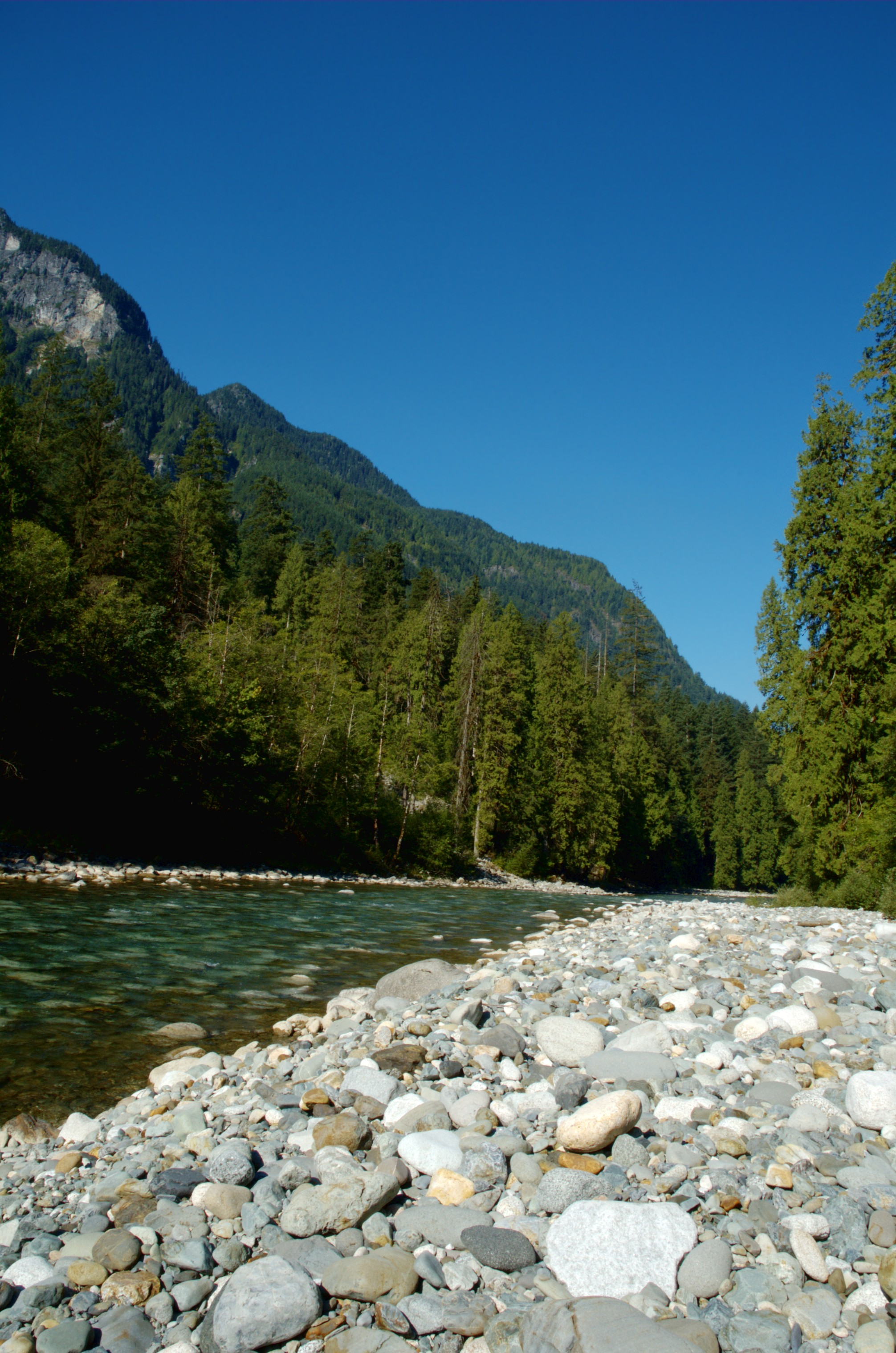
- The Coquihalla River, just outside Hope, British Columbia

Location
- Country: Canada
- Province: British Columbia
- District: Yale Division Yale Land District

Physical characteristics
- Mouth: Fraser River
  - location: Hope, Cascade Mountains
  - coordinates: 49°23′36″N 121°26′21″W
  - elevation: 38 m (125 ft)
- Discharge
  - location: near Hope
  - average: 29.8 m^{3}/s (1,050 cu ft/s)
  - minimum: 3.00 m^{3}/s (106 cu ft/s)
  - maximum: 650 m^{3}/s (23,000 cu ft/s)

Basin features
- Tributaries
  - left: Nicolum River

The Coquihalla River (originally locally /ˌkɒkɪˈhælə/ or more recently and popularly /ˌkoʊkɪˈhælə/) is a tributary of the Fraser River in the Cascade Mountains of the Canadian province of British Columbia. It originates in the Coquihalla Lakes and empties into the Fraser River at Hope.

The Coquihalla River forms the northern boundary of two portions of the Cascades, the Skagit Range and the Hozameen Range. The river flows through a deep, narrow valley, dropping 3,400 feet (1,000 m) in 33 miles (53 km), a tumultuous course that creates an incessant roar.

Kw'ikw'iyá:la in the Halkomelem language of the Stó:lō, is a place name meaning "stingy container" or "stingy place". It refers specifically to a deep pool named Skw'éxweq or Skw'exwáq, near the mouth of what is now known as the Coquihalla River. The Stó:lō would go to this pool to spear suckerfish, which were plentiful there. According to Stó:lō oral history, the s'ó:lmexw (black-haired, 2-foot tall, dark-skinned underwater people) would grab the spears, preventing fish from being caught. Thus they were stingy with the fish. There were two other pools in the rivers where this was said to happen.

The Coquihalla Highway, which runs from Hope to Kamloops, derives its name from running alongside this river between Hope and the site of a former toll booth about 50 kilometres (31 mi) away. Portions of the motion picture First Blood were filmed there.

== See also ==
- List of rivers of British Columbia
- List of tributaries of the Fraser River
