= Hozameen Range =

Mountain range in North America

- Hozomeen Range
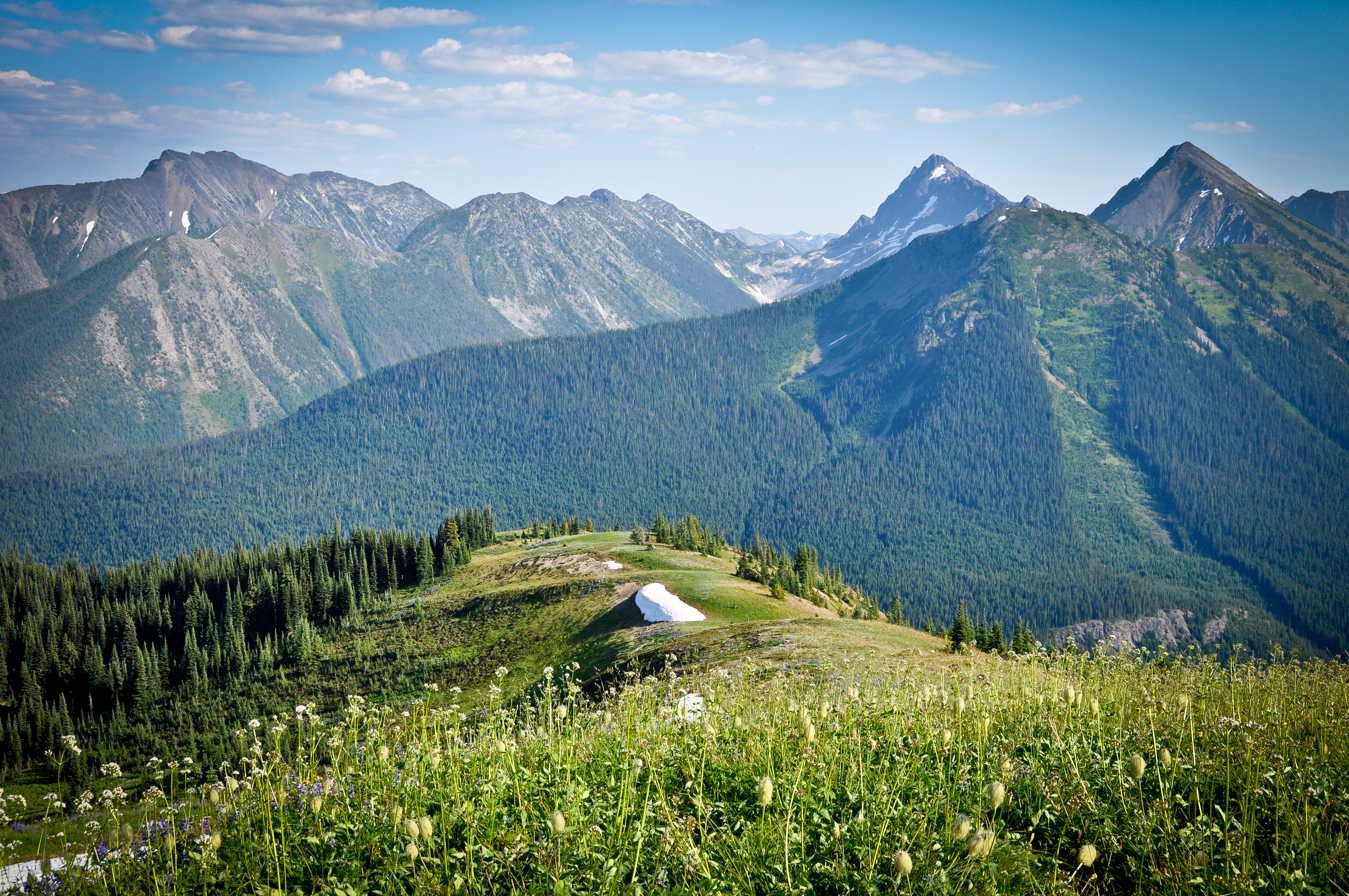
- Hozameen Range from Snow Camp Mountain in E.C. Manning Provincial Park

Highest point
- Peak: Jack Mountain
- Elevation: 2,763 m (9,065 ft)
- Coordinates: 48°46′22″N 120°57′23″W

Geography
- Location within British Columbia Location within Washington (state)
- Countries: Canada and United States
- States/Provinces: British Columbia and Washington
- Range coordinates: 49°15′N 121°00′W
- Parent range: North Cascades

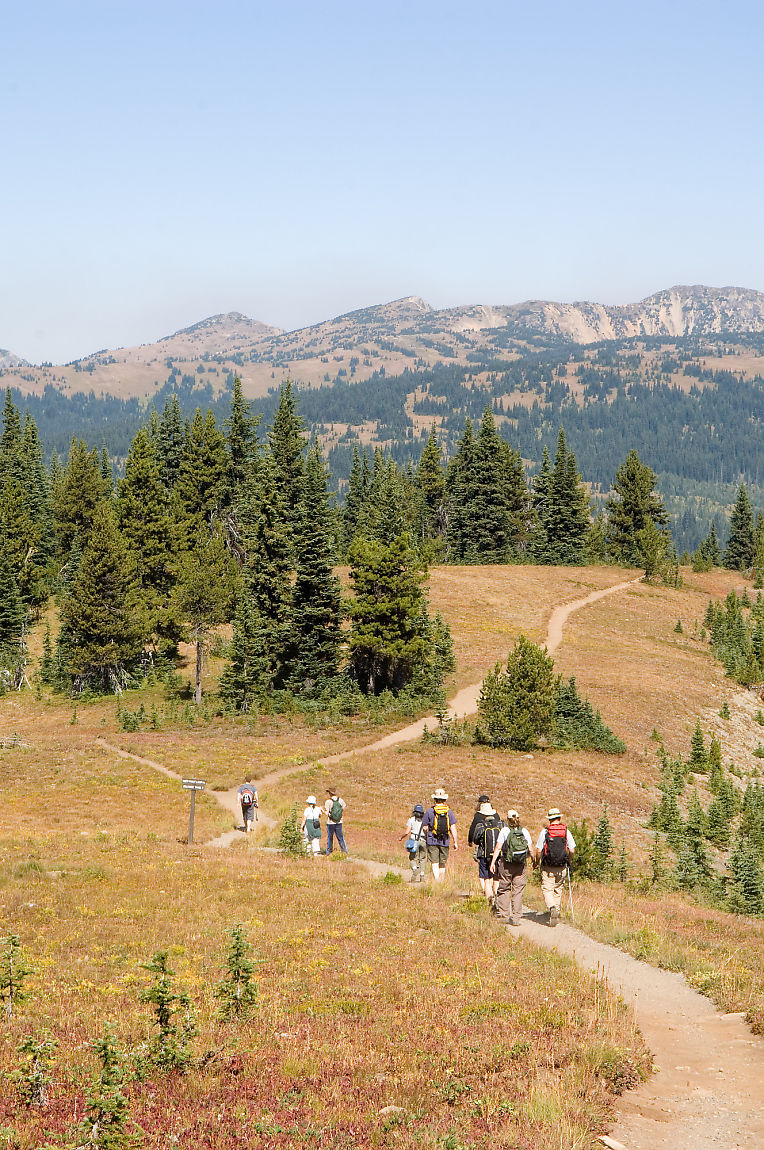
A group of hikers in E.C. Manning Provincial Park.

The Hozameen Range (spelled Hozomeen Range in the United States) is a mountain range in southwestern British Columbia and northern Washington, straddling the division between the Coast and Interior regions of that province. It is a subrange of the North Cascades and is neighboured on the east by the Okanagan Range and on the northwest by the unofficially-named Coquihalla Range, which lies between that river and the Fraser. In the northwest part of the range is the one named subrange, the Bedded Range.

There are differences of opinion about the location and boundaries of the subranges of the northern Cascades, although early geologists and topographers had a fundamental agreement on the topic. The Hozomeen Range was seen as bounded by the Skagit River on the west and extending east to the Pasayten River (east of the Sumallo River) and Coquihalla River. The core of the Hozomeen Range under this definition marks the divide between streams in British Columbia that flow west to the Fraser River and those that flow via longer routes via the Nicola River, Thompson River, and Similkameen River tributaries into the Fraser or Okanagan River. This early nomenclature defined the Hozomeen Range as extending south of the US border and including the peaks of the Hozomeen Mountain area.

BCGNIS defines the range as extending south from the Coquihalla River and west of the Tulameen River and Pasayten River, and bounded to the west by the Skagit Range.

Peakbagger.com defines the Hozameen Range as bounded on the west by the Skagit River, the Coquihalla River to the northwest, the Tulameen River to the northeast, and the Similkameen River to the east.

== Parks ==
- E.C. Manning Provincial Park is wholly within the boundaries of the Hozameen Range.
