= Anaconda, British Columbia =

Anaconda
- Location of Anaconda in British Columbia
- Coordinates: 49°05′00″N 118°41′00″W
- Country: Canada
- Province: British Columbia
- Region: Boundary Country
- Regional District: Kootenay Boundary
- Area codes: 250, 778, 236, & 672
- Highway: Highway 3

Anaconda is an unincorporated community south of the confluence of Eholt and Boundary creeks in the Boundary Country region of south central British Columbia. About 43 kilometres (27 mi) west of Grand Forks, and 82 kilometres (51 mi) east of Osoyoos, on Highway 3, the neighbourhood is immediately south of Greenwood.

== Early community ==
The name came from a local mine, which was called after the smelters and associated company near Butte, Montana. In 1896, Anaconda (like Greenwood) was booming, and the townsite was laid out. The Canadian Pacific Railway (CP) extension of the Columbia and Western Railway arrived in 1899.

By 1901, a post office, four hotels, two general stores, a bakery, shoemaker, assay office, sawmill, lawyer, and newspaper existed. The Anaconda News operated 1900–1908. Assumedly, the Anaconda Standard folded in the late 1890s. Greenwood outgrew Anaconda, but the many overtures to amalgamate never eventuated.

== Smelter ==
The BC Copper Company smelter operated 1901–1918, when falling copper prices forced its closure. Initial capacity enabled an average of 360 tons to be processed daily. In 1902, an additional furnace increased daily capacity to 700–800 tons, mainly sourced from the Mother Lode Mine. Built in 1903, the 36.9-metre (121 ft) chimney still stands. Added the next year, the Bessemerizing plant produced the much purer blister copper. Extensions increased daily capacity to 1,700 tons in 1907, and 2,200 tons in 1910. The CP line delivered ore and coke, and shipped out the processed copper. An electric railway took molten slag to a huge dump, and moved inputs and outputs within the plant.

== Electricity substation ==
The Bonnington Falls hydro generating station supplied electricity. The 1905 substation (northern edge of the residential area) that provided electricity to the smelter, became part of West Kootenay Power, operating until replaced in the 1980s. Plans to repurpose the building as an interpretive centre and alternate power project have been in limbo for many years. The public are welcome to wander across the adjacent slag pile, called Lotzkar Park, accessible from side roads west of Greenwood.

== Present community ==
Anaconda is primarily a residential neighbourhood, with substantial vacant land that is a ghost town of its vibrant past.

== See also ==
- Phoenix, British Columbia
- Eholt, British Columbia
- Anaconda (disambiguation)
