= Boundary Falls (British Columbia) =

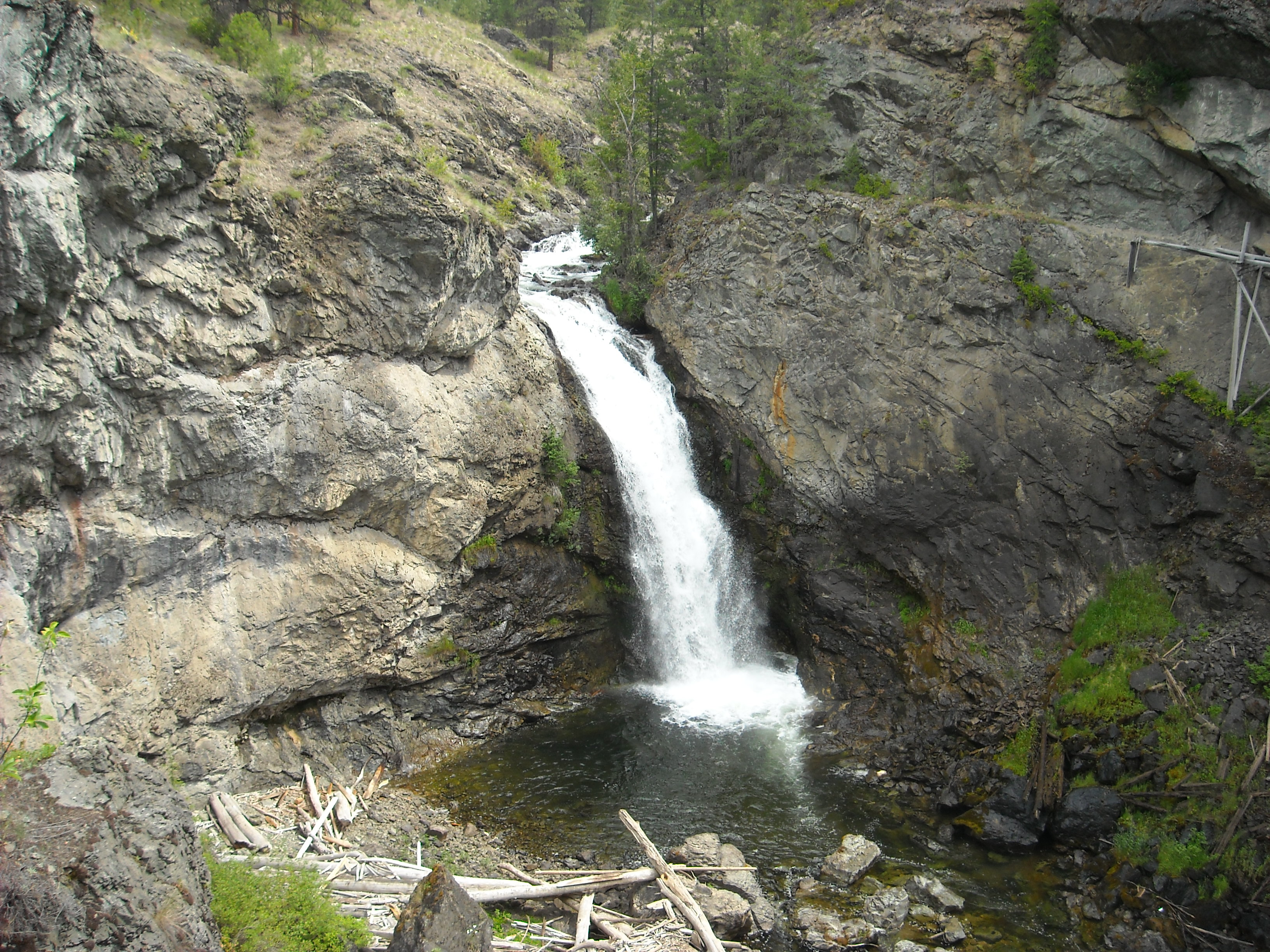
- Interactive map of Boundary Falls
- Coordinates: 49°02′16″N 118°42′26″W
- Type: Plunge
- Total height: 40 feet (12 m)
- Number of drops: 1
- Longest drop: 40 feet (12 m)
- Total width: 10 feet (3.0 m)
- Watercourse: Boundary Creek

Boundary Falls is a medium-sized waterfall on Boundary Creek in British Columbia, Canada. Boundary Creek is a tributary of the Kettle River. It is located within a small canyon a little over halfway between Midway & Greenwood, beside the town which was named after the falls, Boundary Falls.

== The falls ==
Boundary Falls is about 40 feet in height. It is located a couple hundred feet below the head of a small canyon that Boundary Creek enters as it passes by the town of Boundary Falls. The falls are easily viewed from the canyon rim and the base of the falls can be reached by carefully climbing down the steep canyon walls. The brink of the falls can also be reached with relative ease.

== Dam near falls' brink ==
Remains of an old dam which generate power from the city of Greenwood can be found about 100 feet upstream from the falls' brink.

== Boundary Falls Smelter ==
Boundary Falls was settled in 1890 by a large flock of miners. There were many mining opportunities in the area so the miners started building a smelter which they finished in 1901. In 1902 though, the smelter was "blown in" by high operating costs, coke shortages, financial difficulties, and low copper prices.

In 1907, the smelter officially closed and was eventually forgotten. Today, only slag piles remain of what was once a good sized refining and power generating settlement.

== See also ==
- List of waterfalls
- List of waterfalls in British Columbia
- Boundary Creek Provincial Park
