= Niagara, British Columbia =

Niagara
- Location of Niagara in British Columbia
- Coordinates: 49°06′00″N 118°28′00″W
- Country: Canada
- Province: British Columbia
- Region: Boundary Country
- Regional district: Kootenay Boundary
- Area codes: 250, 778, 236, & 672

Niagara is on the west side of the Granby River, near the junction with Fisherman Creek, in the Boundary Country region of south central British Columbia. The small community is about 12 kilometres (7 mi) north of Grand Forks on North Fork Rd.

== Prosperity ==
In 1898, a Spokane syndicate bought part of the "Gunnysack Jones" ranch, and laid out a townsite, in anticipation of the coming Columbia and Western Railway (C&W), which was acquired by the Canadian Pacific Railway. The source of the name is unclear, but could either be the Niagara Falls, or the USS Niagara, which served in the Spanish–American War that year. During the railway construction, a work camp was cut out of the mountainside for the nearby 210-metre (700 ft) tunnel. The town experienced rapid growth and brief prosperity. Having 12 hotels at its peak, a stage coach ran daily to Grand Forks.

== Fading ==
In 1900, the train station name changed to Fisherman, but the locality faded away after the railway construction workers moved on. The C&W siding was named for the creek, first mentioned in 1894, but not officially adopted until 1956. By 1918, all permanent residents had left. Niagara was by rail 8 kilometres (5 mi) north of Grand Forks, and 13.5 kilometres (8.4 mi) southeast of Eholt. The stop closed in 1955.

The former residential and commercial properties are a ghost town. Several much later residences are concentrated near the river.

Train Timetables (Regular stop or Flag stop)
| Year | 1901 | 1903 | 1905 | 1909 | 1912 | 1916 | 1919 | 1929 | 1932 | 1935 | 1939 | 1943 | 1948 | 1953 | 1954 | 1955 |
|---|---|---|---|---|---|---|---|---|---|---|---|---|---|---|---|---|
| Ref. | | | | | | | | | | | | | | | | |
| Type | Reg | Flag | Flag | nil | Flag | Flag | Reg/Flag | Flag | Flag | Flag | Flag | Flag | Flag | Flag | Flag | nil |

== Virginia City ==
In 1898, 2.4 kilometres (1.5 mi) upstream on the Granby, another town seeking to cash in on railway construction and mining prospects was surveyed. Although a hotel was allegedly under construction, the place faded into obscurity.
