= Hardy Mountain Doukhobor Village =

Coordinates: 49°02′16″N 118°29′29″W

Hardy Mountain Doukhobor Village is in the Boundary region of south central British Columbia. The former Doukhobor community is about 4.3 kilometres (2.7 mi) northwest of Grand Forks on Hardy Mountain Rd.

== Settlers on Hardy Mountain ==
In 1894, Thomas Hardy was proprietor of the Boundary Falls hotel. By 1897, the term Hardy Mountain defined the respective mining claims. In 1910, a road was built up the mountain.

A 1915 civic directory included Edward Blake Hardy, a younger brother, among the five residents of the Hardy Mountain community, but no mention was made of the neighbouring Doukhobor settlers. Constructed in 1912, the main Doukhobor communal house is a two-storey wood and brick building with front and back porches. Kitchen and dining facilities occupied the main floor, with multiple small bedrooms on the second floor. Known as the Makortoff Doukhobor village, the community lived off the land and was largely self-sufficient. However, by the 1960s, changing circumstances forced the closure and sale of such properties.

In 1930, a new wagon road was built up the mountain. The Hardy brothers' name also appears in Hardy Mountain Road, Hardy View Lodge, and Hardy Creek.

== Operating museum ==
Peter Gritchen purchased the 6.8 hectares (16.9 acres) property in 1971 and opened the Mountain View Doukhobor Museum the following year. A collection of Doukhobor artefacts, household items, implements, and tools were housed in the various farm buildings. After Gritchen's death in 2000, The Land Conservancy of BC (TLC) purchased the site in 2004, and the Boundary Museum Society (BM) purchased much of the collection, which was largely left on display while the museum remained open. Over the decades, many original buildings had been significantly altered or neglected prompting demolition. Only five original buildings remain standing.

== Site preservation ==
Since acquiring the property, TLC was unable to undertake the necessary preservation work of buildings. By 2012, TLC was in dire financial straits and the museum had closed. Consequently, for safekeeping, the BM removed two 12-metre (40 ft) long storage containers filled with artifacts owned by BM.

After TLC filed for bankruptcy, the Regional District of Kootenay Boundary (RDKB) bought the property in 2015 and assumed the mortgage, with a view to establishing partnerships with groups interested in restoring the tourist attraction. The site has been designated a historic site by the National Trust for Canada and the RDKB. Overlooking the Kettle River and Granby River valleys, this is the only Doukhobor "great house " in BC remaining on its original site.

== Other Grand Forks Doukhobor sites ==
In 1909, the Doukhobor Christian Community of Universal Brotherhood (CCUB) purchased 1,600 hectares (4,000 acres) in the Grand Forks area.

On Reservoir Rd, about 2.9 kilometres (1.8 mi) south of the former village, is the Fructova Heritage Site. The property includes the former Doukhobor school, which was open 1929–1949. The former community brick factory, just below the school grounds, supplied the bricks used in construction. The Doukhobor Historical Society of BC completed renovations in the early 1990s, changing the name from Fruitova to Fructova to reflect proper Russian language usage. The site became home to the Boundary Museum & Interpretive Centre in 2009.

The brick factory, which operated 1909–1932, produced bricks for community use and external sales. Although the Coryell ranch had carried out primitive brickmaking using the clay deposits on the site, the CCUB installed steam powered machinery and equipment to manufacture on a commercial scale. Following closure during the Great Depression, the CCUB demise in 1938 sealed the factory's end.

The Pride of the Valley Flour Mill, built in 1915, operated on steam power until 1945, when the mill closed. Reopened in 1962, using an electric hammer mill, the mill ceased production in the late 2010s.
