= Jolly Jack's Lost Mine =

- Creek
- Location of Lost Mine (Skeff Creek)
- Coordinates: 49°03′00″N 118°33′00″W
- Country: Canada
- Province: British Columbia
- Regional District: Boundary Country

Jolly Jack's Lost Mine is a legend about a hidden placer mine supposedly located in the Boundary Country of British Columbia. The mine has been written about by local historians and various magazines. Many have searched for the lost placer mine of Jolly Jack. It is a local legend in the Boundary Country.

== Legend ==
A prospector named Jack Thornton had been prospecting many creeks around the city of Greenwood, British Columbia. Jack Thornton was also known as "Jolly Jack" and had been in the US Navy at one time. Thornton lived in a cabin located near Boundary Creek. Thornton discovered a source of placer gold somewhere near Greenwood around 1900. The gold discovered was coarse and heavy with nuggets weighing an ounce. This gold was red and heavily oxidized like dark copper. Thornton never revealed the location of the source of his placer gold. In 1967, May Jones, one of Thornton's surviving daughters left an account at the Greenwood Museum. May states "My mother told me that my father really had found something very rich, but where it was he took to the great beyond with him. It was in the spring of the year. He left home in the morning and was back at night and he had a baking powder can full of nuggets when he came home. He was old and so was his horse so he could not have gone far. She said he told her that they had struck it rich at last, but he never told mother where it was, or anyone else. Many have looked for it but none have ever found the place yet."

== Location ==
Thornton lived on Boundary Creek and mined many creeks in the area. Local historian Bill Barlee speculates the lost mine could not have been Rock Creek or its tributaries such as Jolly, McKinney and Baker because that round trip would require two days travel from Jack's Cabin. The Kettle River and Boundary Creek could not be the location because the gold was too fine and sparse when compared to Thornton's gold. Bill Barlee believes the area where Jack found his gold was Fourth of July Creek with its tributaries. A local prospector in Greenwood named Peter den Hartog claimed he found Jolly Jack's lost mine. The gold Hartog found in Skeff Creek matched the characteristics of Jack's gold. Skeff Creek is a tributary of Fourth of July Creek and is the reputed location of Jolly Jack's lost mine.

== Skeptics ==
Some skeptics claim Thornton did not have a lost source of placer gold. E. Jacobs wrote about Thornton following his death. The account was written in the May, 1903 issue of the Mining Record. The article does not indicate that Jack ever had any secret placer location or "lost mine". Thornton lived on a periodical pension allowance from the US government. Ms. Thornton took in daywork and washing to support the family. This account does not indicate someone who had an unlimited amount of gold at their disposal. Some local prospectors believe Jolly Jack had gold stashed from older claims he once worked. This cache was to keep prospectors from spying on his tunnel operations. In 1865 Jolly Jack wing-dammed a location where Salmon Creek emptied into the Pen d’Oreille near junction with Columbia at Fort Shephard. Jack recovered a lot of gold from this location and may have cached some it. On April 3, 1903 Jack Thornton died.

== See also ==
- Jolly Creek – A tributary of Rock Creek named after Jolly Jack.
- Jolly Jack Creek – A tributary of Boundary Creek named after Jolly Jack.
- List of lost mines
