= May Creek (British Columbia) =

Watercourse in British Columbia, Canada

Coordinates: 49°01′02″N 118°32′31″W

May Creek is a creek located in the Boundary Country of British Columbia. The creek is a tributary of July Creek. May Creek flows into July Creek about five miles west of Grand Forks, British Columbia. The creek has been mined for gold.
