= Eholt =

Ghost town in British Columbia, Canada

Coordinates: 49°09′N 118°34′W

Eholt is in the Boundary Country region of south central British Columbia. This ghost town, on BC Highway 3, is by road about 27 kilometres (17 mi) northwest of Grand Forks and 14 kilometres (9 mi) northeast of Greenwood.

== Name origin ==
Louis Eholt arrived in the early 1890s, and established a cattle ranch. The name of the new town, which George A. Rendell developed, is first mentioned in 1898. Louis Eholt did not remain long enough to become a resident. Eholt's name had once applied to Midway, and the title, Little Eholt, later applied to Columbia in the 1910s.

== Railway ==
The Canadian Pacific Railway's (CP) West Robson–Midway extension of the Columbia and Western Railway arrived in 1899. From Eholt Junction, a spur southward to the copper ore mines of Phoenix opened in 1900. Eholt became an important CP location with a water tank, rail yard, seven-stall roundhouse, and bunkhouses. After the Great Northern Railway (GN) spur reached Phoenix in 1905, GN took the lion's share of ore traffic, and CP experienced train crew layoffs. GN passenger travel was also faster to Vancouver.

A May 1912 fire destroyed the roundhouse. The next year, Eholt lost significance when Grand Forks was developed instead as the divisional point, with a 10-stall roundhouse and machine shops. The former Eholt train station was 13.5 kilometres (8.4 mi) northwest of Fisherman, and 13.8 kilometres (8.6 mi) northeast of Greenwood. The Phoenix mines exhausted, CP lifted the spur in 1921.

In 1991, the CP track was abandoned westward in its entirety, and eastward almost to Castlegar.

Train Timetables (Regular stop or Flag stop)
Year	1904	1907	1919	1929	1932	1935	1939	1943	1948	1953	1954	1961
Ref.												
Sthn. Main	Regular	Regular	Regular	Flag	Flag	Flag	Flag	Flag	Flag	Flag	Flag	Flag
Branch	Regular	Regular	Regular									

== Early community ==
G.A. Rendell was the inaugural postmaster 1899–1900. At its peak, the five hotels, two sawmills, general store, dry goods/grocery store, butchers, barber, drug/stationery store, watchmaker/jeweller, blacksmiths, livery, and constable, served a population of about 250.

In August 1912, a fire destroyed the Summit and Northern hotels, the drugstore, post office, and other buildings. Looters descended upon the ruins. The GN incursion of Phoenix in 1905, the fires of 1912, the CP relocation of 1913, and the Phoenix spur removal of 1921, each shrank Eholt and finally shuttered the remaining hotel. The death of David Oxley, postmaster 1921–1927 and storekeeper, permanently closed the general store. Anna Tofelt was the final postmaster 1928–1948, leaving a population of about 15 in the vicinity. The sole resident left in 1960.

== Present site ==
A roadside marker at the highway pullout stands beside the former main street of the town. The foundations of the station and section house, and a cement pillar, lie among the trees that dot the farmland. The foundation of the third water tower exists about 700 metres (0.4 mi) east of the station site. The former CP right-of-way is now a rail trail. In 2011, mining test drills were conducted in the area.

== Television ==
Eholt was featured on the historical television series Gold Trails and Ghost Towns, season 3, episode 4.

== Summit City ==
About 5 kilometres (3 mi) south on the CP main line, this town, associated with nearby mining, existed 1899–1903, before being abandoned.

== See also ==
- "1899 Kootenay map". www.library.ubc.ca. p. 1.
- Ghost Towns and Mining Camps of the Boundary Country , p. 116, at Google Books
