= Anaconda (disambiguation) =

An anaconda is a large, non-venomous snake found in tropical South America.

Anaconda may also refer to:

== Art and entertainment ==
=== Music ===
- "Anaconda" (song), a 2014 song by Nicki Minaj
- "Anaconda" (Luísa Sonza song), 2021, with Mariah Angeliq
- "Anaconda", a song by The Sisters of Mercy, 1983
- "Anaconda", a song by the Melvins from the album Bullhead, 1991
- "Anaconda", a song by Uri Caine from the album Solitaire, 2001
- "Anaconda", a song by Drop the Lime and Untold from the album FabricLive.53, 2010
- Anaconda (instrument), a contrabass serpent

=== Other uses in art and entertainment ===
- Anaconda (film series), an American horror filmseries
  - Anaconda (1997 film), first film in the series
  - Anaconda (2025 film), a reboot of the 1997 film of the same name
- Anaconda (character), a supervillain in the Marvel Comics universe
- Anaconda (poker), a variant of the card game poker
- Anaconda (TV series), a planned prequel series to The 100
- "Anaconda" (Casualty), a 1987 television episode
- "Anaconda", a short story by Horacio Quiroga

== Military ==
- Anaconda Plan, an outline strategy for subduing the South in the American Civil War
- Operation Anaconda, a military operation in Afghanistan in early March 2002
- Logistics Support Area Anaconda, a large American military base in Iraq
- DMV Anaconda, a Dutch military vehicle
- HMS Anaconda (1813), a Royal Navy brig-sloop
- HMAS Anaconda, a Royal Australian Navy auxiliary vessel during the Second World War
- Lavochkin La-250, a Soviet 1950s high-altitude interceptor aircraft prototype nicknamed "Anakonda"

== Mining ==
- Anaconda Copper, a defunct mining company which operated two American copper mines
  - Anaconda Copper Mine (Montana)
  - Anaconda Copper Mine (Nevada)

== Places ==
- Anaconda, British Columbia, a ghost town in Canada
- Anaconda, Missouri, an unincorporated community in the United States
- Anaconda, Montana, a small community in the United States
- Anaconda, New Mexico, a mining community in the United States
- Anaconda Range, a mountain range in Montana

== Software ==
- Anaconda (installer), an installer program for the Red Hat Linux and Fedora operating systems
- Anaconda (Python distribution)

== Roller coasters ==
- Anaconda (Kings Dominion), a defunct steel roller coaster in the United States
- Anaconda (Walygator Parc), a wooden roller coaster in France

== Other uses ==
- Anaconda (retailer), a chain of Australian outdoor clothing and goods stores
- Colt Anaconda, a .44 Magnum revolver
- Xbox Series X console (codename "Anaconda")

== See also ==
- Anakonda, a 2001 album by Akinyele
