= Boundary Falls, British Columbia =

Boundary Falls
- Location of Boundary Falls in British Columbia
- Coordinates: 49°01′59″N 118°42′04″W
- Country: Canada
- Province: British Columbia
- Region: Boundary Country
- Regional district: Kootenay Boundary
- Area codes: 250, 778, 236, & 672
- Highways: Highway 3

Boundary Falls is a locality in the Boundary Country of the Southern Interior of British Columbia, south of the city of Greenwood and west of the city of Grand Forks, British Columbia.

The small community, which consists of only a few small buildings, lies on the north banks of Boundary Creek at the head of a canyon the creek flows into. Not far downstream from the town, within the canyon, the creek drops over Boundary Falls, for which the town was named.
