= Flat Creek (Columbia River tributary) =

Stream in Washington, U.S.

Coordinates: 48°49′23″N 117°58′40″W

Flat Creek is a stream in the U.S. state of Washington. It is a tributary of the Columbia River, on the northwest side of the river to the northeast of the Kettle River.

Flat Creek most likely was named for the flatness of the nearby terrain.

== See also ==
- List of rivers of Washington (state)
