= Skeff Creek =

Coordinates: 49°03′N 118°33′W

Skeff Creek is a creek in the Boundary Country region of British Columbia. The creek flows east into July Creek, west of Smelter Lake, Similkameen Division Yale Land District. Skeff Creek used to be called Taylor Creek. The creek has been mined.

== Lost Mine ==
British Columbia historians Bill Barlee and Garnet Basque believes Skeff Creek is the location of Jolly Jack's Lost Mine.
