= Kettle Valley Rail Trail =

Rail trail in British Columbia, Canada

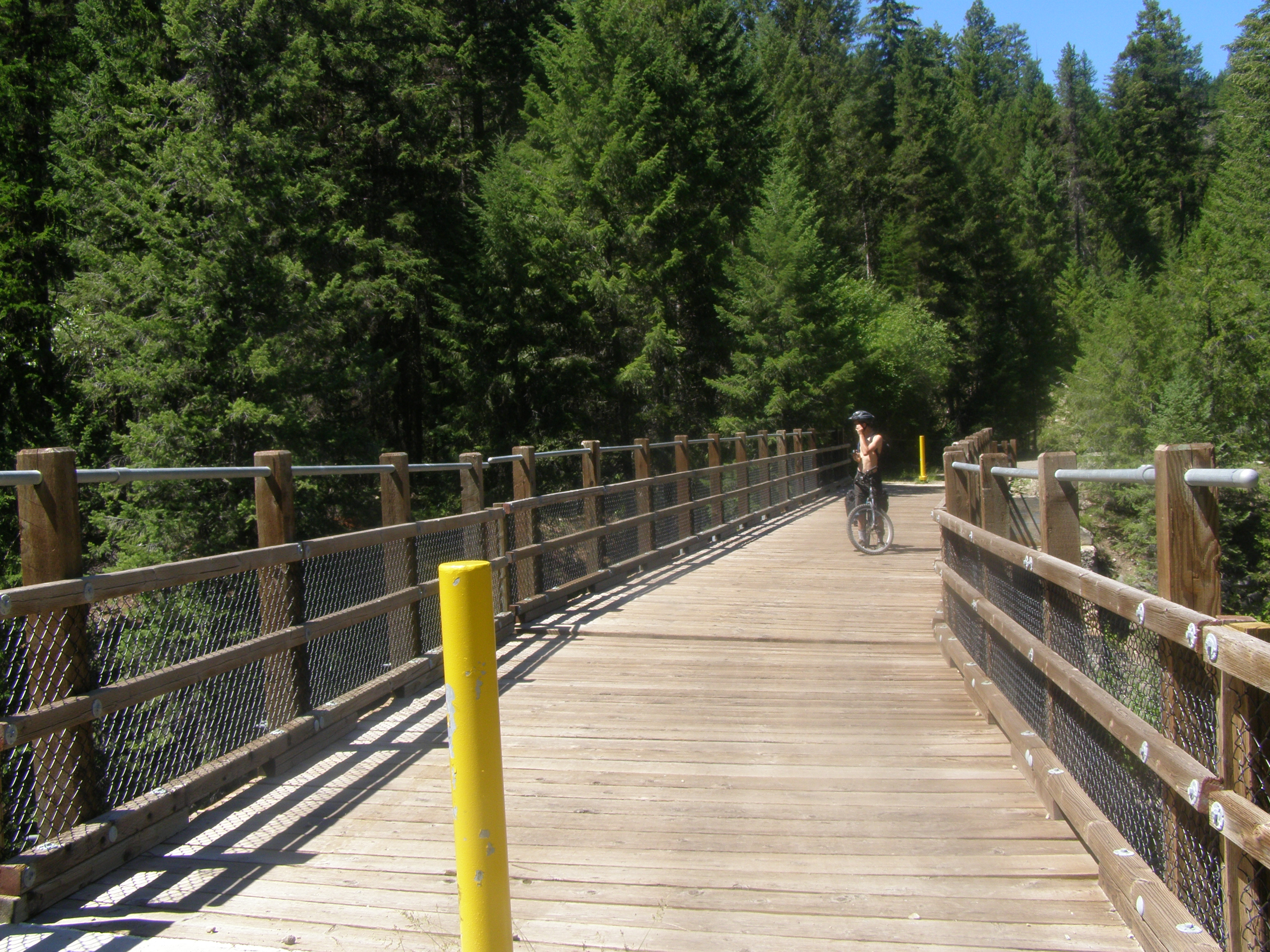
KVR Bridge over the West Kettle River

The Kettle Valley Rail Trail is a multi-use recreational rail trail located in the Okanagan-Boundary region of southern British Columbia.

The trail uses a rail corridor that was originally built for the now-abandoned Kettle Valley Railway. The trail was developed during the 1990s after the Canadian Pacific Railway abandoned train service.

== Myra Canyon Trestles ==
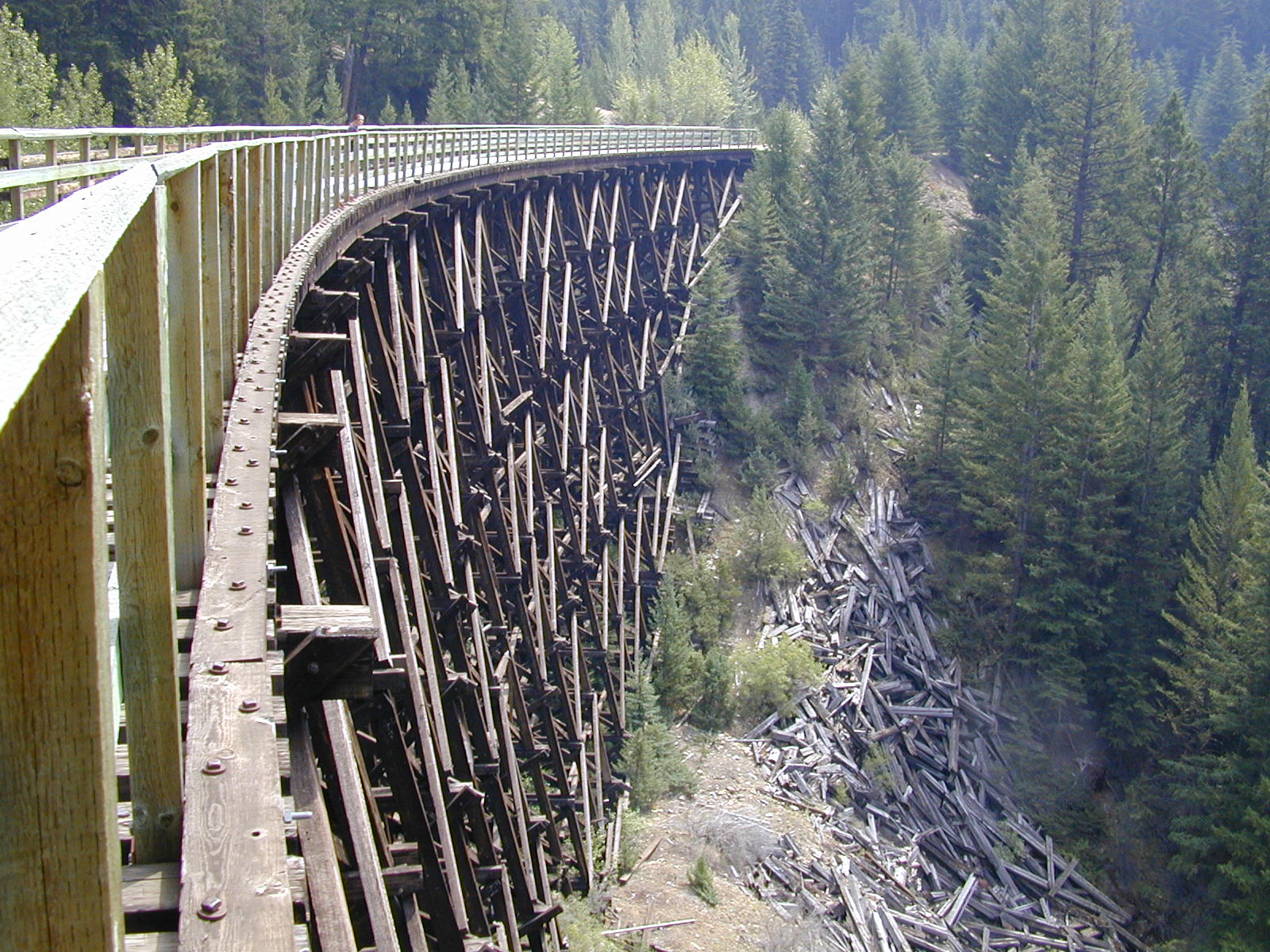
Photograph of Myra Canyon Rail Bridge taken just days before it was destroyed by fire. August, 2003.

One of the most popular sections of the Kettle Valley Rail Trail is the section through Myra Canyon.

Myra Canyon is located south of Kelowna on Okanagan Mountain. The section of line originally transited between Midway and Penticton. When the railway was built, the section of railway between Myra station and June Springs station required 18 wooden trestles and two tunnels in order to traverse the deep canyon.

For years after the abandonment of this section of rail line, the area was a noted attraction; with its relatively gentle grade, it became a hiker and cyclist haven. Years of disrepair on the trestles began to take their toll on the line. In some cases vandals had removed railway ties on the larger steel bridges, thus creating large gaps. In some cases hikers and cyclists wanting to cross the trestles would be required to walk on sections of steel no wider than a foot across in sections where the ties were removed. This would not normally be an issue, but many of these trestles and bridges were hundreds of feet in height. However, after a fatal accident involving a cyclist on one of the trestles, many people petitioned to have the bridges and trestles made safer. These upgrades included repairs after numerous years of disrepair, and the installation of handrails and planks so that people did not have to jump between each railway tie.

This section of the railway was designated a National Historic Site of Canada in 2002.

From August to September 2003, lightning sparked the 2003 Okanagan Mountain Park Fire in Okanagan Mountain Provincial Park. This fire rapidly grew in strength and size and made its way Southeast across Okanagan Mountain. This fire engulfed many portions of the KVR between Penticton and McCulloch Lake. After a valiant fight by the firefighters, the fire unfortunately claimed 12 of the 18 trestles within Myra Canyon. In addition, the bridge decks of two of the metal bridges were also destroyed in the fire.

Soon after the Okanagan Mountain Park Fire in 2003, the B.C provincial government announced that it would rebuild the damaged and destroyed trestles and bridges. Restoration of the trail was completed, with an official re-opening ceremony held June 22, 2008. In addition, safety improvements including clearing and rock face stabilization along the line have taken place.

== Severe Damage to Trail near Princeton ==
The extreme flooding event of November 2021 washed out many portions of the rail grade west of Princeton. Currently the path is unusable from Princeton to Coalmont, Tulameen, Brookmere, and Coquihalla Lakes.

== See also ==
- Kettle Valley Railway
- Kettle Valley Steam Railway
