= Andrew McCulloch =

Andrew McCulloch may refer to:

- Andrew McCulloch (civil engineer) (1864–1945), Chief Engineer of the Kettle Valley Railway in Canada
- Sir Andrew McCulloch (British Army officer) (1876–1960), commander of 52nd Lowland Division from 1934–1935
- Andrew McCulloch (politician) (died 1908), Australian politician
- Andrew McCulloch (drummer) (born 1945), English drummer
- Andrew McCulloch (writer) (born 1945), British television writer and actor
- Andrew McCulloch (footballer) (born 1950), English/Scottish footballer between 1970 and 1985
