= July Creek =

Coordinates: 49°00′00″N 118°32′11″W

July Creek is a creek which is located in the Boundary Country region of British Columbia. The creek is west of Grand Forks and flows into the Kettle River. It was discovered around 1860 and was panned for gold.
