= Grand Forks Railway =

Overview
- Headquarters: Grand Forks, British Columbia
- Reporting mark: GFR
- Locale: British Columbia
- Dates of operation: 1993–

Technical
- Track gauge: 4 ft 8 1/2 in (1,435 mm) standard gauge

The Grand Forks Railway (reporting mark GFR) is a shortline railway company operating in the West Kootenay region of southeastern British Columbia.

== Former operators ==
In Grand Forks, a former north–south section of the Kettle Valley Lines (KVL) (the operating company for the Kettle River Valley Railway (KRVR) and the Spokane and British Columbia Railway) both crossed and connected with the Canadian Pacific Railway (CP) line near the north end of today's 5 St. The KRVR became the CP's Kettle Valley Railway. Although the former KRVR track north of this crossing no longer exists, it continues southwest almost to the south end of today's Cooper Rd.

The Pacific Abrasives & Supply yard is on the southeast corner of where the former KRVR crossed the former north–south Great Northern Railway (GN) spur that accessed north and northwest of Grand Forks. This abrasives company has been shipping processed slag from the former Granby smelter for use in sandblasting or coating roofing tiles. At this crossing, the GN track north, and the KVL track west, were lifted long ago. GN was consolidated into the Burlington Northern Railroad (BN) in 1970, which merged to become the Burlington Northern and Santa Fe Railway (BNSF) in 1996.

Since the Pacific Abrasives yard linked northeastward to the former CP track and southward to the wye connecting with the east-west BNSF track, this yard formed an interchange between the two systems, but each had running rights beyond this point. After CP withdrew tracks to immediately west of Castlegar in 1992, the company kept a switcher at Grand Forks and train crews travelled from Nelson to move cars to/from/over the BN. At the time, Pope & Talbot (sawmill), Canpar Industries (particle board), and several smaller customers used the service. However, CP found this arrangement uneconomical.

== GFR operation ==
In 1993, primarily under the oversight of Pope & Talbot, GFR was formed to operate a short section of former CP line and the connecting sidings. In 2004, Kettle Falls International Railway (KFR) replaced BNSF at the interchange. In 2008, Interfor Corporation bought the Pope & Talbot operations in Canada.

GFR, totalling 6.0 kilometres (3.7 mi) of track, may be the shortest shortline in Canada and possibly North America. The lone EMD SW8 locomotive GFR 6703, which was acquired from CP in 1993, was replaced in 2019 by a GATX Rail Locomotive Group SW1000 (GMTX 86).

In 2020, KFR parent, OmniTRAX, announced the planned closure of the Grand Forks–Laurier section of the KFR line within three years. A similar proposal in 2008 did not eventuate. Since GFR is disinterested in assuming this operation, a closure would also shut down the GFR. As of June 2023, KFR's Canadian trackage is no longer included on the Canadian Transportation Agency's list of notices of rail line discontinuance. And with no filing with the Surface Transportation Board for abandonment, it appears that OmniTRAX has cancelled their plans to discontinue service on the line.

== See also ==
"Grand Forks". www.trainweb.org.
