= Kettle Valley Railway =

Former subsidiary of the Canadian Pacific Railway on British Columbia

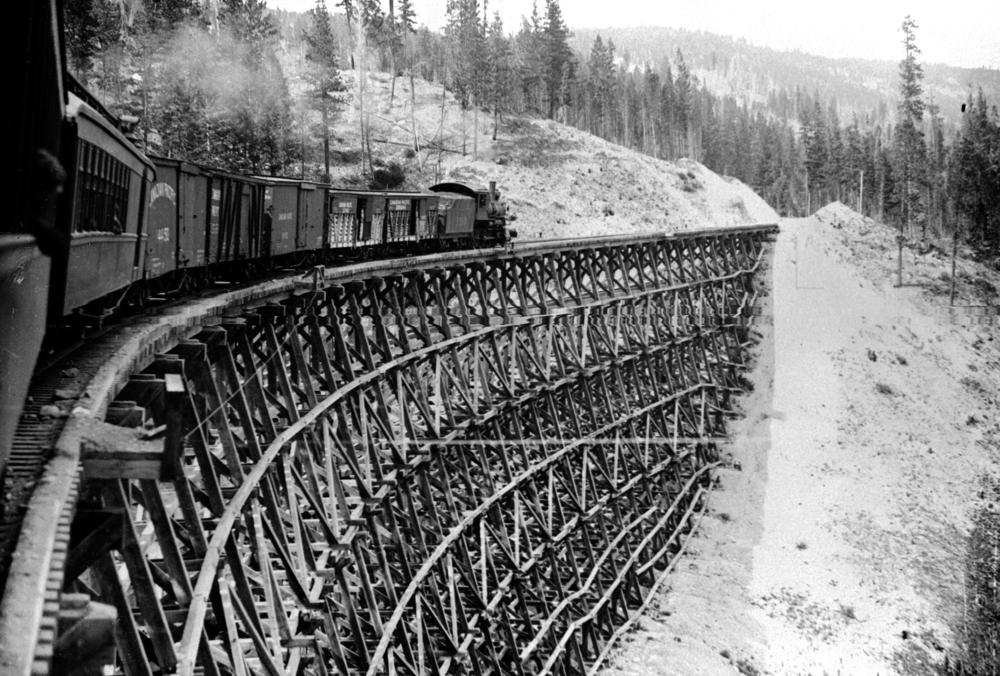
- Train on the Kettle Valley Railway crossing trestle at Sirnach Creek in 1916

Overview
- Parent company: Canadian Pacific Railway
- Headquarters: Penticton, British Columbia
- Reporting mark: KV
- Locale: Southern British Columbia
- Dates of operation: 1915–1989

Technical
- Track gauge: 1,435 mm (4 ft 8 1/2 in) standard gauge
- Length: 500 km (310 mi)

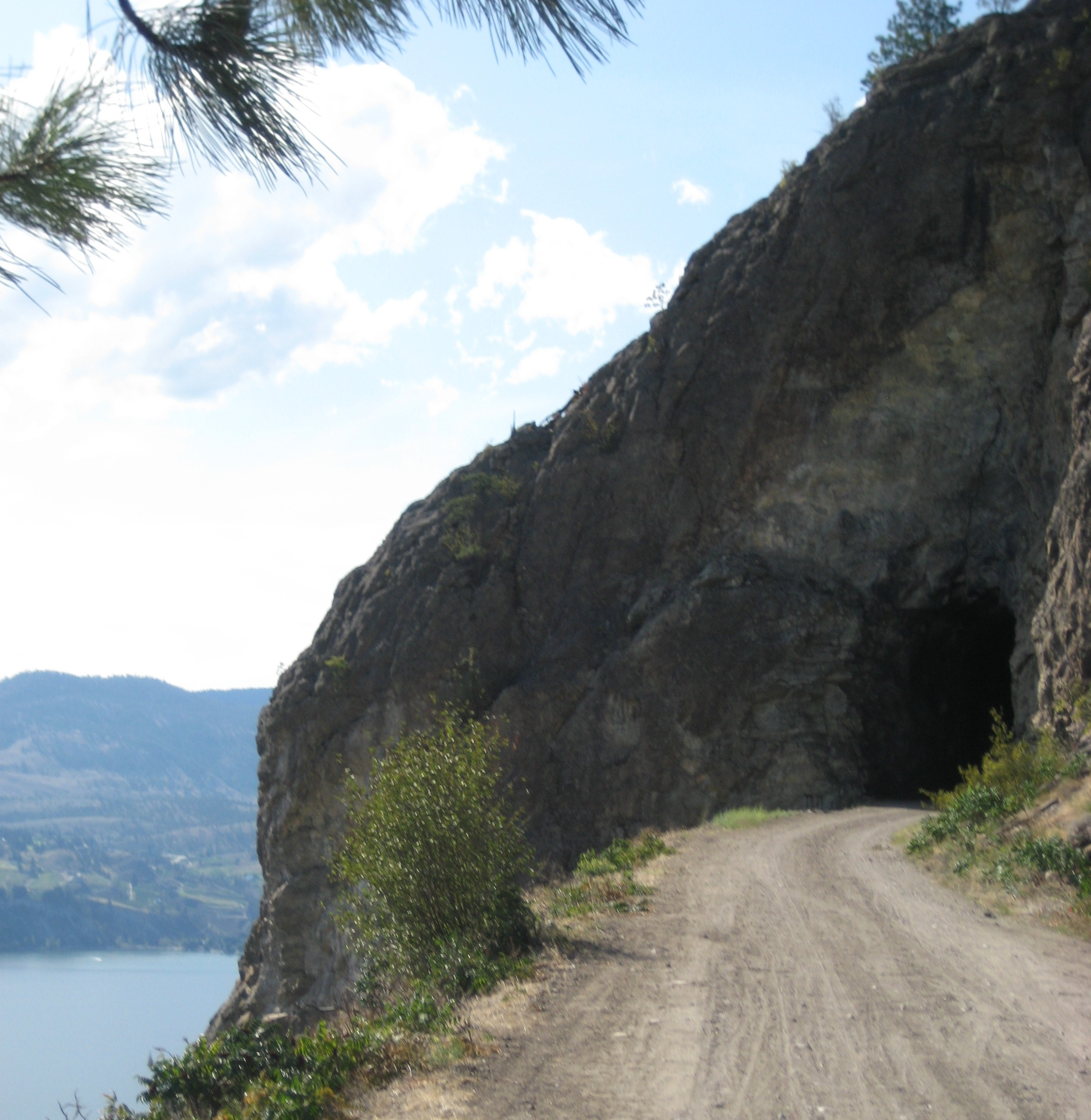
The Little Tunnel above Naramata, July 2009

The Kettle Valley Railway (reporting mark KV) was a subsidiary of the Canadian Pacific Railway (CPR) that operated across southern British Columbia, west of Midway running to Rock Creek, then north to Myra Canyon, down to Penticton over to Princeton, Coalmont, Brookmere, Coquihalla and finally Hope where it connected to the main CPR line.

It opened in 1915 and was abandoned in portions beginning in 1961, with the surviving portion west of Penticton seeing their last trains in 1989.

Much of the railway's original route has been converted to a multi-use recreational trail, known as the Kettle Valley Rail Trail, which carries the Trans-Canada Trail through this part of British Columbia. The Kettle Valley Steam Railway also operates on the only preserved section, near Summerland.

== History ==
The Kettle Valley Railway was built out of necessity to service the growing mining demands in the Southern Interior region of British Columbia. When the Canadian Pacific Railway (CPR) completed the transcontinental railway in 1885, the route cut through the Rocky Mountains at Kicking Horse and Rogers Passes, then followed the Fraser River for the remainder of the distance to Vancouver. This selected routing was significantly to the north of the mining towns within the Southern Interior. Those critical of the CPR believed that the railway should have been routed along the Dewdney Trail, through the southern portions of British Columbia in order to fulfill politician pledges to keep Americans out of British Columbia should they ever attempt to dominate mining operations in British Columbia's South. However, geography was the main reason the CPR followed the transcontinental railway route that it had selected. Too many mountain ranges stood between Alberta and Vancouver in the southern portions of British Columbia, and CPR had selected what they felt was the path of least resistance.

Once silver was discovered within the region in the spring of 1887, thousands of Americans flooded into the BC's Southern Interior, and essentially took control of the region. These miners quickly found that it was much quicker and cheaper to get their supplies from the recently completed Northern Pacific Railroad that transited through Spokane. Once word caught on, British Columbia's Southern Interior essentially became a commercial annex of the United States. Provincial and Federal officials quickly agreed that a second railway dubbed the "Coast-to-Kootenay" railway within British Columbia was required in order to help preserve Canadian sovereignty of British Columbia, and to also retain the valuable mining revenues within Canada.

The route selected involved connecting the railroad with Vancouver. However, this was not an easy task, as two mountain ranges stood in the way. Construction was some of the costliest per track mile when compared against most other North American railway projects, costing almost $20 million, and it took nearly 20 years to complete. Construction of the railway was not undertaken all at once, or even by one single company. In the process of realizing a completed "Coast-to-Kootenay" railway, a number of "paper railways" emerged. These were railways that never progressed beyond the proposed stage. However some railroads did progress past the proposal stage. The CPR initiated the Nicola Valley Railroad in the early 1890s. This railway connected the town of Merritt with the CPR mainline at Spences Bridge. The Midway & Vernon Railroad was a paper railway that actually started construction. It was hoped that the Midway & Vernon railway would connect Midway (the westernmost station of the CPR-owned Columbia and Western Railway) with Vernon. However, due to funding issues, construction on this railway was stopped. However portions of the completed railway grade were included in the Kettle Valley Railway when the section between Penticton and Midway was completed.

The core portion of the Kettle Valley Railway started in Hope up the steep Coquihalla Valley through the narrow rocky canyon to Coquihalla Pass, transited through GN track via Brookmere, Tulameen, to Princeton; again back on CP track up the grasslands at Jura, through the light forest to Osprey Lake, and down to Summerland, Penticton, Beaverdell and terminated in Midway. An additional, earlier-constructed CPR branch line connected to Spences Bridge, and Merritt. The KVR took over administration and operation of the CPR Spences Bridge-Nicola line in early 1916. The KVR connected this line up the Coldwater River valley to connect with the KVR mainline at Brodie, BC, just west of Brookmere, BC. (After the closure of the Coquihalla Subdivision in late 1959, the Brookmere-Merritt-Spences Bridge line became the connection to the CPR main line.)

After the end of the First World War, additional spur lines connected Copper Mountain with Princeton, Oliver with Penticton. (In 1944, the Osoyoos Subdivision was extended another 10 miles to connect Oliver with Osoyoos.) In the late 1930s until into the 1960s, the portion of the former Columbia & Western Railway from Midway, through Grand Forks continuing through to Castlegar was also periodically referred to as being part of the KVR as well. However, with the exception of some isolated track at Grand Forks, BC, no part of the Boundary Subdivision (Nelson-Midway) was ever part of official KV territory. Former Columbia & Western territory was always administered by the Kootenay Division. In later years of operations after 1962, the Kootenay Division administered the Carmi Subdivision all the way west to the east end of the yard at Penticton, BC.

Much of the KVR was built in response to the construction of the Vancouver, Victoria and Eastern Railway (VV&E). The VV&E was owned by Great Northern Railway. Although the CPR and the GNR had indulged in fierce competition in Boundary, West and East Kootenay Districts, that competition was cooling considerably by the time the construction of the KVR began in 1910. By 1913, prodded by the provincial government, the GNR had reached formal construction and then as regular operations loomed, joint track operations agreements with the KVR.

The Kettle Valley Railway between Merritt and Midway was opened for service on May 31, 1915. On that date, the first two passenger trains commenced service. The Kettle Valley Railway was its own entity, but in practical reality, under the thumb of senior CPR management after about 1912. The Canadian Pacific Railway eventually took over operations of the KVR at the beginning of 1931. The former KVR territory was folded into the CPR's BC District at that time as the Kettle Valley Division.

Rail service on the KVR consisted of both passenger and freight trains. Passenger service over the line consisted for many years of the Kettle Valley Express and the Kootenay Express, which carried passengers between Vancouver, BC and Medicine Hat, Alberta. Freight carried on the KVR consisted primarily of ore from the Kootenay region of British Columbia, as well as forestry products and fruit from the Okanagan. Finished goods were primarily brought into the Southern Interior on trains heading Eastbound. During the Kettle Valley Railway's lifespan, on numerous occasions it was called upon to act as "The Second Mainline" when washouts, avalanches and rock slides closed off the main CPR line through the Fraser Canyon. CPR recognized the benefit of having a second railway transiting through British Columbia, so beginning in the late 1930s and up until 1959, they set off on an upgrade program that saw the weight-bearing strength of the rails increased, as well as bridge and trestle improvements which brought the railway closer to mainline standards.

The first portion to be abandoned was the Copper Mountain Branch in 1957. The loss of traffic due to the Copper Mountain Mine closure spelled the end for this line. The second part of the KVR to be abandoned was the Coquihalla subdivision. In 1959 there was a large washout and the line was closed for some time. The CPR officials in Montreal decided to close the line permanently. Many say that their decision was short sighted. In the late 1940s/early 1950s the CPR invested quite a lot of money in upgrading the line. including many new bridges. (Others, better-informed, knew that the 1950s upgrades were part of a larger corporate strategy: it aimed at getting rid of unprofitable lines such as the Coquihalla Subdivision.)

Through freight was discontinued throughout the line in 1961, and the last passenger train operated in January 1964. With the end of scheduled through-freight service in September 1961, the former KVR line essentially became a wandering, low-trafficked branch line. All rail service stopped from Midway to Penticton (including the famed Myra Canyon section) in May 1973, with the trackage being labelled as abandoned in 1978. Rails along this section were removed in 1979-1980 as the result of a grant of abandonment from the Canadian Transport Commission.

In 1977 the CP abandoned part of the Osoyoos Subdivision from Okanagan Falls to Osoyoos. This was due to the loss of fruit traffic to trucks. The remainder of the former KVR was doing quite well. In the early 1970s, at various times when forest products were shipping at peak rates, trains were operated between Penticton and Spences Bridge daily. This traffic gradually diminished as the 1970s progressed. Train service declined correspondingly. In early 1983, wood chip service was moved to trucking and from that point onwards, rail traffic quickly diminished to a couple of trains per week. Penticton station building and mechanical servicing facilities were closed at Penticton in the spring of 1985. From that time until the end of train service in March 1989, train crews working the Princeton Subdivision west of Penticton, were headquartered at Merritt.

About 2 miles of former KVR track also survived westward from Midway to a sawmill at West Midway. After 1976, Kootenay Division crews handled whatever work was required west of Midway. In fact, even though the Carmi Subdivision had closed to through service between Penticton and Carmi, BC, train service was maintained as far west as Beaverdell until late 1976. After 1977, no trains went past West Midway.

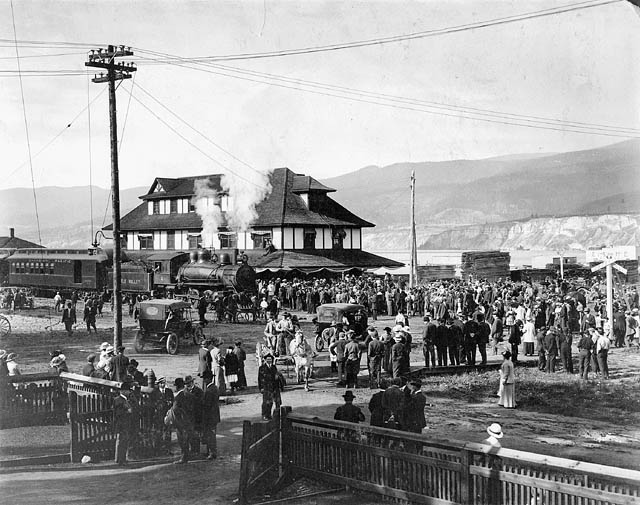
First KVR passenger train at Penticton, May 1915

One of the major landmarks on the former line are the Othello-Quintette Tunnels, which are lined up in a straight line, cutting through the Coquihalla River's gorge near Hope. They are open in summer for sightseeing. Andrew McCulloch, who oversaw the engineering projects which resulted in the complex series of bridges and tunnels through Coquihalla Canyon, was an avid reader of William Shakespeare. As a result of an anniversary of the Bard's death in 1916, McCulloch had a role in naming Coquihalla Subdivision stations after characters in Shakespearean literature, such as Iago, Romeo, Juliet, Lear, Jessica, and Portia. Shylock was never an official KVR station name. A spur just below Portia was unofficially known as 'Shylock Spur.'

On the Smithsonian Folkways FW03569 1961 recording, "Bunkhouse and Forecastle Songs of the Northwest," Stanley G. Triggs sings a song called "The Kettle Valley Line" while accompanying himself on the mandolin.

== Myra Canyon Trestles ==
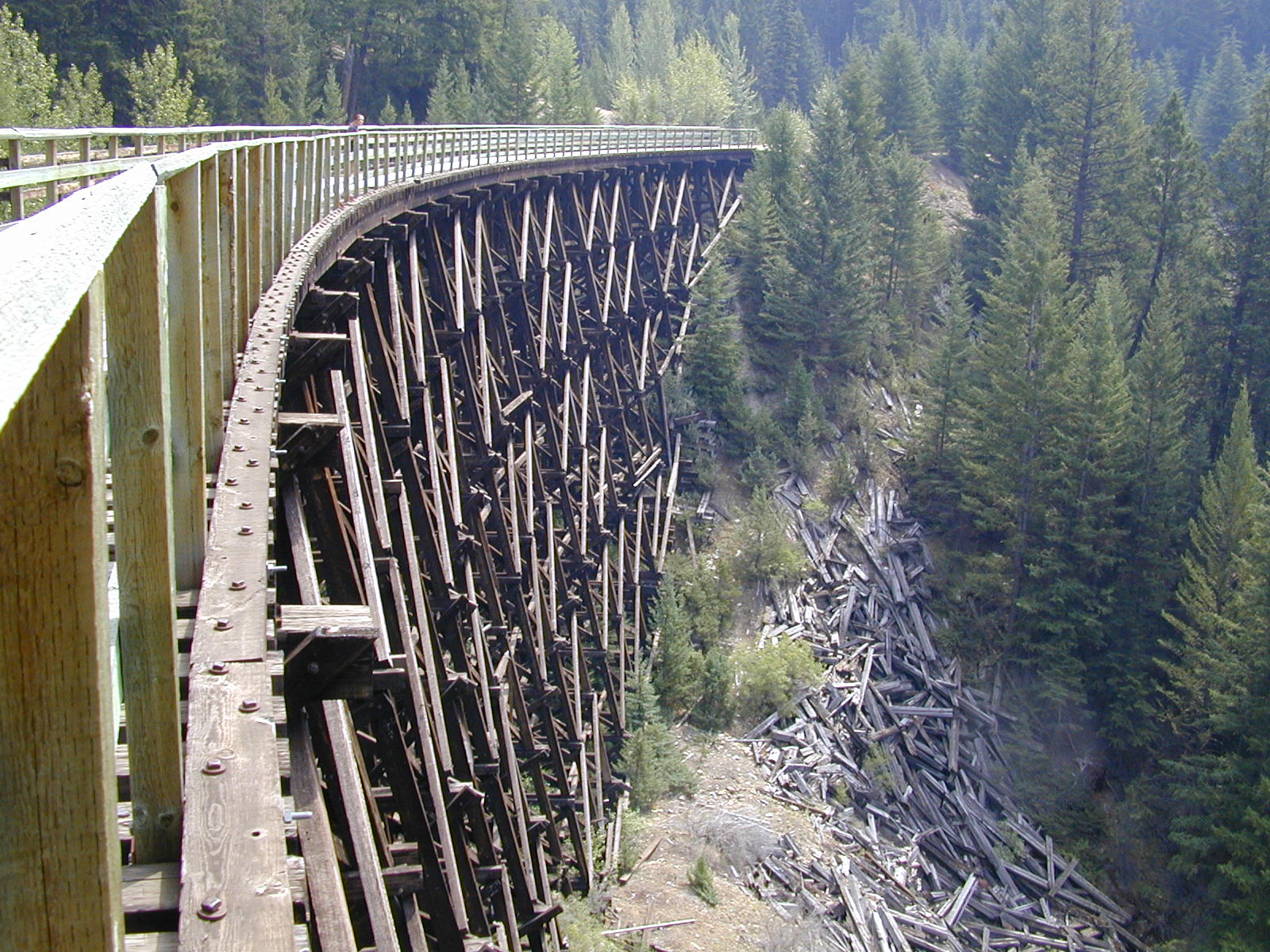
Myra Canyon Rail bridge near Kelowna on August 2, 2003, one month before it was destroyed by a forest fire

One of the most popular sections of the hiking trail along the former Kettle Valley Railway line is the section through Myra Canyon. Myra Canyon is located south of Kelowna on Okanagan Mountain. The section of line originally transited between Midway and Penticton. When the railway was built, the section of railway between Myra station and June Springs station required 18 wooden trestles and two tunnels in order to traverse the deep canyon.

For years after the abandonment of this section of rail line, the area was a noted attraction, with its relatively gentle grade, it became a hiker and cyclist haven. Years of disrepair on the trestles began to take its toll on the line. In some cases vandals had removed railway ties on the larger steel bridges, thus creating large gaps. Hikers and cyclists wanting to cross the trestles would be required to walk on sections of steel no wider than a foot across where the ties were removed. This would not normally be an issue, but many of these trestles and bridges were hundreds of feet in height. After a fatal accident involving a cyclist on one of the trestles, many people petitioned to have the bridges and trestles made safer. These upgrades included repairs, the installation of handrails and planks so that people did not have to jump between each railway tie.

This section of the railway was designated a National Historic Site of Canada in 2002.

From August to September 2003, lightning sparked the 2003 Okanagan Mountain Park Fire in Okanagan Mountain Provincial Park. This fire rapidly grew in strength and size and made its way southeast across Okanagan Mountain. This fire engulfed many portions of the KVR between Penticton and McCulloch Lake. Despite concerted efforts by the firefighters, the fire claimed 14 of the 18 trestles within Myra Canyon. In addition, the bridge decks of two of the metal bridges were also destroyed in the fire.

Soon after the Okanagan Mountain Park Fire in 2003, the BC provincial government announced that it would rebuild the damaged and destroyed trestles and bridges. In addition, safety improvements including stabilizing rock faces along the line and clearing rock also has taken place. The trestles have since been rebuilt and the trail is fully open to the public. The rebuilt trestles are maintained by a non-profit society. There are indications that plans for further improvement are in place, such as a restroom located at approximately the middle of the trail.

== Adra Tunnel ==
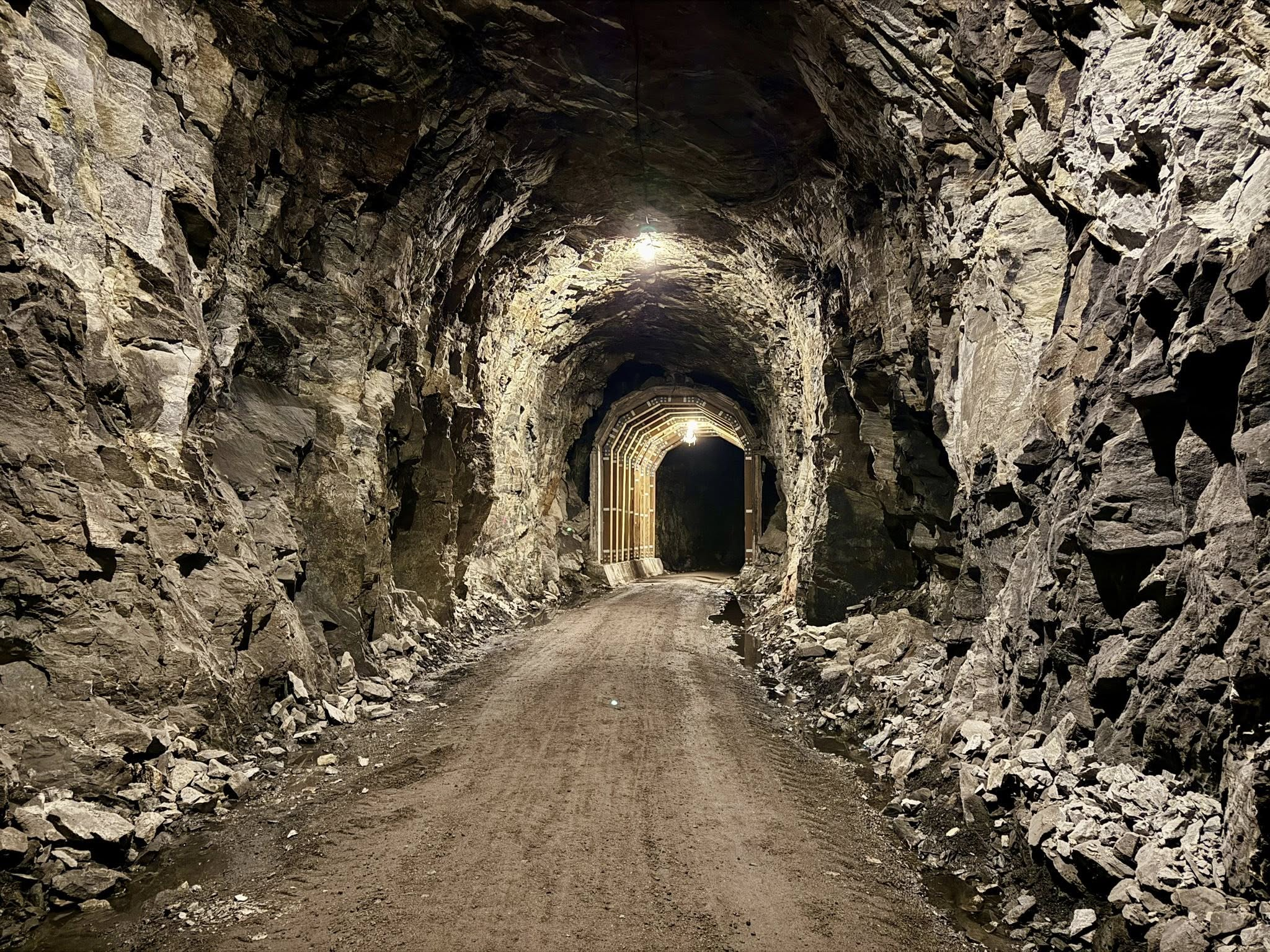
Adra Tunnel, 2025

Adra Tunnel was among several tunnels on the Kettle Valley Railway. This engineering feature took 16 months to construct, with approximately five feet of tunnelling completed per day, and was attributed to KVR Chief Engineer Andrew McCulloch. Tunneling was completed in April 1914 and track was laid in May 1914. Adra Tunnel is 1600 feet (489 metres) in length and forms a switchback on the rail grade hence its semicircular shape. The unique design of the tunnel was inspired by the Spiral Tunnels completed by McCulloch in 1909 on the Canadian Pacific Railway line in what is today Yoho National Park.

The 1911 survey report for the KVR called for the railway to maintain a gradual 1.5% gradient from Penticton and along the Naramata bench, what is today Okanagan Mountain Provincial Park and Myra Canyon. Upon inspection, Andrew McCulloch determined that this route would be too costly and devised the Adra Tunnel route. In 1912, McCulloch began to survey a route from Chute Lake to Penticton with a manageable grade. If the railway had been designed directly along the hillside the gradient would have been an impossible 4.5%. The maximum permitted grade for steam locomotives to maintain controlled braking levels was 2.2%. This section of line features two switchbacks and three levels of track.

== Quintette (Othello) Tunnels ==
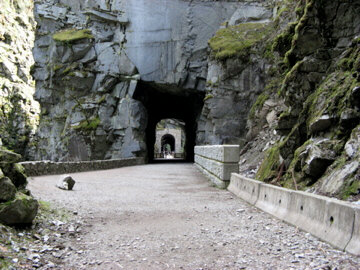
Quintette Tunnels, 2007

When constructing the railway through the roughest portion of the Coquihalla Canyon, chief engineer Andrew McCulloch determined that a routing proposed by his subordinates through this section was unnecessarily long or complex. McCulloch recalculated the requirements and decided that a straight section of track through this area was required; in order to achieve this, five closely aligned tunnels would be required. He also determined that two bridges would need to be built between three of the tunnels. These tunnels were eventually known as the Quintette tunnels. These tunnels are a popular tourist attraction, and are located along the existing Coquihalla Highway (however they are not visible from the highway). These tunnels are also known as the Othello Tunnels because they are near the Othello Railway station, named for the Shakespeare character, as is the case with other stations on this stretch of the railway named by McCullough.

== Kettle Valley Steam Railway ==
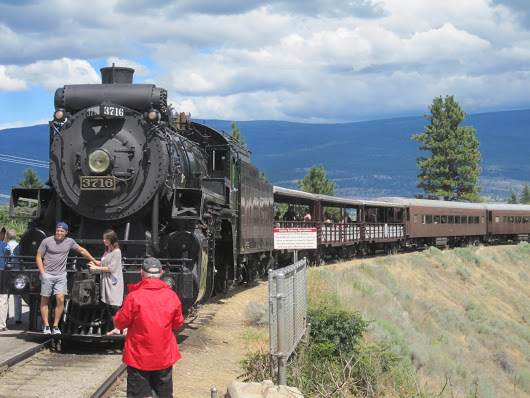
3716 at Canyon View

The Kettle Valley Steam Railway has been operating a heritage railway along a preserved 10-kilometre section from Prairie Valley Station to Canyon View Siding, near Summerland, British Columbia. This is the only active remaining section of the Kettle Valley Railway. The last freight haul on the KVR was in 1989, after which CP Rail obtained permission to abandon and remove the final section of rails. A heritage society sprang up in a bid to save a portion of the rail line. Their efforts were successful in preserving the section, and they proceeded to prepare rail operations. In the original position of the Summerland station, a maintenance building was erected. Sidings were placed at Prairie Valley, and at Canyon View (North side of the Trout Creek Bridge). Temporary stations were built at Prairie Valley, Canyon View and at the original Summerland Station. Eventually a permanent station was built at the Prairie Valley station providing a great access point for the railway.

The railway initially operated with one 1924 Shay locomotive loaned from the BC Forest Discovery Centre in Duncan, British Columbia. It was originally operated by the Mayo Lumber Company on Vancouver Island, and was specifically designed to work on rough forestry trackage.

Rolling stock for the railway was donated from BC Rail. These railcars are Canadian Pacific in origin, but were used by BC Rail for service on the Royal Hudson.

The most recent locomotive addition to the Kettle Valley Steam Railway is a Canadian Pacific Montreal Locomotive Works 2-8-0. This locomotive, originally delivered as number 3916, it now is number 3716 and runs on the KVSR. It was built for the CPR, and operated primarily in the Kootenays. It was stored in Port Coquitlam in 1966, and was restored in 1975. It was used as a backup locomotive to the Royal Hudson until it was retired from BC Rail's service in April 2001.

The train now travels to the middle of the Trout Creek Bridge. Plans also were to extend the run to Faulder along the final portions of remaining original trackage. The Steam Railway owns track to Faulder. However, tours do not run to that location.

== Model KVR Exhibits ==
There are several public model displays of the Kettle Valley Railway around the Okanagan Valley.

The S.S. Sicamous Marine Heritage Park in Penticton has an operational 46’ x 14’ layout that depicts the railway from Midway to Hope in HO scale. The site’s model has been continuously updated since fall of 1989 and has approximately 500 feet of track, running up to two trains at a time.

The upper floor of the Peachland Museum houses a scale model of the KVR as it existed between 1955 and 1965. The model is operational in sections.

The Historic O’Keefe Ranch in Vernon, BC, has a model railway maintained by the North Okanagan Railroaders Association (NORMA) and features displays of the KVR. As of 2026, on the second week of every month, NORMA runs a formal operating session where members are encouraged to bring their own model trains to run on the O’Keefe layout and work on related projects.

== Television ==
Kettle Valley Railway was featured on the historical television series Gold Trails and Ghost Towns, season 2, episode 8.

Because the CP route through the Rockies had been upgraded to modern steel bridges, the CBC miniseries The National Dream filmed its opening and a number of scenes where wooden trestles were wanted on the Myra Canyon section of the Kettle Valley Railway. The locomotive used was Canadian Pacific 4-4-0 No. 136, disguised as CPR 148.

== See also ==
- Kettle Valley Rail Trail
- Kettle Valley Steam Railway
- Canadian Pacific Railway in BC
- Vancouver, Victoria and Eastern Railway
- Columbia and Western Railway
