= Boundary Creek Provincial Park =

Provincial park in British Columbia, Canada

- IUCN category II (national park)
- Location within British Columbia
- Interactive map of Boundary Creek Provincial Park
- Location: Similkameen Division Yale Land District, British Columbia, Canada
- Nearest city: Greenwood, BC
- Coordinates: 49°03′30″N 118°41′47″W
- Area: 2 ha (4.9 acres)
- Established: March 16, 1956
- Governing body: BC Parks
- Website: bcparks.ca/boundary-creek-park/

Boundary Creek Provincial Park is a provincial park in British Columbia, Canada located south of Greenwood BC in that province's Boundary Country, adjacent to BC Highway 3. The eponymous Boundary Creek flows through the park.
