= Jolly Jack Creek =

Coordinates: 49°02′N 118°44′W

Jolly Jack Creek is a creek located in British Columbia. The creek flows south into Boundary Creek. This creek was named after local prospector Jolly Jack Thornton who was the second white settler in the district. This creek is also called "Jolly Creek".
