= Andrew McCulloch (civil engineer) =

Canadian civil engineer (1964–1945)

Andrew McCulloch (June 16, 1864 – December 13, 1945) was born in Lanark County, Canada West and died in Penticton, British Columbia. was a civil engineer with the Canadian Pacific Railway (CPR).

== Biography ==
A native of Lanark, Canada West, after graduating from the Dominion Business College in Kingston, Ontario in 1888, McCulloch moved to the West Coast of North America. There he got a job as an axeman on the Great Northern Railway.

Several other jobs followed, and in 1884 he was employed by the CPR on bridge repair work. He eventually became a Resident Engineer on the construction of the Lake Superior and Ishpeming Railroad, and this was followed in turn by work for the Nakusp and Slocan Railway in British Columbia, for the CPR's line through the Crowsnest Pass, for the Columbia and Western Railway and for the Grand Trunk Pacific Railway. He returned to work for the CPR as Divisional Engineer of Construction, Eastern, based in Montreal.

In early 1910, McCulloch was appointed Chief Engineer for the CPR's Kettle Valley Railway in British Columbia, a project which was to be the most challenging of his career and included the 18 Myra Canyon Trestles, 14 of which that were destroyed in 2003. Following completion of the line in 1916 he was appointed Superintendent of Operations.

One of Canada's leading construction engineers, he left the KVR in 1933 and continued as a consultant for many years up to his death in 1945. In 1934 he was Chief Engineer for Consolidated Mining and Smelting's Northeastern Railway in Stewart, British Columbia.

Andrew McCulloch is buried in the Lakeview Cemetery in Penticton overlooking the Kettle Valley Railway that was such an important part of his life. His gravestone 49.51935°N 119.57495°W, which is laid flush with the ground, can be found in section D, about 20 m south of the main entrance and about 5 m to the west of a fire hydrant on the adjacent Lower Bench Road.

== Legacy ==
McCulloch Station, McCulloch Lake on the Kettle Valley Railway, McCulloch Road in the nearby city of Kelowna, and Kelowna's McCulloch Station Pub are all named after McCulloch.
