= Columbia, British Columbia =

Former city in British Columbia, Canada

Coordinates: 49.031°N 118.465°W

Columbia was a city in the Boundary Country region of southern British Columbia.

Now the west part of Grand Forks, like Carson, it sought to rival Grand Forks for supremacy. Initially called Upper Grand Forks, the name changed to Columbia in 1899, because the prior name caused destination confusion for mail deliveries. When the Canadian Pacific Railway entered in 1899, the station was in Columbia, but called Grand Forks. Now operating as the Grand Forks Station Pub, the building is the oldest BC train station still in its original location. Residents of both towns voted to merge in 1901, but delays over the details, such as an acceptable name, delayed the amalgamation until 1903.

== See also ==
- List of municipalities in British Columbia
