= School District 51 Boundary =

School district in British Columbia, Canada

- Logo of School District 51 Boundary

Location
- Grand Forks Beaverdell, Grand Forks, Midway, Greenwood, Christina Lake, Rock Creek, in Boundary Country Canada

District information
- Superintendent: Anna Lautard
- Schools: 10
- Budget: CA$20.3 million

Students and staff
- Students: 1350

Other information
- Website: www.sd51.bc.ca

School District 51 Boundary is a school district in British Columbia. Centred in Grand Forks, it covers an area west to the outskirts of Kelowna, British Columbia and all along the border with the United States. This includes the communities of Midway, Greenwood, Beaverdell, and Rock Creek.

== History ==
School District 51 was created in 1996 with the merger of School District No. 12 (Grand Forks) and School District No. 13 (Kettle Valley).

== Schools ==
School	Location	Grades
Beaverdell Elementary School	Beaverdell	K-3
Big White Community School	Big White	K-11
Boundary Central Secondary School	Midway	8-12
Christina Lake Elementary School	Christina Lake	K-7
Dr. D. A. Perley Elementary School	Grand Forks	K-7
Grand Forks Secondary School	Grand Forks	8-12
Greenwood Elementary School	Greenwood	K-7
John A. Hutton Elementary School	Grand Forks	K-7
Walker Development Centre	Grand Forks	8-12
West Boundary Elementary School	Rock Creek	K-7

== See also ==
- List of school districts in British Columbia
