= Boundary Creek (British Columbia) =

Coordinates: 49°0′0″N 118°46′0″W

Boundary Creek is a tributary of the Kettle River in the Boundary Country region of south central British Columbia. The creek is approximately 32 kilometres (20 mi) in length, flowing from the northeast, passing east of Midway, and only the final one-quarter mile (0.40 km) is in northeastern Washington, US.

== Significance ==
Sometimes called American Creek around 1860, Boundary Creek was the better-known name locally. In September 1860, the American and British surveyors locating the 49th parallel met from opposite directions near the creek. However, their parallels were 270 to 370 metres (300 to 400 yd) apart, the American line proving the more accurate.

Discovered in 1859 by American prospectors, the gold-bearing creek was heavily mined over the next decade, and on a reduced scale over later decades. Gold nuggets then worth $50 were recovered.

== Lost mine ==
Local historian Bill Barlee speculates that the headwaters of Boundary Creek is the location of Henry Morgan's lost mine. Morgan was a resident of Greenwood, British Columbia.

== Provincial Park ==
The Boundary Creek Provincial Park is along this creek. Fish species in Boundary Creek include rainbow trout and brook trout.
