= HMAS Anaconda =

History
- Name: Anaconda
- Namesake: Anaconda snake
- Builder: Australian Ship Building Annexe, Tasmania
- Launched: 4 October 1944
- In service: 23 May 1945
- Out of service: 3 November 1945

General characteristics
- Tonnage: 316 tons
- Length: 125 ft (38 m)
- Beam: 24 ft (7.3 m)
- Depth: 12.6 ft (3.8 m)
- Installed power: 2 × Lister Blackstone diesel engines and 1 × Crossley auxiliary diesel engine
- Complement: 14
- Armament: 1 × 40 mm Bofors gun; 2 × .50 calibre machine guns

HMAS Anaconda was an auxiliary vessel operated by the Royal Australian Navy (RAN) during the Second World War. The 125 ft (38 m) wooden hulled ship was constructed at Glenorchy, Tasmania as one of 32 motor vessels originally intended for the Department of Commerce, but later allocated to the Australian Army. Launched on 4 October 1944 as Australian Army AV 1369 Lagunta, she was subsequently transferred to the RAN and commissioned on 23 May 1945, assigned to the Services Reconnaissance Department under the command of Lieutenant Charles Haultain. The ship briefly served a workshop and headquarters function in support of clandestine operations in waters around Borneo and the Moluccas during the last days of the conflict.

== Operational history ==
Anaconda commissioned into the RAN on completion of acceptance trials overseen by the Army Inspection Branch. On 24 May 1945, the Premier of Tasmania Sir Robert Cosgrove inspected the ship, which remained alongside in Hobart until 29 May before proceeding to Williamstown, Victoria and then Garden Island in Sydney Harbour. In Sydney, the ship's armament of three 20mm Hispano cannons were replaced with two .50 calibre Browning machine guns and a single 40 mm Bofors gun. Anaconda spent much of June and July in Sydney due to reliability issues with her engines, compounded by a shortage of spare parts. By 14 August, the ship was operating in waters off Papua New Guinea, calling on the port of Finschhafen and later proceeding to Morotai in the Dutch East Indies in support of Services Reconnaissance Department operations. In late September, Anaconda landed Australian troops and supplies at Ambon Island as part of an occupation force. For many of her crew, this was the first contact they had with the Japanese, coming after the formal surrender on 2 September.

== Decommissioning and fate ==
Anaconda was paid off on 3 November 1945 and transferred to the Australian Army in early 1946. She was towed from Borneo to Sydney and was sold in November 1946 for conversion into a fishing vessel.
