= Midway, British Columbia =

Midway
- Village
- Village of Midway
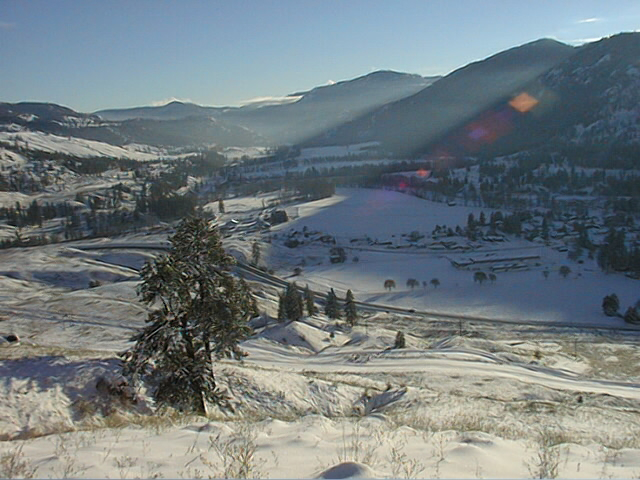
- Midway in winter

- Flag
- Motto(s): Between the Mountains and the Sea
- Location of Midway in British Columbia
- Coordinates: 49°00′37″N 118°46′17″W
- Country: Canada
- Province: British Columbia
- Region: Boundary Country
- Regional district: Kootenay-Boundary
- Founded: 1893
- Incorporated: 1967

Government
  - Governing body: Midway Village Council
  - Mayor: Doug McMynn

Area
  - Total: 12.23 km^{2} (4.72 sq mi)
- Elevation: 578 m (1,896 ft)

Population (2021)
  - Total: 651
  - Density: 53/km^{2} (140/sq mi)
- Time zone: UTC−07:00 (PT)
- Highways: Highway 3
- Waterways: Kettle River
- Website: Official website

Midway is in the West Kootenay region of south central British Columbia. The village lies 13 kilometres (8 mi) west of Greenwood and 51 kilometres (32 mi) east of Osoyoos along Highway 3.

== Name origin ==
Around 1884, Louis Eholt obtained a preemption that as a popular stopping place for travellers became known geographically as Eholt's. (A railway junction called Eholt later arose 17.8 miles (28.6 km) to the east.) In 1893, Capt. Robert C. Adams purchased the property and created the townsite subdivision. The initial name was Boundary Creek or Boundary City, but this had changed to Midway by 1895. Adams never provided a rational reason for the new name. The generally accepted explanation is that the village lies approximately midway between the Pacific Ocean and the Rocky Mountains. A less plausible theory is that he named it after Midway Plaisance at the Chicago World Fair of 1893.

== Railways ==
In 1899, the Canadian Pacific Railway (CP) extended the Columbia and Western Railway to Midway, creating a standard gauge link to Nelson. The Great Northern Railway (GN) arrived westward from Curlew, Washington in 1905. Despite CP opposition, the GN line westward reached Princeton in 1909. In 1914, the CP Kettle Valley Railway (KVR) connected to Penticton in 1914, and Vancouver in 1915. The GN track west of Curlew was abandoned in 1935. Passenger service on the KVR ended in 1964. The Penticton–Beaverdell track was abandoned in 1973, and Beaverdell–Midway in 1979. The CP eastward almost to Castlegar was abandoned in 1991.

== Early community ==
The post office and school opened in 1894. A provincial police constable was stationed from 1895. During the mining boom the population peaked at around 700 in 1895, falling to around 200–250 from the late 1890s, and 100 by the late 1910s.

In 1908, two masked bandits murdered Charles L. Thomet, a hotel proprietor. Despite a $1,000 reward, no suspects were brought to trial.

Midway incorporated as a village in 1967.

== Demographics ==
In the 2021 Census of Population conducted by Statistics Canada, Midway had a population of 651 living in 324 of its 340 total private dwellings, a change of 0.3% from its 2016 population of 649. With a land area of 12.23 km^{2} (4.72 sq mi), it had a population density of 53.2/km^{2} (137.9/sq mi) in 2021.

== Climate ==
Midway has a humid continental climate, characterized by high diurnal temperature variation throughout certain times of the year.

Climate data for Midway (1981-2010)
Month	Jan	Feb	Mar	Apr	May	Jun	Jul	Aug	Sep	Oct	Nov	Dec	Year
Record high °C (°F)	11.5 (52.7)	15.0 (59.0)	25.0 (77.0)	29.5 (85.1)	35.0 (95.0)	37.0 (98.6)	39.0 (102.2)	38.0 (100.4)	36.5 (97.7)	29.0 (84.2)	16.0 (60.8)	10.0 (50.0)	39.0 (102.2)
Mean daily maximum °C (°F)	−0.9 (30.4)	3.6 (38.5)	10.6 (51.1)	16.1 (61.0)	20.3 (68.5)	23.8 (74.8)	28.8 (83.8)	28.5 (83.3)	24.0 (75.2)	14.3 (57.7)	4.5 (40.1)	−1.3 (29.7)	14.4 (57.8)
Daily mean °C (°F)	−4.2 (24.4)	−1.4 (29.5)	4.0 (39.2)	8.5 (47.3)	12.4 (54.3)	15.8 (60.4)	19.3 (66.7)	18.7 (65.7)	14.4 (57.9)	7.2 (45.0)	0.7 (33.3)	−4.3 (24.3)	7.6 (45.7)
Mean daily minimum °C (°F)	−7.6 (18.3)	−6.3 (20.7)	−2.6 (27.3)	0.8 (33.4)	4.5 (40.1)	7.7 (45.9)	9.8 (49.6)	8.8 (47.8)	4.7 (40.5)	0.2 (32.4)	−3.2 (26.2)	−7.3 (18.9)	0.8 (33.4)
Record low °C (°F)	−33.0 (−27.4)	−31.0 (−23.8)	−20.0 (−4.0)	−8.0 (17.6)	−4.0 (24.8)	−1.0 (30.2)	3.0 (37.4)	0.0 (32.0)	−6.0 (21.2)	−15.0 (5.0)	−26.0 (−14.8)	−32.0 (−25.6)	−33.0 (−27.4)
Average precipitation mm (inches)	37.4 (1.47)	25.8 (1.02)	30.6 (1.20)	46.9 (1.85)	70.6 (2.78)	58.4 (2.30)	43.8 (1.72)	28.5 (1.12)	22.3 (0.88)	24.6 (0.97)	37.5 (1.48)	43.9 (1.73)	470.3 (18.52)
Average rainfall mm (inches)	7.7 (0.30)	12.5 (0.49)	22.5 (0.89)	45.9 (1.81)	70.6 (2.78)	58.4 (2.30)	43.8 (1.72)	28.5 (1.12)	22.3 (0.88)	24.1 (0.95)	20.9 (0.82)	7.8 (0.31)	365 (14.37)
Average snowfall cm (inches)	29.8 (11.7)	13.3 (5.2)	8.1 (3.2)	1.0 (0.4)	0.0 (0.0)	0.0 (0.0)	0.0 (0.0)	0.0 (0.0)	0.0 (0.0)	0.4 (0.2)	16.6 (6.5)	36.0 (14.2)	105.2 (41.4)
Average precipitation days (≥ 0.2 mm)	11.0	8.5	10.4	11.9	13.4	12.1	7.5	5.8	5.8	8.8	11.9	10.9	118
Average rainy days (≥ 0.2 mm)	3.5	4.6	8.2	11.8	13.4	12.1	7.5	5.8	5.8	8.6	7.7	2.4	91.4
Average snowy days (≥ 0.2cm)	8.1	4.5	3.0	0.37	0.0	0.0	0.0	0.0	0.0	0.25	5.2	9.0	30.42
Source: Environment Canada

== Government ==
Midway's local government consists of a mayor and four councillors elected to four year terms. The current mayor is Martin Fromme. The councillors are Dick Dunsdon, Darrin Metcalf, Fred Grouette, and Gary Schierbeck. James McMynn, Midway's first mayor, was the longest-serving mayor in Canada, retiring after 38 years.

Representation for school board is elected to School District 51 Boundary which is based in Grand Forks. It operates two schools in Midway; Boundary Central Secondary School and Midway Elementary School.

Census population: Midway
Year	Pop.	±%
1971	502	—
1976	589	+17.3%
1981	633	+7.5%
1986	640	+1.1%
1991	611	−4.5%
1996	686	+12.3%
2001	638	−7.0%
2006	621	−2.7%
2011	674	+8.5%
2016	649	−3.7%
2021	651	+0.3%
Source: Statistics Canada

== Local attractions ==
Midway is Mile Zero of the Kettle Valley Rail Trail, a popular wilderness cycling trail which follows the rail bed of the old Kettle Valley Railroad. At the trail's start, the Village of Midway operates the Kettle Valley Museum which highlights the life of early Boundary Country settlers. Notable museum features include a windmill from the Bubar farm that was originally purchased from the T. Eaton Co.

Construction of a bunk house has been started. When complete, the bunkhouse will offer accommodations for cyclists using the trail.

The Midway Curling Club is a popular destination for Boundary Area curlers. A hockey rink next door is popular with local youth. The curling rink is home to the Boundary District Curling Club Across the street from the curling rink and arena is McMynn park, a large green space which hosts many ball tournaments and picnics.

Adjacent to the Boundary Central Secondary School is a park in which two trees have grown together after being entwined together when the village was young. The trees were joined by Sinixt people as a symbol of the International Boundary Line dividing their people and territory. A plaque at the site reads: When the International Boundary Line was being surveyed in 1857–1861, the major portion of the large Indian band then living in this area then moved to the reservation in Colville, Washington. One of the Indians entwined two saplings, saying "Though divided we are united still - We are one."

Tubing the Kettle River is a popular summer activity, and the village maintains a stock of inner tubes at Frank Carpenter Memorial Park. The park is also a local campground, and is particularly popular with rv owners traveling through.

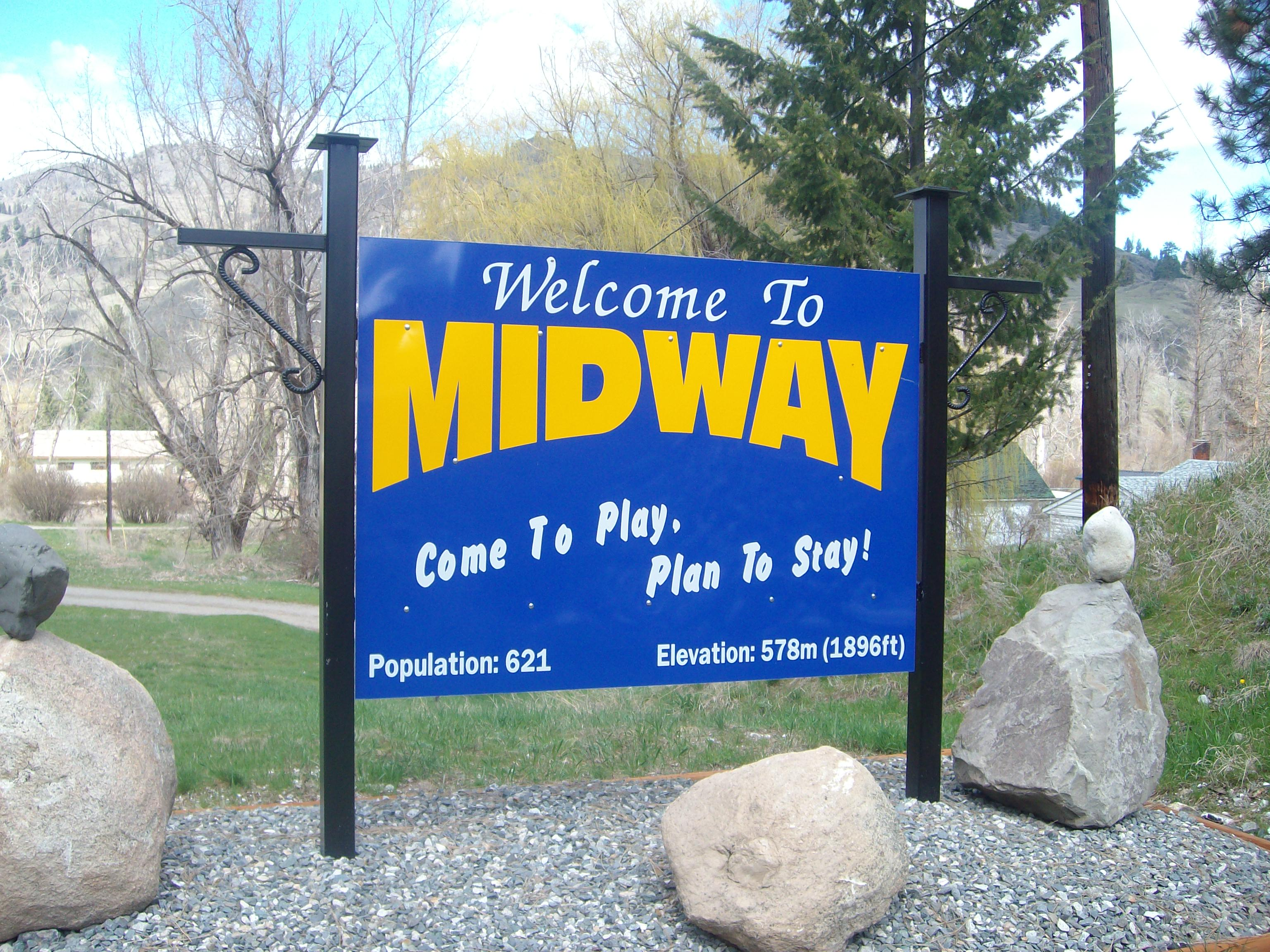
Midway's welcome sign

Midway features a grass airstrip known as Midway Aerodrome which is suitable for small planes. Hangars were added in 2005 to the airstrip. Plans exist for a paved runway, but the completion date is uncertain at this point.

Midway is also a host to ever growing music festival, named The Groove Music Festival.

== Television ==
Midway was featured on the historical television series Gold Trails and Ghost Towns, Season 3, Episode 11.
