= Beaverdell =

- Location of Beaverdell in British Columbia Beaverdell (Canada)
- Coordinates: 49°26′N 119°05′W
- Country: Canada
- Province: British Columbia
- Regional District: Kootenay Boundary
- Elevation: 838 m (2,749 ft)
- Time zone: UTC−08:00 (PST)
  - Summer (DST): UTC−07:00 (PDT)
- Area codes: 250, 778

Beaverdell is an unincorporated settlement in the Monashee Country of the Southern Interior of British Columbia, Canada, which lies to the east of the Okanagan Valley and north of the Boundary Country region.

Beaverdell is located midway along the West Kettle River between Kelowna and Rock Creek along British Columbia Highway 33.

Beaverdell was an amalgamation of the adjoining Beaverton and Rendell townsites in 1901. However, the Beaverton post office was not renamed until 1905.

Beaverdell is the namesake of the Beaverdell Range, which is on the settlement's east side and is the mountain spine lying between the West Kettle River and the Kettle River.

== Education ==
K-3 schooling in the community is provided by Beaverdell Elementary School.

Rock Creek Elementary school serves the community to grade 7, and Midway Secondary School provides grades 8–12. These small communities go to school from Monday to Thursday each week.

== Climate ==
Beaverdell experiences a humid continental climate (Köppen: Dfb) with one of the highest diurnal temperature variations in Canada. In addition, this community has the highest diurnal (24 hour) temperature variation in Canada from June through September by means of the dry and sunny climate, valley bottom location, relatively high elevation, and the surrounding geography.

Frost can occur even in the middle of summer. The daily temperature swings during the winter are less varied thanks to the presence of valley cloud.

Despite its proximity to Kelowna, Beaverdell receives about 25% more rain, due to orographic precipitation induced by its higher elevation within the Okanagan Highland. However, it receives less precipitation than Grand Forks, which is lower and has more desert-like vegetation.

Climate data for North Beaverdell Climate ID: 1130771; coordinates 49°28′42″N 119°02′49″W; elevation: 838.2 m (2,750 ft); 1981-2010
Month	Jan	Feb	Mar	Apr	May	Jun	Jul	Aug	Sep	Oct	Nov	Dec	Year
Record high °C (°F)	10.5 (50.9)	13.5 (56.3)	22.5 (72.5)	30.0 (86.0)	34.0 (93.2)	34.5 (94.1)	38.9 (102.0)	36.5 (97.7)	37.0 (98.6)	28.5 (83.3)	19.4 (66.9)	11.5 (52.7)	38.9 (102.0)
Mean daily maximum °C (°F)	−1.5 (29.3)	2.6 (36.7)	8.0 (46.4)	13.5 (56.3)	17.9 (64.2)	21.8 (71.2)	25.6 (78.1)	25.8 (78.4)	21.2 (70.2)	12.7 (54.9)	2.9 (37.2)	−2.6 (27.3)	12.3 (54.1)
Daily mean °C (°F)	−6.1 (21.0)	−3.7 (25.3)	1.3 (34.3)	5.8 (42.4)	9.8 (49.6)	13.3 (55.9)	15.9 (60.6)	15.6 (60.1)	11.2 (52.2)	5.0 (41.0)	−1.4 (29.5)	−7.0 (19.4)	5.0 (41.0)
Mean daily minimum °C (°F)	−10.6 (12.9)	−10.0 (14.0)	−5.5 (22.1)	−1.9 (28.6)	1.6 (34.9)	4.8 (40.6)	6.1 (43.0)	5.3 (41.5)	1.2 (34.2)	−2.7 (27.1)	−5.7 (21.7)	−11.3 (11.7)	−2.4 (27.7)
Record low °C (°F)	−37.5 (−35.5)	−35.5 (−31.9)	−30.0 (−22.0)	−10.5 (13.1)	−6.5 (20.3)	−4.0 (24.8)	−2.0 (28.4)	−4.0 (24.8)	−9.0 (15.8)	−22.0 (−7.6)	−35.0 (−31.0)	−43.0 (−45.4)	−43.0 (−45.4)
Average precipitation mm (inches)	41.9 (1.65)	29.0 (1.14)	27.9 (1.10)	37.4 (1.47)	54.4 (2.14)	61.8 (2.43)	41.0 (1.61)	32.4 (1.28)	32.7 (1.29)	32.5 (1.28)	41.2 (1.62)	53.5 (2.11)	485.7 (19.12)
Average rainfall mm (inches)	4.9 (0.19)	7.5 (0.30)	15.9 (0.63)	33.5 (1.32)	53.6 (2.11)	61.8 (2.43)	41.0 (1.61)	32.4 (1.28)	32.7 (1.29)	27.3 (1.07)	13.8 (0.54)	8.7 (0.34)	332.9 (13.11)
Average snowfall cm (inches)	37.0 (14.6)	21.5 (8.5)	12.0 (4.7)	3.9 (1.5)	0.9 (0.4)	0.0 (0.0)	0.0 (0.0)	0.0 (0.0)	0.0 (0.0)	5.2 (2.0)	27.4 (10.8)	44.9 (17.7)	152.8 (60.2)
Average precipitation days (≥ 0.2 mm)	13.3	10.0	10.4	11.6	13.4	12.3	9.0	7.5	8.3	10.0	13.9	14.5	134.0
Average rainy days (≥ 0.2 mm)	2.3	3.4	6.7	10.8	13.3	12.3	9.0	7.5	8.3	9.1	6.6	1.7	90.9
Average snowy days (≥ 2 cm)	11.5	7.1	5.0	1.8	0.33	0.0	0.0	0.0	0.0	1.7	8.7	13.4	49.6
Mean monthly sunshine hours	43.8	74.9	114.9	155.8	204.3	200.9	255.2	258.7	187.8	118.3	43.9	38.7	1,697.2
Percentage possible sunshine	16.3	26.3	31.2	37.9	43.0	41.4	52.1	57.9	49.5	35.3	16.0	15.1	35.2
Source: Environment and Climate Change Canada

== See also ==
- Mount Baldy Ski Area
