= Anaconda (poker) =

Anaconda is a variety of stud poker. Other names for this game include "pass the trash", "screw your neighbor", "fuck your neighbor", and "3,2,1 left".

== Play ==
Each player is dealt seven cards. They then each select three cards to be passed to the player on their left. These cards are simply set on the table near their left-most opponent. No players get to see their new three cards until everyone has made a pass. Afterward, the players repeat the process, only with two cards, then again with one card. Players then discard two cards to make their best five-card poker hand.

In this version of the game, up to seven people can play, passing out a total of 49 cards and having three left over.

== Betting ==
A round of betting occurs before the first pass of three cards, then again after every card pass is made. Once players have set their hands, one card at a time is exposed, with a round of betting following each card.

== Variations ==
Anaconda can be changed in many ways, such as:

- Altering the number of starting cards (six cards is common).
- Altering the number of cards passed.
- Altering to whom the cards are passed.
- Incorporating joker cards.
- Including only one betting round & showdown after all passing rounds.
- High-low split.
- Designating certain cards as wild.
- Removing all betting rounds.
