= Granby River =

Location
- Country: Canada
- Province: British Columbia
- Land District: Similkameen Division Yale

Physical characteristics
- Source: Monashee Mountains
- Mouth: Kettle River
  - location: Grand Forks
  - coordinates: 49°2′N 118°26′W
- Length: 105 km (65 mi)
- Discharge
  - location: At Grand Forks
  - average: 30.9 m^{3}/s (1,090 cu ft/s)
  - minimum: 0.227 m^{3}/s (8.0 cu ft/s)
  - maximum: 385 m^{3}/s (13,600 cu ft/s)

The Granby River is a tributary of the Kettle River in British Columbia, Canada, joining the Kettle just north of the Canada–United States border at the town of Grand Forks. The river is approximately 105 kilometres (65 mi) in length and has its origin in the Monashee Mountains to the west of Fauquier on the Arrow Lakes.

Formerly known as the north fork of the Kettle River, the Granby River is named for the Granby Consolidated Mining & Smelting Company, which from 1898 to 1919 operated the Phoenix Mines and a smelter on the east side of the river. The new name was officially adopted in 1915.

== See also ==
- List of rivers of British Columbia
