= Columbia and Western Railway =

Railway in British Columbia, Canada

The Columbia and Western Railway (C&W) was a historic, and initially narrow gauge, railway in southern British Columbia.

== Heinze ownership ==
=== Proposal and planning ===
Fritz Augustus Heinze, who opened a smelter at Butte, Montana, in 1893, was seeking investment opportunities. Attracted by the emerging mining boom on Red Mountain, Rossland, Heinze incorporated the British Columbia Smelting and Refining Company with a commitment to lay trackage between the mines and the Trail smelter. From the smelter, which opened in February 1896, boats could carry the metal concentrate to complete the purification at a refinery. However, his then competitor denied him access to rail transport downriver.

Fearful that further railway competition would capture the ore supply for the smelter, Heinze sought to enlarge the catchment area. He obtained a provincial charter for C&W in April 1896, which authorized a line from the Columbia River west through the metal-rich Boundary District to Penticton on Lake Okanagan. Both ends had riverboat services connecting with Canadian Pacific Railway (CP) lines. Provincial land grants per completed mile were 10,240 acres (4,140 ha) for narrow-gauge trackage or 20,000 acres (8,100 ha) for standard gauge.

=== Construction and operation ===
In November 1895, crews began grading a 13-foot wide railbed from Trail along Trail Creek, and up Red Mountain, the final section having switchbacks. The C&W acquired five locomotives, and purchased used rails for laying the 3 ft (914 mm) narrow gauge line. The first loaded ore train ran in June 1896. In December that year, the three times daily Rossland–Trail passenger service commenced.

In September 1897, C&W opened a Trail–West Robson line, terminating on the opposite shore to the CP Robson docks. Mixed trains soon ran on the route. From here, steamboat and rail could take concentrate from the Trail smelter to Butte for refining. However, the immediate value of his land grants were small, and Heinze lacked the necessary resources to extend the line westward.

== C&W expanded under CP ==
In March 1898, CP bought C&W for $600,000. That June, C&W was incorporated federally. In July 1899, CP completed converting the route to 4 ft 8 1/2 in (1,435 mm) standard gauge. At Rossland, a new station, freight shed, two-stall engine house, and coaling dock were erected. To gain 700 metres (2,300 ft) of elevation in 23 kilometres (14 mi), the line still included up to 4.8 per cent grades and tight curves. Consequently, CP ordered three Shay locomotives, which were delivered between May 1900 and December 1903. In 1910, Baldwin 2-8-0 Consolidations replaced the Shays.

With a provincial government subsidy of $2,500 per kilometre ($4,000/mi), the line was extended westward from West Robson via Grand Forks, reaching Midway by the end of 1899. A ferry provided the link across the Columbia until the rail bridge at Sproat's Landing opened in March 1902.

== Connecting CP lines ==
=== Eastward ===
In May 1891, the Robson–Nelson rail link of the Columbia and Kootenay Railway (C&K) was completed. Between July 1897 and October 1898, CP built westward from Lethbridge via the Crowsnest Pass to the Kootenay Landing terminal. Although the charter specified Nelson, lake boats completed this link until an all-rail route was opened in January 1931. This section accessed the Crowsnest coal deposits.

=== Westward ===
Advancing westward from Midway, the Kettle Valley Railway (KVR) connected to Penticton in October 1914, and Merritt in fall 1915, providing a link to Vancouver, with the more direct route via the Coquihalla Pass opening in July 1916. Although technically, west of Midway is KVR, and east is C&W, the Kettle Valley designation was later ascribed to the whole route.

== Lines contracted ==
When Le Roi mine closed in 1929, big ore trains ceased on the Rossland–Trail section. Highway improvements ended passenger service on this route in 1936. However, the three times a week freight train continued. Frequency progressively reduced until the line was lifted in 1966 west of Warfield.

Passenger service on the KVR ended in 1964. The Penticton–Beaverdell track was abandoned in 1973, and Beaverdell–Midway in 1979. The CP eastward almost to Castlegar was abandoned in 1991. The section from Castlegar to Grand Forks is now a cycling trail. The former grade is now biking and skiing trails.

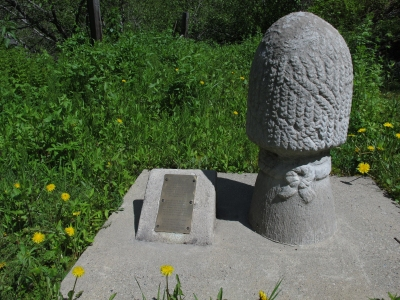
Verigin Memorial beside the trail

Only Warfield–Trail–Hugh Keenleyside Dam remain as live lines.

== Notable isolated points ==
- The one-kilometre long Bulldog Tunnel, 71.3 kilometres (44.3 mi) northeast of Grand Forks, and 39.8 kilometres (24.7 mi) southwest of Castlegar, is the most outstanding man-made feature on the trail.
- Near Farron, the former summit station, which was 59.1 kilometres (36.7 mi) northeast of Grand Forks, and 52.0 kilometres (32.3 mi) southwest of Castlegar, Doukhobor leader Peter (Lordly) Verigin, his secretary, and seven others were killed in October 1924, when a CP passenger car exploded. Although a crime was suspected, no charges eventuated.

== See also ==
- List of defunct Canadian railways
