= Grand Forks, British Columbia =

Grand Forks
- City
- City of Grand Forks
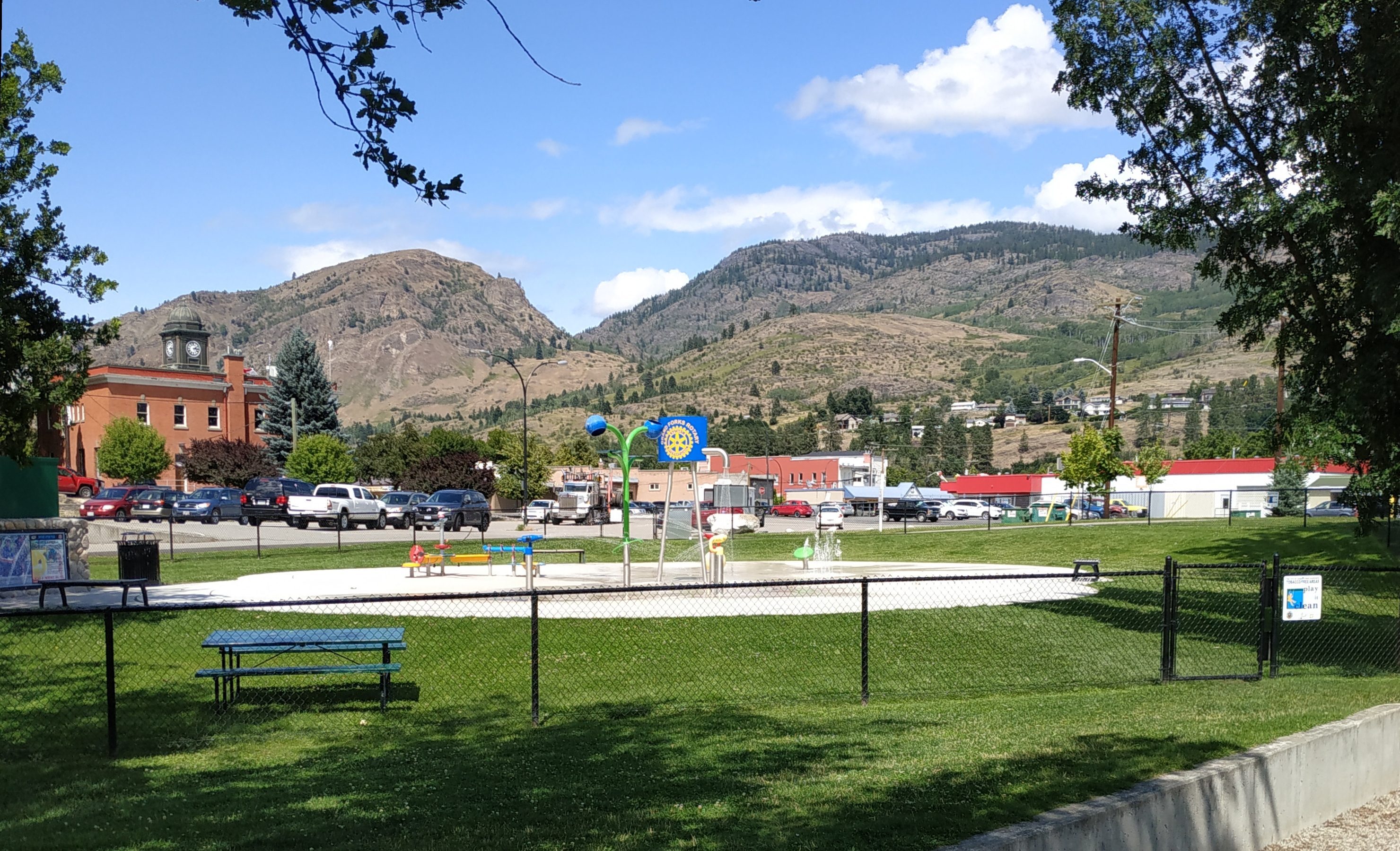
- Motto: Divitiae ex solo (Latin) transl. Riches from the soil
- Location of Grand Forks in British Columbia Grand Forks (Canada)
- Coordinates: 49°02′0″N 118°26′24″W
- Country: Canada
- Province: British Columbia
- Region: Boundary Country
- Regional district: Kootenay Boundary
- Incorporated: 4 March 1897

Government
  - Type: Mayor–council government
  - Governing body: Grand Forks City Council
  - Mayor: Everett Baker

Area
  - Land: 10.37 km^{2} (4.00 sq mi)
- Elevation: 520 m (1,710 ft)

Population (2021)
  - Total: 4,112
  - Density: 396.4/km^{2} (1,027/sq mi)
- Time zone: UTC−07:00 (Pacific Time)
- Postal codes: V0H 1H0 & V0H 3H0
- Area codes: 250, 778, 236, 672
- Website: grandforks.ca

Grand Forks is a city in the Boundary Country of the West Kootenay region of British Columbia, Canada. It is located at the confluence of the Granby and Kettle Rivers, the latter being a tributary of the Columbia River. The city is just north of the Canada–United States border, approximately 500 km (310 mi) from Vancouver and 200 km (120 mi) from Kelowna and 23 km (14 mi) west of the resort area of Christina Lake by road.

== History ==
In 1894, a new settlement at the North Fork bridge, where the rivers join, was called Grand Forks. However, the valley, dominated by copper mining, was called Grand Prairie, and early settlers equally used that name for the town. The city was laid out in 1895 and Grand Forks was established as a city on 15 April 1897. The adjacent City of Columbia was incorporated on 4 May 1899. By 1902, Grand Forks had three railways, lumber mills, a smelter, mines, a post office, a school and a hospital. The railways servicing Grand Forks were the Canadian Pacific Railway's (CP) Columbia and Western Railway, the Kettle River Valley Railway, and the Great Northern Railway (GNR). Grand Forks and Columbia amalgamated in 1903, but only after lengthy disagreements over an acceptable name. In 1907, it was the home of a local branch of the Western Federation of Miners.

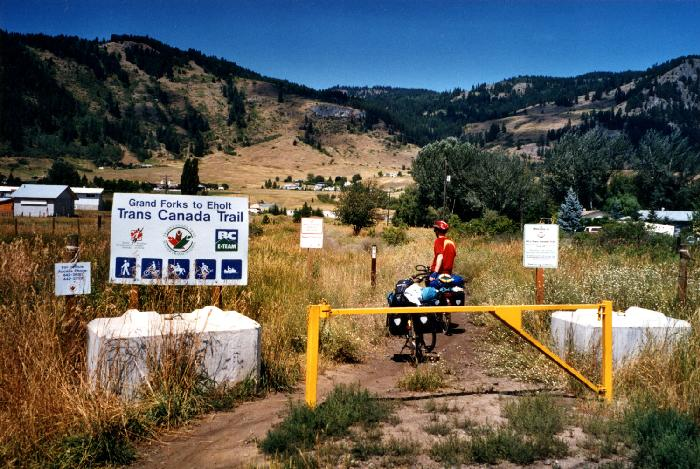
A segment of the Trans-Canada Trail uses a former rail right of way near Grand Forks

In 1908 and 1911, the downtown core was affected by a fire, because of wood-frame buildings and stores. Between the years of 1909 and 1913, a group of pacifist Russian immigrants known as Doukhobors settled in the area because of the fertile farm land. Today, many residents of Grand Forks are descendants of the Doukhobors. In 1991, CP decommissioned their railway line through Grand Forks, and the former right-of-way became part of the Trans Canada Trail. The Kettle Falls International Railway, the only remaining operator, which services the former GN route, plans to decommission the line north of Laurier, Washington by 2023. Grand Forks has been promoting industrial growth, which has been declining since the early 2000s. Over time, Grand Forks has gradually expanded in population and now has 4,049 residents within its city limits. The greater rural area, (Area D of the Regional District of Kootenay-Boundary), has another ~3,500 residents.

In May 2018 Grand Forks, and the Boundary region as a whole, were affected by flooding of the Kettle and Granby Rivers. Low-lying areas, including part of the downtown core, saw extensive damage. The Ruckle neighborhood was most affected. The federal government is expected to buy out all the homes in North Ruckle and turn the area back into a natural flood plain.

== Demographics ==
Canada census – Grand Forks community profile

	2021	2016	2011
Population	4,112 (+1.6% from 2016)	4,049 (1.6% from 2011)	3,985 (-1.3% from 2006)
Land area	10.37 km^{2} (4.00 sq mi)	10.43 km^{2} (4.03 sq mi)	10.43 km^{2} (4.03 sq mi)
Population density	396.4/km^{2} (1,027/sq mi)	388.1/km^{2} (1,005/sq mi)	382.0/km^{2} (989/sq mi)
Median age	56.0 (M: 54.0, F: 57.6)	55.1 (M: 53.6, F: 56.4)	52.3 (M: 50.6, F: 53.8)
Private dwellings	1,969 (total) 1,871 (occupied)	1,944 (total)	1,918 (total)
Median household income	$61,600	$26,395

References: 2021 2016 2011

In the 2021 Census of Population conducted by Statistics Canada, Grand Forks had a population of 4,112 living in 1,871 of its 1,969 total private dwellings, a change of 1.6% from its 2016 population of 4,049. With a land area of 10.37 km^{2} (4.00 sq mi), it had a population density of 396.5/km^{2} (1,027.0/sq mi) in 2021.

Historical population

Year	Pop.	±%
1891	700	—
1901	1,012	+44.6%
1911	1,577	+55.8%
1921	1,469	−6.8%
1931	1,298	−11.6%
1941	1,259	−3.0%
1951	1,646	+30.7%

Year	Pop.	±%
1956	1,995	+21.2%
1961	2,347	+17.6%
1966	2,556	+8.9%
1971	3,173	+24.1%
1976	3,096	−2.4%
1981	3,486	+12.6%
1986	3,282	−5.9%

Year	Pop.	±%
1991	3,610	+10.0%
1996	3,994	+10.6%
2001	4,054	+1.5%
2006	4,036	−0.4%
2011	3,985	−1.3%
2016	4,049	+1.6%
2021	4,112	+1.6%

Source: Statistics Canada

=== Ethnicity ===
Panethnic groups in the City of Grand Forks (1986−2021)
Panethnic group	2021		2016		2011		2006		2001		1996		1991		1986	
Panethnic group	Pop.	%	Pop.	%	Pop.	%	Pop.	%	Pop.	%	Pop.	%	Pop.	%	Pop.	%
European (Note: Statistic includes all persons that did not make up part of a visible minority or an indigenous identity.)	3,410	87.66%	3,420	89.41%	3,280	85.64%	3,710	94.52%	3,605	91.61%	3,750	96.4%	3,230	92.02%	3,025	94.98%
Indigenous	235	6.04%	260	6.8%	365	9.53%	125	3.18%	190	4.83%	35	0.9%	180	5.13%	85	2.67%
South Asian	80	2.06%	40	1.05%	80	2.09%	35	0.89%	45	1.14%	50	1.29%	10	0.28%	30	0.94%
East Asian (Note: Statistic includes total responses of "Chinese", "Korean", and "Japanese" under visible minority section on census.)	75	1.93%	25	0.65%	0	0%	15	0.38%	35	0.89%	35	0.9%	40	1.14%	35	1.1%
Southeast Asian (Note: Statistic includes total responses of "Filipino" and "Southeast Asian" under visible minority section on census.)	45	1.16%	50	1.31%	40	1.04%	20	0.51%	60	1.52%	10	0.26%	30	0.85%	5	0.16%
African	15	0.39%	20	0.52%	0	0%	10	0.25%	0	0%	0	0%	0	0%	0	0%
Latin American	10	0.26%	10	0.26%	0	0%	0	0%	10	0.25%	10	0.26%	10	0.28%	0	0%
Middle Eastern (Note: Statistic includes total responses of "West Asian" and "Arab" under visible minority section on census.)	0	0%	0	0%	0	0%	0	0%	0	0%	0	0%	10	0.28%	5	0.16%
Other/multiracial (Note: Statistic includes total responses of "Visible minority, n.i.e." and "Multiple visible minorities" under visible minority section on census.)	0	0%	10	0.26%	0	0%	10	0.25%	0	0%	0	0%	—N/a	—N/a	—N/a	—N/a
Total responses	3,890	94.6%	3,825	94.47%	3,830	96.11%	3,925	97.25%	3,935	97.06%	3,890	97.4%	3,510	97.23%	3,185	97.04%
Total population	4,112	100%	4,049	100%	3,985	100%	4,036	100%	4,054	100%	3,994	100%	3,610	100%	3,282	100%
Note: Totals greater than 100% due to multiple origin responses.

=== Religion ===
According to the 2021 census, religious groups in Grand Forks included:

- Irreligion (2,390 persons or 61.4%)
- Christianity (1,315 persons or 33.8%)
- Sikhism (40 persons or 1.0%)
- Hinduism (30 persons or 0.8%)
- Buddhism (20 persons or 0.5%)
- Islam (10 persons or 0.3%)
- Other (75 persons or 1.9%)

== Economy ==
Major industries in Grand Forks are limited and have become smaller over the past decade with the loss of major industries, such as Pope & Talbot, the industries in Grand Forks are logging, agriculture, rock wool manufacturing, fabrication (metal) and tourism. The city is close to the site of the former Phoenix copper mine, which closed in 1935. The slag piles on the Granby River just outside town are remnants of a large copper smelting operation. The slag from the piles at the north end of town is owned by Pacific Abrasives, who sells it to the US Navy and ships it by rail to San Diego, California, to use for sandblasting ships. The sawmill in Grand Forks is operated by Interfor (formerly Pope and Talbot) and ships forest products into the United States via rail.

The Grand Forks Boundary Bulletin was a weekly newspaper in Grand Forks. It was published on Mondays with a circulation of 5,410. The paper is no longer in operation.

Tourism has declined in Grand Forks due to a lack of tourist attractions. However, it is in close proximity to the Okanagan, which is a large tourist destination. Christina Lake, which is 20 minutes east of Grand Forks, is home to many resorts and summer homes and its year round population of 1,000 increases to 6,000 during the summer.

== Government ==
The City of Grand Forks has a seven-person elected council, with Everett Baker currently serving as mayor. The incumbent councillors are: Zak Eburne-Stoodley, Neil Krog, Christine Thompson, David Mark, Deborah Lafleur and Rod Zielinski. Provincially, Grand Forks is located in the constituency of Boundary-Similkameen, where it is represented by MLA Donegal Wilson (BC Conservative Party), who defeated the NDP incumbent, Roly Russell in this year's Provincial Election, and federally it is located in the South Okanagan—West Kootenay riding and represented by MP Richard Cannings.

== Transportation ==
The short-line Grand Forks Railway is based out of Grand Forks. The company owns 3.7 mi (6.0 km) of track, which connects Roxul and Interfor with the Grand Forks Junction at the south end of town. It is the shortest railway in Canada. Train cars then get sent to the United States via the Kettle Falls International Railway.

The city is also served by the Grand Forks Airport.

== Climate ==
Grand Forks experiences a humid continental climate (Köppen climate classification Dfb) with a similar climate to the Okanagan Valley to the west. However, the Boundary area usually receives slightly colder and snowier winters and slightly hotter summer temperatures, due to its location away from large lakes. Daytime highs during the summer often top 30 °C (86 °F) and surpass 40 °C (104 °F) at least once every few years. Night temperatures often fall rapidly in summer, and frost is rare but not unheard of in June or September. Winter temperatures are moderately (seldom severely) cold, but definitely mild by Canadian standards. Some years may see only a few light snowfalls and intermittent snow cover, whereas others receive several large snowstorms and snow cover from December to March. Precipitation is higher than many other drier Southern Interior locations, but still fairly low.

The primary vegetation in the Grand Forks area is typical of the Southern BC dry belt. Sagebrush, bunchgrass, prickly pear cactus, arrowleaf balsamroot, ponderosa pine and douglas-fir dominate the valley bottom and south facing slopes. More mountainous species such as bearberry, lodgepole pine, western larch, Engelmann spruce, western red cedar and black cottonwood can be found along the Kettle and Granby Rivers and on north facing slopes.

Though an official weather station no longer exists in Grand Forks, unconfirmed reports suggest the highest temperature ever recorded was in excess of 45 °C (113 °F), possibly as high as 48, on 29 June 2021, during the 2021 Western North America heat wave

Climate data for Grand Forks
Month	Jan	Feb	Mar	Apr	May	Jun	Jul	Aug	Sep	Oct	Nov	Dec	Year
Record high °C (°F)	16.1 (61.0)	19.4 (66.9)	24.0 (75.2)	31.7 (89.1)	36.1 (97.0)	45.0 (113.0)	42.2 (108.0)	39.4 (102.9)	36.7 (98.1)	30.0 (86.0)	18.9 (66.0)	25.0 (77.0)	45.0 (113.0)
Mean daily maximum °C (°F)	−0.5 (31.1)	3.2 (37.8)	10.1 (50.2)	15.7 (60.3)	20.4 (68.7)	24.1 (75.4)	28.4 (83.1)	28.7 (83.7)	23.1 (73.6)	13.8 (56.8)	4.3 (39.7)	−1.3 (29.7)	14.2 (57.6)
Daily mean °C (°F)	−3.6 (25.5)	−1.2 (29.8)	4.3 (39.7)	8.8 (47.8)	13.2 (55.8)	16.6 (61.9)	19.9 (67.8)	19.7 (67.5)	14.6 (58.3)	7.5 (45.5)	1.0 (33.8)	−4.2 (24.4)	8.0 (46.4)
Mean daily minimum °C (°F)	−6.7 (19.9)	−5.6 (21.9)	−1.6 (29.1)	1.8 (35.2)	5.9 (42.6)	9.2 (48.6)	11.3 (52.3)	10.6 (51.1)	6.1 (43.0)	1.1 (34.0)	−2.4 (27.7)	−7.2 (19.0)	1.9 (35.4)
Record low °C (°F)	−38.9 (−38.0)	−34.4 (−29.9)	−22.8 (−9.0)	−8.3 (17.1)	−8.3 (17.1)	−1.7 (28.9)	1.1 (34.0)	0.0 (32.0)	−6.1 (21.0)	−14.0 (6.8)	−29.0 (−20.2)	−37.8 (−36.0)	−38.9 (−38.0)
Average precipitation mm (inches)	53.1 (2.09)	32.8 (1.29)	35.6 (1.40)	44.9 (1.77)	60.2 (2.37)	62.5 (2.46)	39.3 (1.55)	29.1 (1.15)	28.8 (1.13)	34.7 (1.37)	55.4 (2.18)	58.1 (2.29)	534.3 (21.04)
Average rainfall mm (inches)	16.6 (0.65)	18.3 (0.72)	29.6 (1.17)	44.2 (1.74)	60.1 (2.37)	62.5 (2.46)	39.3 (1.55)	29.1 (1.15)	28.8 (1.13)	33.9 (1.33)	33.3 (1.31)	14.5 (0.57)	410.3 (16.15)
Average snowfall cm (inches)	36.5 (14.4)	14.5 (5.7)	5.9 (2.3)	0.7 (0.3)	0.0 (0.0)	0.0 (0.0)	0.0 (0.0)	0.0 (0.0)	0.0 (0.0)	0.8 (0.3)	22.1 (8.7)	43.6 (17.2)	124.1 (48.9)
Average precipitation days (≥ 0.2 mm)	13.7	10.0	12.2	12.5	14.5	13.4	8.7	7.3	7.3	10.4	14.9	13.4	138.2
Average rainy days (≥ 0.2 mm)	5.9	6.8	10.9	12.4	14.5	13.4	8.7	7.3	7.3	10.3	10.6	3.8	111.8
Average snowy days (≥ 0.2 cm)	8.9	4.3	1.9	0.3	0.0	0.0	0.0	0.0	0.0	0.3	5.5	10.4	31.5

== Sports ==
Club	League	Sport	Venue	
Grand Forks Border Bruins	KIJHL	Ice Hockey	Jack Goddard Memorial Arena	1969
Grand Forks Piranhas	BCSSA	Competitive Swimming	Grand Forks Aquatic Center	1993

== Education ==
Schools in the region are operated by School District 51 Boundary which has its main office in Grand Forks and also serves Midway, Greenwood, Beaverdell, and Rock Creek.

There are two elementary (Dr. D. A. Perley Elementary School, and John A. Hutton Elementary School) and one secondary school (Grand Forks Secondary School). The District also operates an alternate learning centre in Grand Forks (Walker Development Centre).

Selkirk College, based in Castlegar, has a community campus in Grand Forks. Established in 1966, Selkirk College is BC's oldest community college. Students that study in Grand Forks have access to a variety of courses at both the High School and College level.

== Notable people ==
- Ron Areshenkoff
- Vasily Balabanov
- Bill Barlee (1932–2012), politician, minister of small business, tourism and culture of British Columbia.
- Martin Burrell (1858–1938), politician, member of the Canadian Parliament.
- Xiomara De Oliver (born 1967), painter.
- Edward Dmytryk (1908–1999), Hollywood film director.
- John F. Helliwell, economist.
- Chris Loseth
- Ted Reynolds
- Brian Taylor

== Freedom of the City ==
The following people and military units have received the Freedom of the City of Grand Forks.

Individuals:

- D.C. Manly: 3 Jan 1967
- O.O. Stephenson: 3 Jan 1967
- A.W. Downey: 3 Jan 1967
- Marjorie Reynolds: May 1967
- Leo Mills: July 1971
- Jim Lorimer
- Stanley Orriss: 1979
- Lois Haggen: 1980
- Erna Gobbett: 1985
- Emerson Reid
- Yasugi (Sugi) Sugimoto: 1997
- Ray Orser: 1997
- Helen Campbell: April 1987
- Jim and Alice Glanville: 15 Apr 1998
- John Verigin Sr.: May 1999
- Richard Reid: 2003
- 44th Field Engineers Squadron: 22 Oct 2005
- Jock and Betty Ann McKay 14 Sept 2011
- Madeleine McDougall: 13 Jan 2012
- Eli and Dorothy Popoff: September 2014
- Les Johnson: 20 July 2020
- Larry Seminoff: 15 July 2022
- Gerry Foster: 15 July 2022

== See also ==
- Hardy Mountain Doukhobor Village
- Grand Forks Gazette
- Vancouver, Victoria and Eastern Railway
- Columbia and Western Railway
- Cascade City, British Columbia
