= Greenwood, British Columbia =

Greenwood
- City
- The Corporation of the City of Greenwood

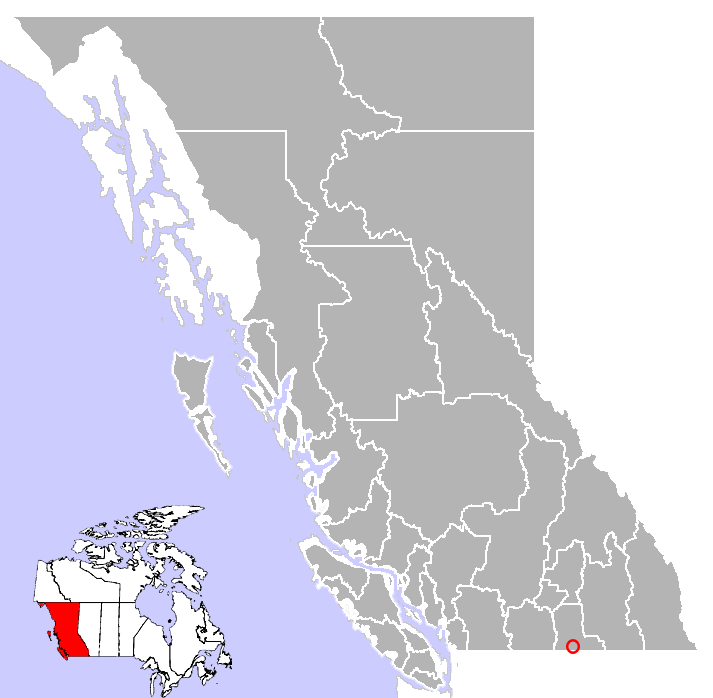
- Location of Greenwood in British Columbia
- Coordinates: 49°05′24″N 118°40′39″W
- Country: Canada
- Province: British Columbia
- Region: Boundary Country
- Regional district: Kootenay Boundary
- Incorporated: 1897

Government
  - Mayor: John Bolt
  - Council: Jessica McLean, Gerry Shaw, Clint Huisman, Jim Nathorst

Area
  - Total: 2.52 km^{2} (0.97 sq mi)
- Elevation: 770 m (2,530 ft)

Population (2021)
  - Total: 702
  - Density: 279/km^{2} (721/sq mi)
- Time zone: UTC−07:00 (PT)
- Zip code: V0H 1J0
- Area codes: 250, 778, 236, 672
- Highways: 3
- Website: greenwoodcity.com

Greenwood (2021 population 702) is a city in south central British Columbia. It was incorporated in 1897 and was formerly one of the principal cities of the Boundary Country smelting and mining district. It was incorporated as a city originally and has retained that title despite the population decline following the closure of the area's industries.

The town is served by Greenwood Elementary School which covers grades from K-7. Following grade 7 local students attend Boundary Central Secondary School in nearby Midway.

In 1942, 1,200 Japanese Canadians were sent to Greenwood as part of the Japanese Canadian internment. Among those interned at Greenwood were Isamu and Fumiko Kariya and their son Yasi, the grandparents and uncle of NHL star and Hockey Hall of Fame member Paul Kariya; his father Tetsuhiko (T.K.) was born in internment.

== History ==
In 1886 several mining claims had been staked in a narrow gulch ten miles north of the mouth of Boundary Creek. The ore was high in copper. Ten years later more claims had been staked in the area. These claims gave rise to the city of Greenwood. In 1895 a merchant named Robert Wood erected a log store and named the region Greenwood.

By 1896 there were three hotels, a general store, a livery stable, two assay offices, a mining broker, an opera house, and a dozen other establishments. Greenwood became an incorporated city in 1897. The population climbed to 3,000 by 1899 and a railway called the Columbia and Western Railway reached Greenwood from the east. In 1899 a fire struck Greenwood which gutted several businesses.

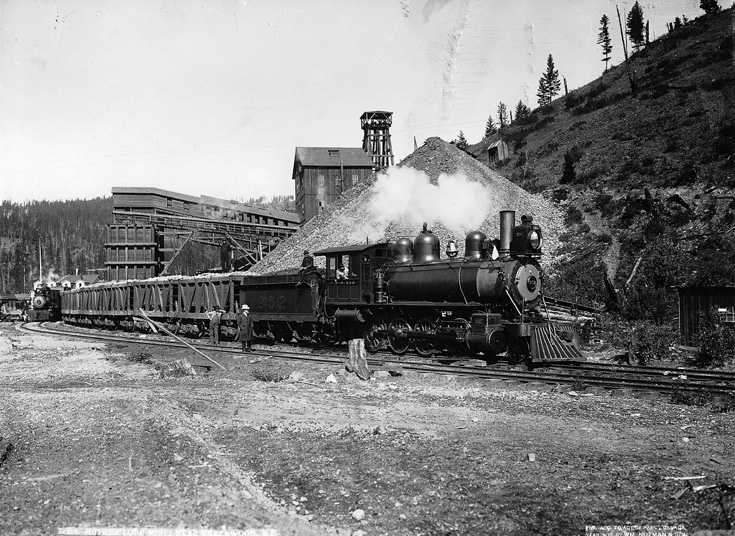
Trains at the Mother Lode Mine near Greenwood, 1903

The BC Copper Company smelter began operation in 1901, servicing ore from the Mother Lode Mine and other mines in the area. Greenwood was the supply center for surrounding camps such as Providence, Copper, Deadwood, Wellington, Central, Skylark and others. The city became the seat of government for the Boundary with one hundred firms in the business district. Greenwood had a newspaper called the "Times" by 1906 another paper called the "Greenwood Ledge".

By 1910 the boom had passed and Greenwood's population was 1,500. At the end of World War I, the demand for copper dropped, and by 1918 the copper market was dead, and the smelter in Greenwood lay idle. The following year it closed down permanently. The collapse of the smelters led to close of mines around the vicinity of Greenwood. Greenwood was on the decline after this period.

On May 9, 2024 a fire burnt down the 123-year-old St. Judes Anglican Church.

Lost mines

Close to Greenwood is the location of Jolly Jack's Lost Mine. Local historian Bill Barlee wrote about Jolly Jack's lost mine. The location of the mine was never found. The Greenwood local museum has written records of Jolly Jack.

Henry Morgan's lost mine is located somewhere around Greenwood. The mine is thought to have been at the headwaters of Boundary Creek, although it has never been found. Local historian Garnet Basque has written about Morgan's lost mine.

== Demographics ==
Historical population
Year	Pop.	±%
1891	1,000	—
1901	1,359	+35.9%
1911	778	−42.8%
1921	371	−52.3%
1931	171	−53.9%
1941	363	+112.3%
1951	809	+122.9%
1956	815	+0.7%
1961	932	+14.4%
1966	911	−2.3%
1971	868	−4.7%
1976	931	+7.3%
1981	856	−8.1%
1986	767	−10.4%
1991	725	−5.5%
1996	784	+8.1%
2001	666	−15.1%
2006	625	−6.2%
2011	708	+13.3%
2016	665	−6.1%
2021	702	+5.6%
Sources: Statistics Canada

In the 2021 Census of Population conducted by Statistics Canada, Greenwood had a population of 702 living in 375 of its 448 total private dwellings, a change of 5.6% from its 2016 population of 665. With a land area of 2.42 km^{2} (0.93 sq mi), it had a population density of 290.1/km^{2} (751.3/sq mi) in 2021.

== Arts and culture ==
Greenwood was featured on the historical television series Gold Trails and Ghost Towns, Season 2, Episode 1. Greenwood was one of the filming locations for the theatrical film Snow Falling on Cedars. It was also featured as a town named after the fictional logging magnate of Everett Greenwood in the 2019 Michael Christie novel Greenwood.

== See also ==
- Boundary Creek Times
- List of francophone communities in British Columbia
