= Kettle River (Columbia River tributary) =

River in Canada and the United States

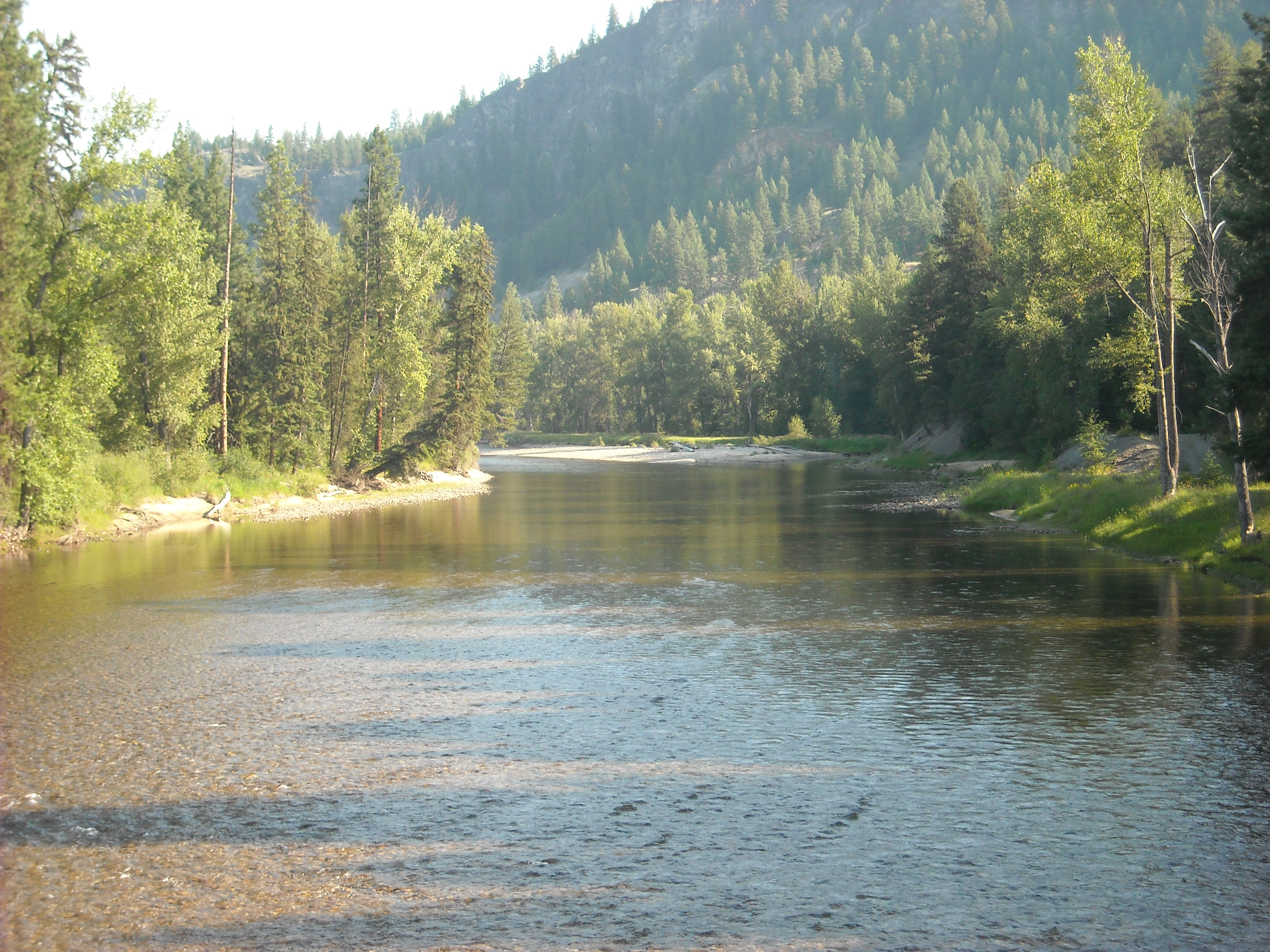
- Kettle River from railway trestle

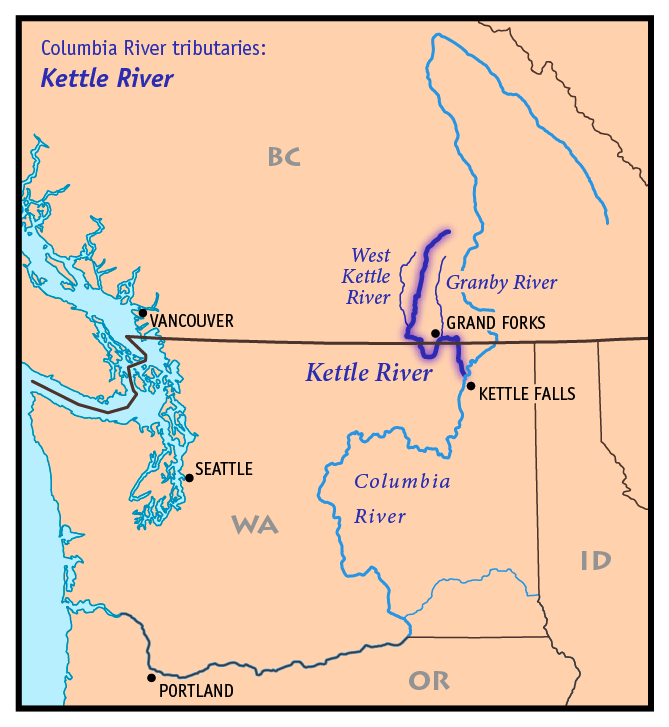
- Map of the Kettle River and its two main tributaries

Location
- Country: United States, Canada
- State: Washington
- Province: British Columbia
- City: Grand Forks, BC, Kettle Falls, WA

Physical characteristics
- Source: Holmes Lake
  - location: British Columbia, Canada 50°06′55″N 118°18′43″W
  - coordinates: 50°06′55″N 118°18′43″W
- Mouth: Columbia River
  - location: Franklin D. Roosevelt Lake, Washington (state)
  - coordinates: 48°40′22″N 118°6′50″W
  - elevation: 1,500 ft (460 m)
- Length: 175 mi (282 km)
- Basin size: 4,200 sq mi (11,000 km^{2})
- Discharge
  - location: Laurier, WA
  - average: 2,906 cu ft/s (82.3 m^{3}/s)
  - minimum: 70 cu ft/s (2.0 m^{3}/s)
  - maximum: 35,000 cu ft/s (990 m^{3}/s)

Basin features
- Tributaries
  - left: Granby River
  - right: West Kettle River, Rock Creek, Boundary Creek

The Kettle River is a 281-kilometre (175 mi) tributary of the Columbia River, encompassing a 10,877-square-kilometre (4,200 sq mi) drainage basin, of which 8,228 square kilometres (3,177 sq mi) are in southern British Columbia, Canada and 2,649 square kilometres (1,023 sq mi) in northeastern Washington, US.

== Name ==
The indigenous name of the river in the Okanagan language is nxʷyaʔłpítkʷ (Ne-hoi-al-pit-kwu.) Although British officials used this name, Kettle River was in popular use by 1860. The most likely name origin is from the Kettle Falls, which early explorers called "La Chaudiére" ("The Boiler"), because of the effervescent water. A possible alternative is the round holes, shaped like cauldrons, which water had hollowed out in the rocks.

== Course ==
From its source at the outlet of Holmes Lake in the Monashee Mountains of British Columbia, the Kettle River flows south to Midway, British Columbia. Along the way it is joined by many tributaries, most notably the West Kettle River. Below Midway, the river loops south, crossing the Canada–US border into the United States, through Ferry County, Washington, before flowing north back into Canada, passing by Grand Forks, British Columbia, where the Granby River joins. After flowing east for about 10 miles (16 km), the river turns south again, just south of Christina Lake, entering the United States again. It then flows south, forming part of the Ferry-Stevens County line, before joining the Columbia River near Kettle Falls, Washington. The Columbia River at this point is a large reservoir impounded behind Grand Coulee Dam, called Lake Roosevelt. The Kettle enters the lake at the Columbia's river mile 706. The Kettle River is undammed, making it one of the few rivers with constant flow in the Pacific Northwest.

== Natural history ==
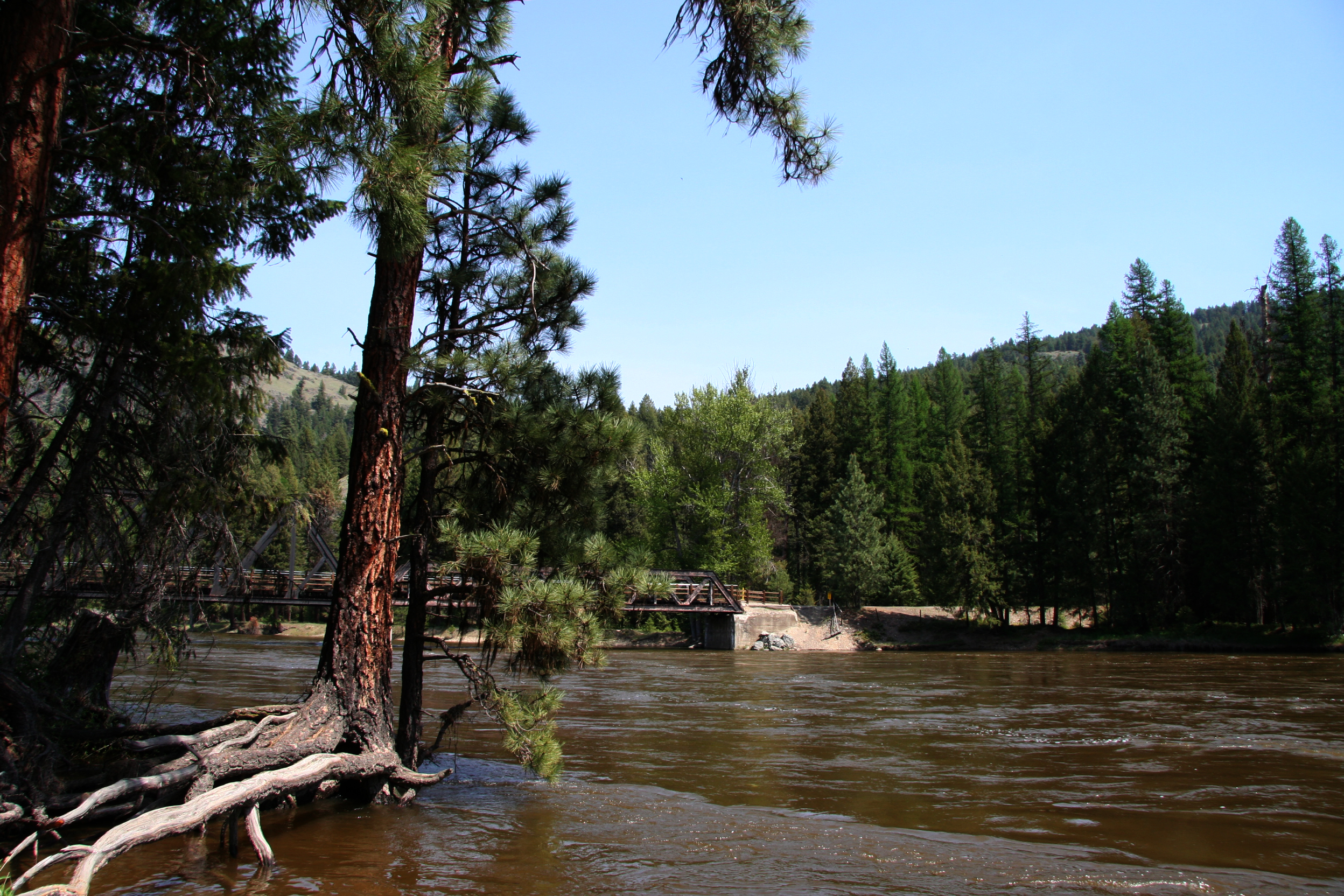
The Kettle River in its course between the Monashee Mountains and Okanagan Highland

The Kettle River once supported salmon and other anadromous fish. The construction of Grand Coulee Dam, along with Chief Joseph Dam, blocked fish migration up the Columbia and its upper tributaries, including the Kettle River. In addition, Grand Coulee Dam's reservoir, Lake Roosevelt, flooded traditional fishery sites, including Kettle Falls near the mouth of the Kettle River.

== See also ==
- Tributaries of the Columbia River
- List of rivers of British Columbia
- List of rivers in Washington
- Kettle River Range
