= Boundary Country =

Region of British Columbia, Canada, along the U.S.–Canada border

The Boundary Country is a historical designation for a district in southern British Columbia lying, as its name suggests, along the boundary between Canada and the United States. It lies to the east of the southern Okanagan Valley and to the west of the West Kootenay. It is often included in descriptions of both of those regions but historically has been considered a separate region. Originally inclusive of the South Okanagan towns of Osoyoos and Oliver, today the term continues in use to refer to the valleys of the Kettle, West Kettle, and Granby Rivers and of Boundary and Rock Creeks and that of Christina Lake and of their various tributaries, all draining the south slope of the Monashee Mountains. The term Boundary District as well as the term Boundary Country can both refer to the local mining division of the British Columbia Ministry of Mines, Energy and Petroleum Resources.

== Geography ==
The Boundary Country comprises the lower valleys of the West Kettle and Kettle Rivers and the lower Granby River. The Granby and Kettle converge just north of the border at Grand Forks, the largest city and heart of the Boundary. The Kettle crosses the border at the town of Midway, near the confluence of the Kettle and Boundary Creek, which flows out of the galena-rich Boundary Creek basin where the city of Greenwood is located. A small pass connects between the Kettle River basin and that of the Granby, where the town of Grand Forks lies immediately upon the border, and just east of which is the resort community of Christina Lake.

The principal community of the West Boundary area is Rock Creek, which is located at the western end of the region where the creek of the same name meets the Kettle River. The area is rich with the sites of former towns and cities, most long defunct and nearly disappeared, although the names Kettle Valley, Boundary Falls, Anaconda, Phoenix and Eholt still appear on the map.

== History ==
The Boundary Country was part of the traditional territory of the Sinixt, a First Nations people of the Interior Salish language group (also known as "Arrow Lakes" Indians). Declared "extinct" as a band for purposes of the Indian Act but not as a tribal group by the government of Canada in the 1950s. Sinixt families still reside in the region as well as neighbouring Washington.

American miners poured across the border in 1859 during the Rock Creek Gold Rush. In subsequent years followed the construction of the Dewdney Trail and, later on, discovery and industrialization of the area's rich mineral resources, notably copper. Copper provided the industrial base for the development of the region, with many large mines and smelters and associated mining camps and communities. These were large enough that there were two provincial electoral seats in the area Greenwood and Grand Forks. Several towns from this era have since disappeared or vanished beyond recognition, among them Eholt, Deadwood, Cascade Falls and Phoenix.

== Political organization ==
Federally, the Boundary Country is now part of the South Okanagan—West Kootenay electoral district. Historically it was originally part of the Yale riding (1871-1952) and afterwards had been in the Okanagan Boundary (1952-1966), the Okanagan—Kootenay (1966-1968), and the British Columbia Southern Interior (1997-2015) ridings.

The Boundary Country is currently part of the Boundary-Similkameen provincial electoral district. Previously it had been in the West Kootenay-Boundary (2001-2009), Okanagan-Boundary (1991-1996) ridings, Boundary-Similkameen (1963-1991), and Grand Forks-Greenwood ridings (1924-1963). From 1903 to 1924 it was represented by two ridings, Greenwood and Grand Forks, both of which had been created from the redistribution of the older West Kootenay (south riding) (1894 only) and prior to that West Kootenay riding (1890 only). Originally it was part of the Kootenay provincial electoral district.

The Boundary Country is currently part of the Kootenay Boundary Regional District.

== Climate ==
Rock Creek, Midway, Grand Forks, Westbridge and Christina Lake enjoy a semi-arid climate with fairly low precipitation, mild winters and hot summers. Higher elevation communities such as Greenwood, Beaverdell, Carmi, Christian Valley and Bridesville can also be considered semi-arid, but receive cooler temperatures and more precipitation, particularly snow. The Boundary Country as a whole shares a similar climate to the Okanagan Valley just to the West.

== Municipalities ==
The largest city in the region is Grand Forks with a city population of almost 4,000 and an area population of about 10,000. The incorporated municipalities in the Boundary Country are the cities of Grand Forks and Greenwood and village of Midway. The unincorporated communities are Bridesville, Rock Creek, Westbridge, Christian Valley, Beaverdell, Carmi, Kettle Valley, Anaconda, Christina Lake and Cascade. During the area's smelting and railway heyday, Phoenix was also incorporated as a city but only Greenwood and Grand Forks retain their city status, with Greenwood proudly retaining the status of "Canada's Smallest City".
