= Coquihalla railway link =

The Coquihalla railway link, operated by the Kettle Valley Railway (KV), a Canadian Pacific Railway (CP) subsidiary, connected the Coquihalla Summit and Hope in southwestern British Columbia. This standard gauge trackage, which followed the Coquihalla River through the North Cascades, formed the greater part of the KV Coquihalla Subdivision.

== Proposals and planning ==
During surveys for a transcontinental railway route in the 1870s, Sandford Fleming estimated 10 kilometres (6 mi) of aggregate tunnelling and severe gradients would be required for a Coquihalla route.

When surveying alternative east–west routes over the passes (namely Allison (longest), Coquihalla, and Railroad (shortest)) in 1902, Edgar Dewdney rejected all of them in favour of rails via Spences Bridge. Around 1900, the Columbia and Western Railway (C&W), a CP subsidiary, had projected a line to connect Princeton and Penticton via Keremeos, but this never eventuated. CP's Thomas Shaughnessy claimed he would build a direct Kootenays to the coast line, but the chosen route was more suited to local traffic. Chief engineer Andrew McCulloch was not given the freedom to select the optimal route.

By 1910, the CP and Great Northern Railway (GN), had each surveyed routes through the Coquihalla canyon. GN's James J. Hill planned a 13-kilometre (8 mi) tunnel under the mountain between Tulameen and Portia, because negotiating Railroad Pass without a tunnel was impractical. Exiting on the east side of the Coquihalla River, this tunnel would not have interfered with earlier and later trails and roads. Extreme weather proved to make the upper Coquihalla canyon extremely expensive to maintain. Such a tunnel would not only protect against these weather-related issues but would be 48 kilometres (30 mi) shorter. After calling for tenders, GN ultimately chose the longer Coquihalla Pass route instead.

The CP route via Osprey Lake (Bankeir) and Brookmere was not optimal. A sounder choice would have been southwest to the Similkameen River and northwest to a Railroad Pass tunnel. To bring into being this tunnel option, a compromise between CP and GN should have been forced upon both parties earlier. Instead, the CP and GN conflicts over the narrow Coquihalla right-of-way triggered years of legal claims. In November 1913, they signed the Coquihalla Agreement, whereby CP would build and maintain the Coquihalla line, but GN would receive running rights. In early 1914, they signed the Tulameen Agreement, whereby GN would be responsible for Princeton–Brookmere, upon which CP would have running rights.

In 1937, John Sullivan wrote to McCulloch, both retired senior CP employees, stating, "Of all the blunders in railway building history the CPR's southern British Columbia rail line (namely the KV) is the greatest".

== Construction ==
In harsh weather, scree forms an unstable building base. In the upper canyon, the railbed lay at the transition from semi-solid rock to scree. The latter provided the outer part of the rail bed, while the inner part was cut from the rock face. Construction crews returning in spring 1916 needed first to repair much of the 1915 construction work that had been destroyed by slides over the winter.

The maximum gradient was 2.2 per cent. Construction costs were $136,000 per mile, five times the average cost for Canadian railways in 1913. One particular mile in the upper canyon cost $300,000, being one of the most expensive miles of railway built up to that time. The provincial construction subsidy was $10,000 per mile.

The last spike on the KV was driven in July 1916 east of the tunnel adjacent to the Ladner Creek bridge.

== Operation and maintenance ==
Regular passenger service began at the end of July 1916. Eastbound trains took on pusher engines at Hope.

Washouts and slides closed the Coquihalla during December 1917–May 1918, January–May 1921, 2 to 4 months in 1930s, and 6 months in 1938–39. During World War II, Japanese Canadians from the Tashme Incarceration Camp formed a bridge and building maintenance gang. Having barely recovered from the damage of the previous winter, the line again closed in fall 1949.

In 1926, CP was making plans to abandon the Coquihalla route, following a series of slides. Even if an abandonment received government approval, CP might have been required to return government construction subsidies and would also forfeit the annual fee paid by GN. When slides and washouts in 1932 resurrected thoughts of abandonment, the ongoing GN payments were the deciding factor. Severe weather damage in early 1939 raised concerns again, but the likelihood of an escalating war in Europe, which would increase rail traffic, instead prompted extensive upgrades.

For a line it had never commercially used, GN had paid CP $150,000 annually since 1916, and CP had paid GN $60,000 annually for actual use. In 1944–45, to end such payments, GN paid $4,500,000 to CP to terminate the Coquihalla Agreement. In turn, CP paid GN $1,500,000 to terminate the Tulameen Agreement and acquired that leg.

During World War II, bulldozers were introduced for snow clearing, which proved superior to the prior combination of rotary and wedge plows. In addition, substandard snowsheds were removed rather than replaced, resulting in 10 of the original 15 sheds being demolished over an eight-year period.

Not a single passenger was killed during the lifetime of the railway. A speeder checking for slides and washouts preceded every passenger train through the Coquihalla Pass. In winter, a plow train preceded the speeder. In addition, foot patrols checked the whole route every day.

In 1952, passenger train schedules were changed by 12 hours, meaning the Coquihalla was travelled during daylight. In 1954, the passenger schedule reverted to night time travel through the area. After the November 1959 slides and washouts in the vicinity of Jessica, passenger service through the Coquihalla permanently ceased that month.

== Timetables ==
CP Train Timetables (Regular stop or Flag stop)
	Mile	1916	1919	1929	1932	1935	1939	1943	1948	1954	1959
Hope	162.7	Reg.	Reg.	Reg.	Reg.	Reg.	^{a}	Reg.	Reg	Reg.	Reg.
CNR Crossing	162.2	Flag					^{a}				
Othello	157.2	Flag	Flag		Flag	Flag	^{a}	Flag	Flag	Flag	Flag
Lear	153.3	Flag	Flag		Flag	Flag	^{a}	Flag	Flag	Flag	Flag
Jessica	148.2	Both	Reg.		Flag	Flag	^{a}	Flag	Flag	Flag	Flag
Aurum	146.7					Flag	^{a}	Flag			
Portia	142.6	Flag	Flag	Reg.	Reg.	Reg.	^{a}	Both	Both	Flag	Flag
Iago	137.9	Flag	Flag		Flag	Flag	^{a}	Flag	Flag	Flag	Flag
Romeo	132.2	Flag	Flag		Flag	Flag	^{a}	Flag	Flag	Flag	Flag
Coquihalla	126.1	Reg.	Reg.	Reg.	Reg.	Reg.	^{a}	Reg.	Both	Flag	Flag

^a. Routing via Spences Bridge.

== Infrastructure and incidents ==
KV infrastructure and incidents for Coquihalla–Romeo
Mile^{a}	Place	Passenger Service	Station Building				Section House		Section Crew		Storage Capacity		Engine House	Track		Ref.
Mile^{a}	Place	Passenger Service	Type	Built	Closed	Comments	Built	Comments	From	To	Water Tank	Coal Chute	Engine House	Passing	Other	Ref.
The Juliet–Coquihalla table of the Coldwater River former railway trackage is the adjacent segment.																
17.2	Wye: Operational Jul 1916 to Jul 1961. Mainly used for turning pusher engines from Hope during 1916–c.1930. Sited about 400 metres (1,312 ft) south of present Britton Creek Rest Area. The northeast leg of the wye is the beginning of present Tulameen FSR.															
17.2	By yearend 1913, the westward advance of the KV rail head from the Brodie Station reached this point, where it remained until tracklaying recommenced in late summer 1914.															
18.0	Coquihalla^{e}	Jul 1916 to Nov 1959	Small shack	c.1916.^{c} just north of water tank.	1961	Removed after 1961.	Likely built 1915 just south of water tank.^{d}	Building removed after 1972. Foundation remains.	1916	Dec 1959	180,000 litres; 48,000 US gallons (40,000 imp gal) aligned with present Coquihalla Lakes Lodge.^{d} Deactivated 1954. Foundation remains.	None	Two-stall built 1917 (aligned with north end of Upper Lake).^{c} ^{f} Later demolished.	Jul 1916 to Jul 1961. Length 789 metres (2,588 ft)		
	Coquihalla Lakes Road largely follows the KV rail bed to Mile 18.7, as does the Trans Mountain Pipeline private road to Mile 19.6. At this point, the road leaves the KV rail bed, which is impassable and dangerous, but visible in places on the hillside above.															
19.7	Tunnel #1: 60-metre (196 ft) timber lined. Concrete portals added at west end in 1947 and east end in 1951.															
19.7	Tunnel #2: 85-metre (280 ft) length. Concrete portals added in 1943. Since collapsed.															
20.3	Tunnel #3: 59-metre (192 ft) length. Concrete portals added at west end in 1948 and east end in 1941. Since collapsed.															
20.5	Sweeney's Cut.															
20.6	Gulch: 46-metre (150 ft) timber frame trestle. Rebuilt in 1947. Removed.															
20.7	Gulch: 123-metre (405 ft) timber frame trestle. Rebuilt in 1947. Army demolition exercise blew up in Sep 1969.															
21.0	In early Oct 1914, the westward advance of the KV rail head from the Brodie Station reached this point.															
21.0	Gulch: 15-metre (50 ft) box culvert. Replaced by 32-metre (105 ft) timber frame trestle in 1948.															
21.2	Falls Creek (Bridal Veil Falls to northwest): 123-metre (404 ft) timber frame trestle. Replaced by 123-metre (405 ft) timber frame trestle and steel deck lattice span c.1927. Collapsed winter 1995–96.															
21.4	Hayden's Cut: Unstable rock prevented 15-metre (50 ft) tunnel. Presumably named after conductor Augusto Taylor Hayden, who died in Nov 1916 when a rockslide smashed into a snowplow unit in the vicinity.															
21.5	Gulch: 46-metre (150 ft) timber frame trestle. Destroyed by forest fire in 1938. Snowslide took out 23 metres (75 ft) in 1949. Later removed.															
21.7	Tack Creek: 96-metre (315 ft) timber frame trestle. Replaced by 90-metre (295 ft) steel deck plate girder spans in 1954. Partially dismantled when rails lifted in 1962. Steel towers remain.															
22.2	Gulch: timber frame trestle of unknown dimensions.															
22.3	Gulch: 87-metre (285 ft) timber frame trestle. Destroyed by forest fire in 1938. Replaced by fill in 1952.															
22.5	Tunnel #4: 76-metre (250 ft) length. Concrete portals added at west end in 1945 and east end in 1942. Collapsed in May 1959. Replaced by diversion around the mountain.															
22.7	Cultus Creek: 192-metre (630 ft) timber frame trestle. Removed c.1970.															
23.1	Tunnel #5: 93-metre (306 ft) length. Concrete portals added at west end in 1945 and east end in 1939.															
23.2	Gulch: 41-metre (135 ft) timber frame trestle. Removed.															
23.3	Gulch: 59-metre (195 ft) timber frame trestle. Removed.															
23.5	Tunnel #6: 79-metre (260 ft) length. Concrete portals added at west end in 1942 and east end in 1946.															
23.5	Water: 32,000 litres; 8,400 US gallons (7,000 imp gal) open tank on the northwest side of the main line. Deactivated late 1940s. Mostly emergency water supply.															
23.6	Unnamed creek: 101-metre (330 ft) timber frame trestle. Rebuilt in 1948. Removed.															
23.8	Snowshed #1: 80-metre (264 ft) length. Extended by 145 metres (475 ft) in 1917 and 67 metres (221 ft) in 1918. Removed in late 1945.															

^a. Mileages are 1940–1961, measured from the Brookmere Station building.
^b. Unless specified otherwise, infrastructure detail is c.1931.
^c. Station and engine house erected on the northwest side of the main line.
^d. Section house and water tank erected on the southeast side of the main line.
^e. At an elevation of 1,114 metres (3,656 ft), called Coquihalla Summit prior to 1916 rename.
^f. Deactivated in 1922, being more practical to base pusher engines at Brookmere and Hope.

KV infrastructure and incidents for Romeo–Iago
Mile^{a}	Place	Passenger Service	Station Building				Section House		Section Crew		Storage Capacity		Engine House	Track		Ref.
Mile^{a}	Place	Passenger Service	Type	Built	Closed	Comments	Built	Comments	From	To	Water Tank	Coal Chute	Engine House	Passing	Other	Ref.
24.1	Romeo	Jul 1916 to Nov 1959	None	N/A	N/A	N/A	1915.^{c}	Burned down 1962.	1916	Dec 1959	None	None	None	Jul 1916 to Jul 1961. Length 710 metres (2,330 ft)		
	During switching in 1930, a brakeman slipped and was fatally struck by a freight car.															
24.0	Snowshed #2: 57-metre (186 ft) length. Removed in 1944.															
24.1	Snowshed #3: 70-metre (230 ft) length. Extended by 123 metres (403 ft) in 1920. Removed in 1945.															
24.3	Snowshed #4: Two short sheds 15-metre (48 ft) and 39-metre (128 ft) lengths. Gap of 13 metres (44 ft) closed in 1937. Extended by 34 metres (110 ft) in 1920. Removed in 1945.															
24.4	Snowshed #5: 94-metre (310 ft) length. Extended by 17 metres (55 ft) in 1919 and 15 metres (48 ft) in 1920. Later rebuilt and shortened. Collapsed c.1970.															
24.5	Snowshed #6: about 58-metre (190 ft) length. Removed in late 1943.															
24.7	Snowshed #7: 169-metre (554 ft) length. Gap of 61 metres (200 ft) to shed 8 closed in 1920. Removed in 1945.															
24.7	Snowshed #8: 115-metre (376.5 ft) length. Joined to shed 7 in 1920.															
25.2	Snowshed #9: 123-metre (402 ft) length. Removed in 1946.															
25.3	In November 1941, a westbound passenger train hit a rockslide. The locomotive plunged about 61 metres (200 ft) down an embankment. The fireman and engineer died.															
25.8	Slide (Needle) Creek: 98-metre (320 ft) steel deck truss span, 18-metre (60 ft) deck plate girder span, and 15-metre (50 ft) deck plate girder span. Dismantled in 1981.															
26.0	Snowshed #10: 154-metre (504 ft) length. Extended by 73 metres (240 ft) in 1919 and 83 metres (272 ft) in 1920. Removed in 1945–46.															
26.3	Snowshed #11: 252-metre (826 ft) length. Extended by 61 metres (200 ft) in 1942 and 9 metres (30 ft) in 1944. Removed 288 metres (946 ft) in 1945. Collapsed c.1968.															
26.6	Snowshed #12: Two sheds 36-metre (118 ft) and 216-metre (709 ft) lengths. Gap of 101 metres (330 ft) closed and 225 metres (737 ft) removed at unknown dates. Final part removed c.1969.															
26.8	Snowshed #13: 44-metre (144 ft) length. Removed by 1945.															
26.9	Snowshed #14: 85-metre (280 ft) length. Removed after 1969.															
27.2	Trans Mountain Pipeline road rejoins the former rail bed.															
27.6	Tunnel #7: 50-metre (164 ft) length. Concrete portal added at west end in 1943.															
28.2	Snowshed #15: 110-metre (360 ft) length. Several rebuilds in 1930s. When a snowslide destroyed 52 metres (172 ft) of the timber structure in 1951, a 107-metre (350 ft) reinforced concrete replacement was built. The present road passes around the rock-filled snowshed.															
28.3	Gulch: 123-metre (404 ft) timber frame trestle. Lengthened by 9 metres (31 ft) at an unknown date. Destroyed by rockslide in 1956. Replaced by line revision. Overlooks where the Hudson's Bay Company (HBC) trail forded the river.															
	In late Mar 1926, a freight locomotive fell through the damaged trestle and plunged about 46 metres (150 ft). Two loaded coal cars were destroyed but the locomotive sustained little damage.															

^a. Mileages are 1940–1961, measured from the Brookmere Station building.
^b. Unless specified otherwise, infrastructure detail is c.1931.
^c. Section house erected on the southeast side of the main line.

KV infrastructure and incidents for Iago-Portia
Mile^{a}	Place	Passenger Service	Station Building				Section House		Section Crew		Storage Capacity		Engine House	Track		Ref.
Mile^{a}	Place	Passenger Service	Type	Built	Closed	Comments	Built	Comments	From	To	Water Tank	Coal Chute	Engine House	Passing	Other	Ref.
29.7	Iago^{d}	Jul 1916 to Nov 1959	None	N/A	N/A	N/A	Likely, 1915.^{c}	Half buried in 1932 snowslide. Moved to beside water tank c.1936. Burned down in 1962. Foundation remains.	1916	Dec 1959	91,000-litre; 24,000-US-gallon (20,000 imp gal) enclosed tank.^{c} Rebuilt as open structure in 1948. Dismantled in 1960s. Foundation remains.	54 tonnes (60 short tons) built in 1945.^{c} Dismantled in Mar 1952.	None	Jul 1916 to Jul 1961. Length 81 metres (267 ft)		
	In mid-Dec 1917, a slide struck a snowplow unit at Iago. The caboose plunged about 213 metres (700 ft) into the canyon. One occupant died, two were seriously injured.															
	In late Jan 1954, the lead diesel locomotive of an eastbound passenger train struck a snowslide, derailed, and plunged about 46 metres (150 ft).															
31.0	Norley Creek: 36-metre (119 ft) timber frame trestle. Replaced by fill by 1947.															
31.2	Trans Mountain Pipeline road leaves the former rail bed.															
31.9	Carry Creek: 109-metre (359 ft) timber frame trestle. Replaced by fill in 1944.															
31.9	In mid-Sep 1915, the westward advance of the KV rail head from the Brodie Station reached this point.															
32.0	Unnamed creek: 50 metres (162 ft 11 in) of steel deck plate girder spans. Removed in 1962. Abutments and towers remain.															
33.0	Trans Mountain Pipeline road rejoins the former rail bed.															
33.9	Boston Bar Creek: 21-metre (70 ft) steel deck plate girder span and two 41-metre (134 ft) timber frame trestle approaches. Removed after 1961. Footings are just below the current one-lane timber road bridge off Highway 5 Exit 202.															
34.0	Boston Bar Creek: 26-metre (85 ft) timber frame trestle on western leg of wye. Removed in mid-1980s. The northbound highway on-ramp approximates the eastern leg of the wye. The western leg was almost totally west of the highway. The wye was used primarily to turn snowplows.															

^a. Mileages are 1940–1961, measured from the Brookmere Station building.
^b. Unless specified otherwise, infrastructure detail is c.1931.
^c. Section house, water tank, and coal chute erected on the northwest side of the main line.
^d. Station marker sign on the highway is aligned with the station, which lay due eastward up over the mountain.

KV infrastructure and incidents for Portia-Aurum
Mile^{a}	Place	Passenger Service	Station Building				Section House		Section Crew		Storage Capacity		Engine House	Track		Ref.
Mile^{a}	Place	Passenger Service	Type	Built	Closed	Comments	Built	Comments	From	To	Water Tank	Coal Chute	Engine House	Passing	Other	Ref.
34.4	Portia^{c} ^{d}	Jul 1916 to Nov 1959	None	N/A	N/A	N/A	None	N/A	N/A	N/A	None	None	None	Jul 1916 to Jul 1961. Length 780 metres (2,559 ft)		
35.2	Gulch: 123-metre (405 ft) timber frame trestle. Replaced by fill in 1954.^{d}															
35.5	Unnamed creek: 34-metre (112 ft) timber frame trestle from early 1930s. Removed.															
35.9	Unnamed creek: 109-metre (359 ft) timber frame trestle. Rebuilt during 1940s and 1950s. Removed.															
36.7	Tunnel #8: 28-metre (91 ft) length. Concrete portals added at west end in 1944 and east end in 1949. Since collapsed.															
36.8	Ladner Creek: 171-metre (560 ft) length, comprising eight steel deck plate girder spans, which stand 69 metres (225 ft) above the creek. The 12-degree curve is the sharpest on the KV.															
36.8	In early Sep 1915, the eastward advance of the KV rail head from the CN/KV crossing at Hope reached this point. In mid-Oct 1915, a rockslide demolished the bridge construction camp after the inhabitants had left for work that day.															
36.9	Unnamed creek: Box culvert. Replaced by 41-metre (135 ft) timber frame trestle after early 1930s. Removed.															
37.0	Unnamed creek: 32-metre (104 ft) timber frame trestle. Replaced by 14-metre (45 ft) timber frame trestle at unknown date. Removed.															
37.1	Twenty Mile Creek: 40-metre (131 ft 8 in) comprising two steel deck plate girder spans. Removed.															
37.7	Unnamed creek: 77-metre (254 ft) timber frame trestle. Replaced by fill and concrete culvert in 1930.															

^a. Mileages are 1940–1961, measured from the Brookmere Station building.
^b. Unless specified otherwise, infrastructure detail is c.1931.
^c. Station marker sign on the highway.
^d. Highway construction obliterated in mid-1980s.

KV infrastructure and incidents for Aurum-Jessica
Mile^{a}	Place	Passenger Service	Station Building				Section House		Section Crew		Storage Capacity		Engine House	Track		Ref.
Mile^{a}	Place	Passenger Service	Type	Built	Closed	Comments	Built	Comments	From	To	Water Tank	Coal Chute	Engine House	Passing	Other	Ref.
38.3	Aurum	Sep 1931 to Sep 1947	None	N/A	N/A	N/A	None	N/A	N/A	N/A	None	None	None	None		
38.3	Tangent Creek: 87-metre (284 ft) timber frame trestle. Replaced by fill and 4-metre (12 ft) timber frame trestle and concrete culvert in 1956. After the Nov 1959 washout, this fill was never repaired.															
38.5	Unnamed creek: 16-metre (54 ft) timber frame trestle. Replaced by 6-metre (21 ft) steel half deck plate girder span in 1950.															
38.6	Verona	Apr 1922 to Sep 1925	None	N/A	N/A	N/A	None	N/A	N/A	N/A	None	None	None	None		
38.7	Unnamed creek: 73-metre (240 ft) pile trestle later lengthened. Replaced by concrete box culvert on realignment in 1944.															
39.0	Fifteen Mile Creek: 68-metre (224 ft) timber frame trestle. Replaced by 73-metre (240 ft) timber frame trestle at unknown date. Removed. When the rail bed became a logging road, two adjacent flatcars were installed as the road bridge deck.															
39.4	Unnamed creek: 23-metre (74 ft) timber frame trestle. Replaced by 23-metre (75 ft) timber frame trestle on old alignment. Replaced by 18-metre (60 ft) timber frame trestle in 1950 on new alignment.															
39.5	Unnamed creek: 32-metre (105 ft) timber frame trestle on old alignment.															
39.6	Snowshoe Creek: 96-metre (315 ft) timber frame trestle on old alignment. Added 14 metres (45 ft) in 1932 and 30 metres (98 ft) in 1946.															
39.6	Snowshoe Creek: 5-metre (15 ft) timber frame trestle on new alignment in 1950.															

^a. Mileages are 1940–1961, measured from the Brookmere Station building.

KV infrastructure and incidents for Jessica–Lear
Mile^{a}	Place	Passenger Service	Station Building				Section House		Section Crew		Storage Capacity		Engine House	Track		Ref.
Mile^{a}	Place	Passenger Service	Type	Built	Closed	Comments	Built	Comments	From	To	Water Tank	Coal Chute	Engine House	Passing	Other	Ref.
39.8	Jessica	Jul 1916 to Nov 1959	Small freight/passenger shelter.	Unknown	1961		Likely 1915, west of water tank.^{c}	Removed. Foundation remains.	1916	Dec 1959	91,000-litre; 24,000-US-gallon (20,000 imp gal) enclosed tank.^{c} Deactivated 1947.	None	None	Jul 1916 to Jul 1961. Length 809 metres (2,655 ft)		
40.2	Gulch: 32-metre (104 ft) timber frame trestle. Replaced by fill in 1952.															
40.3	Gulch: 79-metre (259 ft) timber frame trestle. Replaced by fill in 1951 on old alignment.															
40.5	Gulch: 73-metre (240 ft) timber frame trestle. Replaced by fill in 1951 on new alignment.															
40.5	In early Sep 1926, a runaway freight train derailed at the east end of the bridge, plunged into the canyon, and caused at least four deaths. Fire destroyed the bridge, which was rebuilt.															
40.9	Unnamed creek: Wood box culvert. Replaced by 14-metre (45 ft) timber pile trestle in 1947. Replaced by a fill and pipe at unknown date.															
41.4	Unnamed creek: Bridge top culvert. Replaced by 14-metre (45 ft) timber pile trestle at unknown date.															
42.5	Eleven Mile (Deneau) Creek: 87-metre (284 ft) timber frame trestle. Replaced by 87-metre (285 ft) timber frame trestle at unknown date.															
43.0	Unnamed creek: 14-metre (45 ft) timber pile trestle. When washed out in Nov 1959, never repaired.															
43.1	Ten Mile Creek: 37-metre (120 ft) timber frame trestle. Replaced by fill and steel culvert in 1954.															
44.4	Nine Mile Creek: Bridge top culvert. Replaced by 5-metre (15 ft) timber pile trestle at unknown date.															

^a. Mileages are 1940–1961, measured from the Brookmere Station building.
^b. Unless specified otherwise, infrastructure detail is c.1931.
^c. Section house and water tank erected on the northwest side of the main line.

KV Infrastructure for Lear–Hope
Mile^{a}	Place	Passenger Service	Station Building				Section House		Section Crew		Storage Capacity		Engine House	Track		Ref.
Mile^{a}	Place	Passenger Service	Type	Built	Closed	Comments	Built	Comments	From	To	Water Tank	Coal Chute	Engine House	Passing	Other	Ref.
45.2	Lear^{c}	Jul 1916 to Nov 1959	Small freight/passenger shelter.	Unknown	1961		Likely 1915.	Removed after 1961.	1916	Dec 1959	180,000-litre; 48,000-US-gallon (40,000 imp gal) open tank built in 1947. Deactivated in winter 1953–54.	None	None	Jul 1916 to Jul 1961. Length 802 metres (2,631 ft)		
46.2	Gold Creek	May 1927 to Sep 1930	None	N/A	N/A	N/A	None	N/A	N/A	N/A	None	None	None	None		
49.0	Othello															
54.3	Hope															

^a. Mileages are 1940–1961, measured from the Brookmere Station building.
^b. Unless specified otherwise, infrastructure detail is c.1931.
^c. Station marker sign on the highway.

== Epilogue ==
The massive capital investment of the difficult construction was never remotely recovered.

In 1960, Trans Mountain Pipeline bought the Brodie–Jessica right-of-way. That year, work trains, operating from each side of the blockage, collected employee and CP possessions. In 1961, CP announced plans to formally abandon the route, which received government approval that summer. Rails were lifted westward from Mile 38.3 to Hope in August 1961 and eastward from the washout to Boston Bar Creek in September and October. The balance were removed in 1962. Trans Mountain Pipeline built a private road north from Portia. largely upon the former rail bed.

In October 1961, KV passenger trains terminated at Spences Bridge in the middle of the night for transfers to a main line connection, instead of terminating at Vancouver.

The surviving rail bed forms part of the Kettle Valley Rail Trail segment of the Trans Canada Trail.
