= Agassiz, British Columbia =

Agassiz
- Unincorporated community
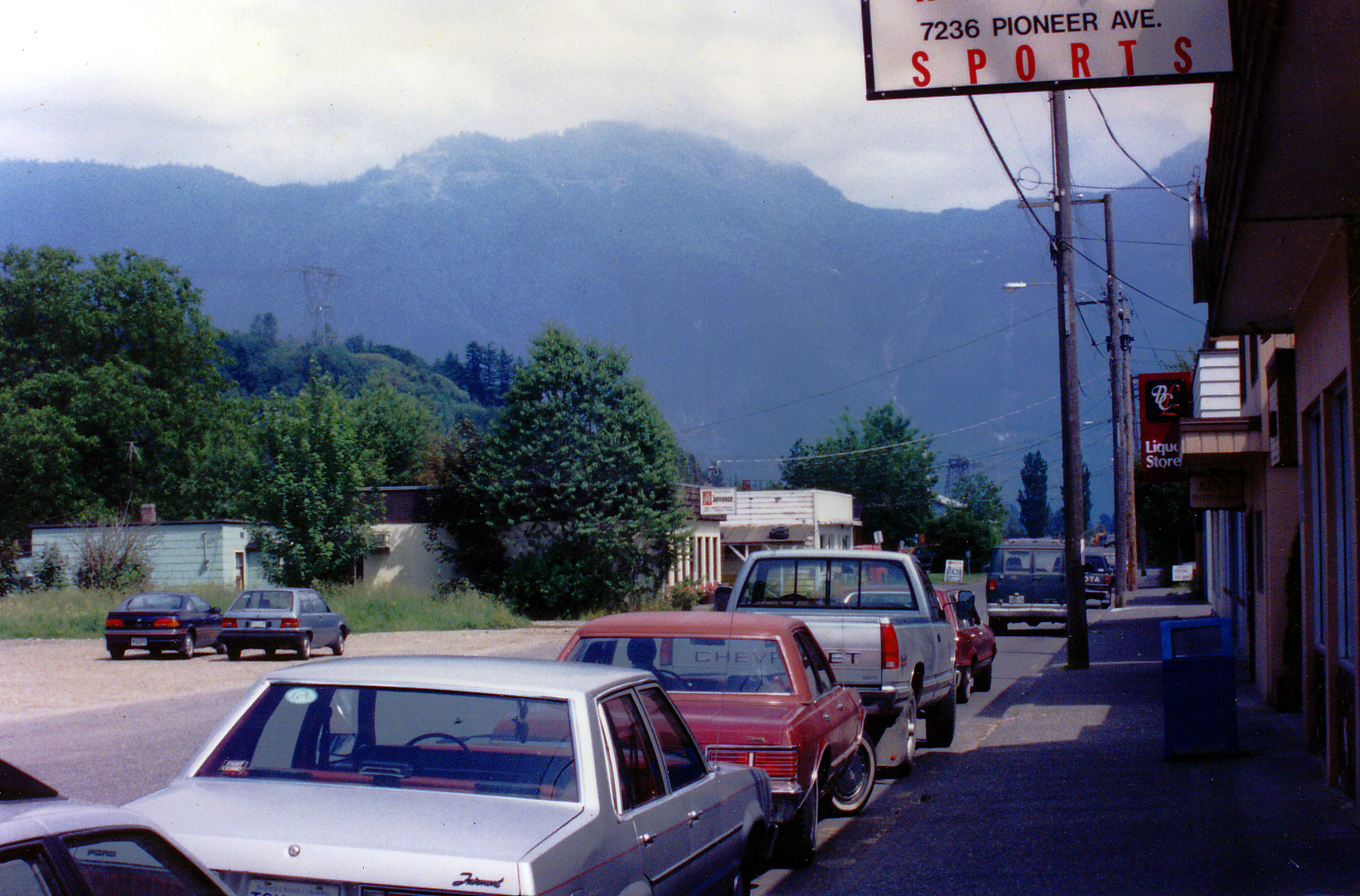
- A view of the mountains from the street

- Location within British Columbia
- Coordinates: 49°14′20.19″N 121°45′57.18″W
- Country: Canada
- Province: British Columbia
- Regional district: Fraser Valley
- Named for: Lewis Nunn Agassiz, a member of the Agassiz family

Area
  - Land: 2,500.5 km^{2} (965.4 sq mi)
- Elevation: 48 m (157 ft)

Population
  - Estimate (2021): 6,300
  - Density: 1.6/km^{2} (4.1/sq mi)
- Time zone: UTC-07:00
- Postal codes: V0M 0A6, V0M 1A0, V0M 1A1, V0M 1A2, V0M 1A3, V0M 1A4
- Area codes: 604, 250, 778, 236, 672

Agassiz (/ˈæɡəsi/ AG-ə-see) is a small community located in the Eastern Fraser Valley region of British Columbia, Canada, about 97 kilometres east of Vancouver and 24 kilometres north-east of the city of Chilliwack.

Agassiz is the only town centre within the jurisdiction of the District Municipality of Kent. The majority of Kent's population resides in the Agassiz area.

== History ==
The land on the Fraser that is now called Agassiz was once the location of villages of the First Nation Steaten people that had been wiped out by smallpox starting in 1782. Later, another village of former First Nation slaves settled there called Freedom Village (Halkomelem: Chi'ckim).

Modern day Agassiz was founded by Lewis Nunn Agassiz, an English member of the Agassiz family. Agassiz had been a soldier serving with the 23rd Royal Welsh Fusiliers in eastern Canada, where he met and married Mary Caroline Schram. The Agassizs’ journeyed from Prince Edward Island to British Columbia, where they established a homestead in 1858, named "Ferney Combe". Only on arrival of the Canadian Pacific railway in 1885 was the community formally named "Agassiz".

== Demographics ==
In the 2021 Census of Population conducted by Statistics Canada, Kent had a population of 6,300 living in 2,351 of its 2,518 total private dwellings, a change of 3.8% from its 2016 population of 6,067. With a land area of 168.59 km^{2} (65.09 sq mi), it had a population density of 37.4/km^{2} (96.8/sq mi) in 2021.

== Climate ==
Agassiz has an oceanic climate (Cfb) with warm summers with cool nights and cool, rainy winters. Mid-summer to early fall is generally the driest time of the year, with only 1 out of every 3 days on average having precipitation.

Agassiz, British Columbia

Climate chart (precipitation, max. and min. temperature)
| J | F | M | A | M | J | J | A | S | O | N | D |
| 229 6 1 | 128 9 2 | 170 11 3 | 123 15 6 | 96 19 9 | 92 21 12 | 55 25 13 | 63 25 13 | 92 22 11 | 184 15 7 | 271 9 4 | 212 6 1 |
- █ Average max. and min. temperatures in °C
- █ Precipitation totals in mm
Imperial conversion
| J | F | M | A | M | J | J | A | S | O | N | D |
| 9 43 33 | 5 47 36 | 6.7 52 38 | 4.9 59 42 | 3.8 67 49 | 3.6 70 53 | 2.2 77 56 | 2.5 77 55 | 3.6 71 51 | 7.2 59 45 | 11 48 38 | 8.3 42 34 |
- █ Average max. and min. temperatures in °F
- █ Precipitation totals in inches

Climate data for Agassiz, British Columbia (normals 1991-2020)
| Month | Jan | Feb | Mar | Apr | May | Jun | Jul | Aug | Sep | Oct | Nov | Dec | Year |
|---|---|---|---|---|---|---|---|---|---|---|---|---|---|
| Record high °C (°F) | 17.2 (63.0) | 21.7 (71.1) | 25.8 (78.4) | 32.2 (90.0) | 36.0 (96.8) | 41.4 (106.5) | 38.3 (100.9) | 39.4 (102.9) | 36.8 (98.2) | 29.6 (85.3) | 21.1 (70.0) | 17.2 (63.0) | 41.4 (106.5) |
| Mean maximum °C (°F) | 12.1 (53.8) | 14.1 (57.4) | 18.9 (66.0) | 23.9 (75.0) | 28.7 (83.7) | 30.4 (86.7) | 32.9 (91.2) | 32.3 (90.1) | 29.5 (85.1) | 22.5 (72.5) | 15.1 (59.2) | 11.8 (53.2) | 34.5 (94.1) |
| Mean daily maximum °C (°F) | 6.1 (43.0) | 8.6 (47.5) | 11.3 (52.3) | 15.0 (59.0) | 19.3 (66.7) | 21.2 (70.2) | 24.9 (76.8) | 25.0 (77.0) | 21.6 (70.9) | 15.1 (59.2) | 9.0 (48.2) | 5.8 (42.4) | 15.2 (59.4) |
| Daily mean °C (°F) | 3.5 (38.3) | 5.3 (41.5) | 7.3 (45.1) | 10.4 (50.7) | 14.2 (57.6) | 16.4 (61.5) | 19.0 (66.2) | 19.0 (66.2) | 16.2 (61.2) | 11.2 (52.2) | 6.4 (43.5) | 3.5 (38.3) | 11.0 (51.8) |
| Mean daily minimum °C (°F) | 0.8 (33.4) | 2.0 (35.6) | 3.3 (37.9) | 5.8 (42.4) | 9.2 (48.6) | 11.5 (52.7) | 13.1 (55.6) | 13.0 (55.4) | 10.8 (51.4) | 7.4 (45.3) | 3.6 (38.5) | 1.1 (34.0) | 6.8 (44.2) |
| Mean minimum °C (°F) | −6.5 (20.3) | −3.5 (25.7) | −2.2 (28.0) | 1.0 (33.8) | 3.9 (39.0) | 7.3 (45.1) | 9.3 (48.7) | 8.4 (47.1) | 6.2 (43.2) | 2.1 (35.8) | −2.4 (27.7) | −5.3 (22.5) | −9.4 (15.1) |
| Record low °C (°F) | −25.0 (−13.0) | −24.4 (−11.9) | −14.4 (6.1) | −3.9 (25.0) | −1.1 (30.0) | 1.7 (35.1) | 3.3 (37.9) | 1.7 (35.1) | −1.1 (30.0) | −8.5 (16.7) | −19.0 (−2.2) | −21.1 (−6.0) | −25.0 (−13.0) |
| Average precipitation mm (inches) | 229.0 (9.02) | 128.1 (5.04) | 169.6 (6.68) | 123.3 (4.85) | 96.1 (3.78) | 91.5 (3.60) | 55.4 (2.18) | 63.0 (2.48) | 92.0 (3.62) | 183.8 (7.24) | 271.2 (10.68) | 211.6 (8.33) | 1,714.6 (67.50) |
| Average rainfall mm (inches) | 250.2 (9.85) | 136.6 (5.38) | 151.8 (5.98) | 123.0 (4.84) | 89.7 (3.53) | 90.7 (3.57) | 55.1 (2.17) | 68.7 (2.70) | 98.3 (3.87) | 185.4 (7.30) | 267.8 (10.54) | 216.8 (8.54) | 1,734.1 (68.27) |
| Average snowfall cm (inches) | 18.2 (7.2) | 4.7 (1.9) | 7.2 (2.8) | 0 (0) | 0 (0) | 0 (0) | 0 (0) | 0 (0) | 0 (0) | 0 (0) | 7.4 (2.9) | 14.4 (5.7) | 51.9 (20.5) |
| Average precipitation days (≥ 0.2 mm) | 22.4 | 18.5 | 20.3 | 19.0 | 15.9 | 16.4 | 10.8 | 11.6 | 13.5 | 20.3 | 21.6 | 21.4 | 211.7 |
| Average rainy days (≥ 0.2 mm) | 18.5 | 17.1 | 21.6 | 18.8 | 17.1 | 16.0 | 10.5 | 9.6 | 12.9 | 19.7 | 22.1 | 19.7 | 203.5 |
| Average snowy days (≥ 0.2 cm) | 3.4 | 1.4 | 1.2 | 0 | 0 | 0 | 0 | 0 | 0 | 0 | 1.1 | 2.8 | 9.9 |
| Average dew point °C (°F) | −0.5 (31.1) | 0.1 (32.2) | 2.4 (36.3) | 4.9 (40.8) | 8.6 (47.5) | 11.3 (52.3) | 13.6 (56.5) | 13.8 (56.8) | 11.4 (52.5) | 7.3 (45.1) | 3.1 (37.6) | 0.1 (32.2) | 6.4 (43.5) |
| Mean monthly sunshine hours | 57.8 | 85.7 | 127.7 | 163.9 | 194.2 | 195.6 | 255.8 | 242.2 | 196.8 | 122.2 | 60.2 | 53.6 | 1,755.6 |
Source 1: Environment Canada
Source 2: weatherstats.ca (for dewpoint and monthly&yearly average absolute maximum&minimum temperature)

== Arts and culture ==
=== TV shows ===
The television drama Wayward Pines (2015–2016) was filmed on location in the community. The series finale episode, unintentionally harking back to the annihilation of the Steaten people by smallpox, ends with the last few hundred humans on Earth in the 39th century deciding to commit genocide of the entire intelligent, yet simple, new Homo species that has evolved on an Earth decimated by humans in the 21st century – by infecting the new species with typhoid, Marburg virus, and the bubonic plague.

=== Winter Night Lights ===
Running through November and December, Winter Night Lights is an annual Christmas lights display at the Agassiz Harrison Museum, Historic Aberdeen building, and Pioneer Park.

== Government and infrastructure ==
The Agriculture and Agri-Food Canada Agassiz Research and Development Centre, which leads integrated research on peri-urban agriculture in Canada, and the Correctional Service of Canada (CSC) Kent Institution is in Agassiz.

== Transportation ==
Agassiz is served by Via Rail's The Canadian as a flag stop. The station is only served by eastbound trains towards Toronto. Westbound trains call at Chilliwack along the CN Railway tracks, on the other side of the Fraser River. This split in service between Vancouver and Ashcroft is due to CN and CPR utilizing directional running through the Thompson- and Fraser Canyon.

Services at Agassiz station
- | Preceding station | Via Rail | Following station |
  |---|---|---|
  | Mission Harbour One-way operation | The Canadian | Katz toward Toronto |

== Gallery ==
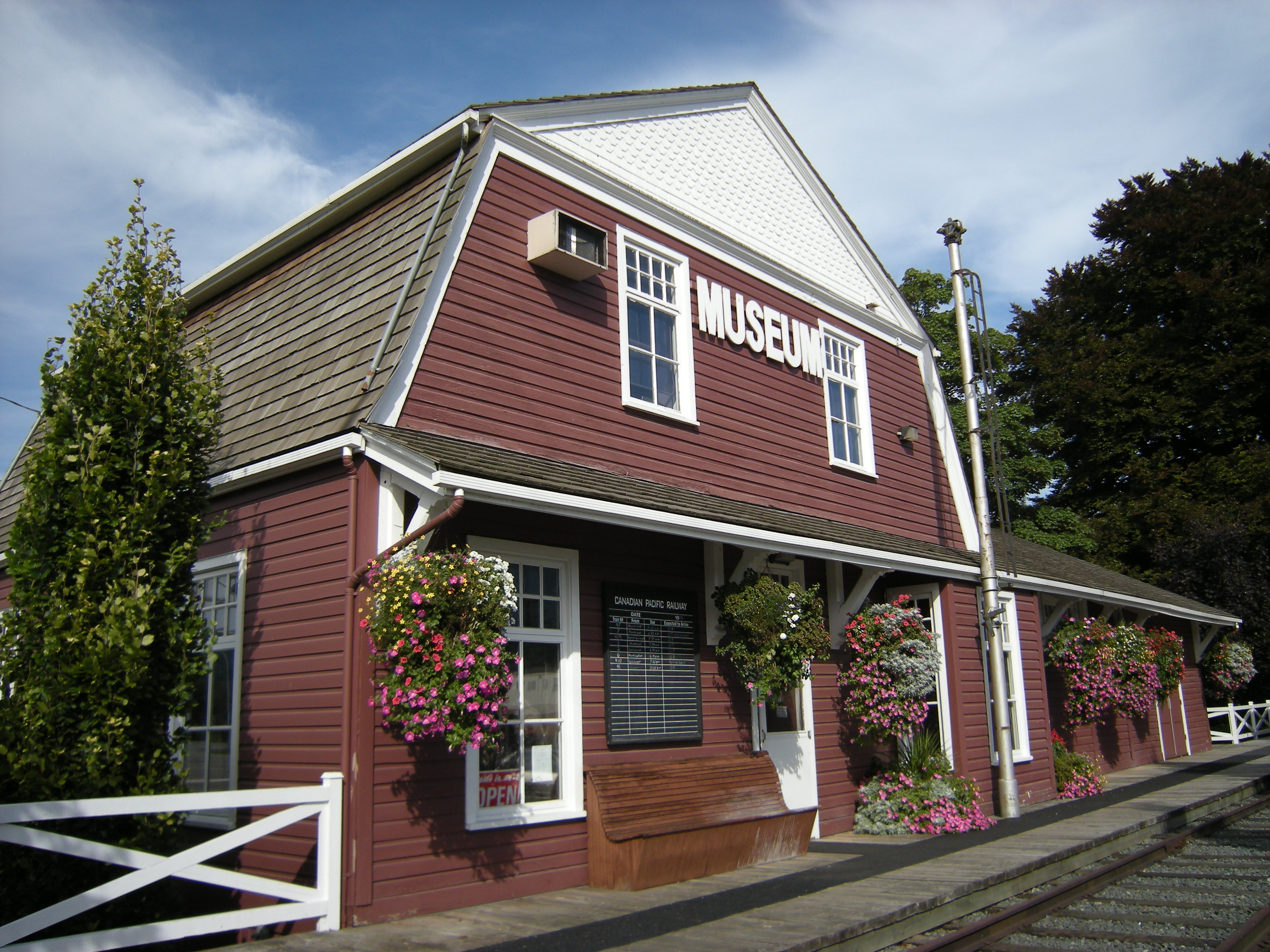
The Agassiz-Harrison Museum

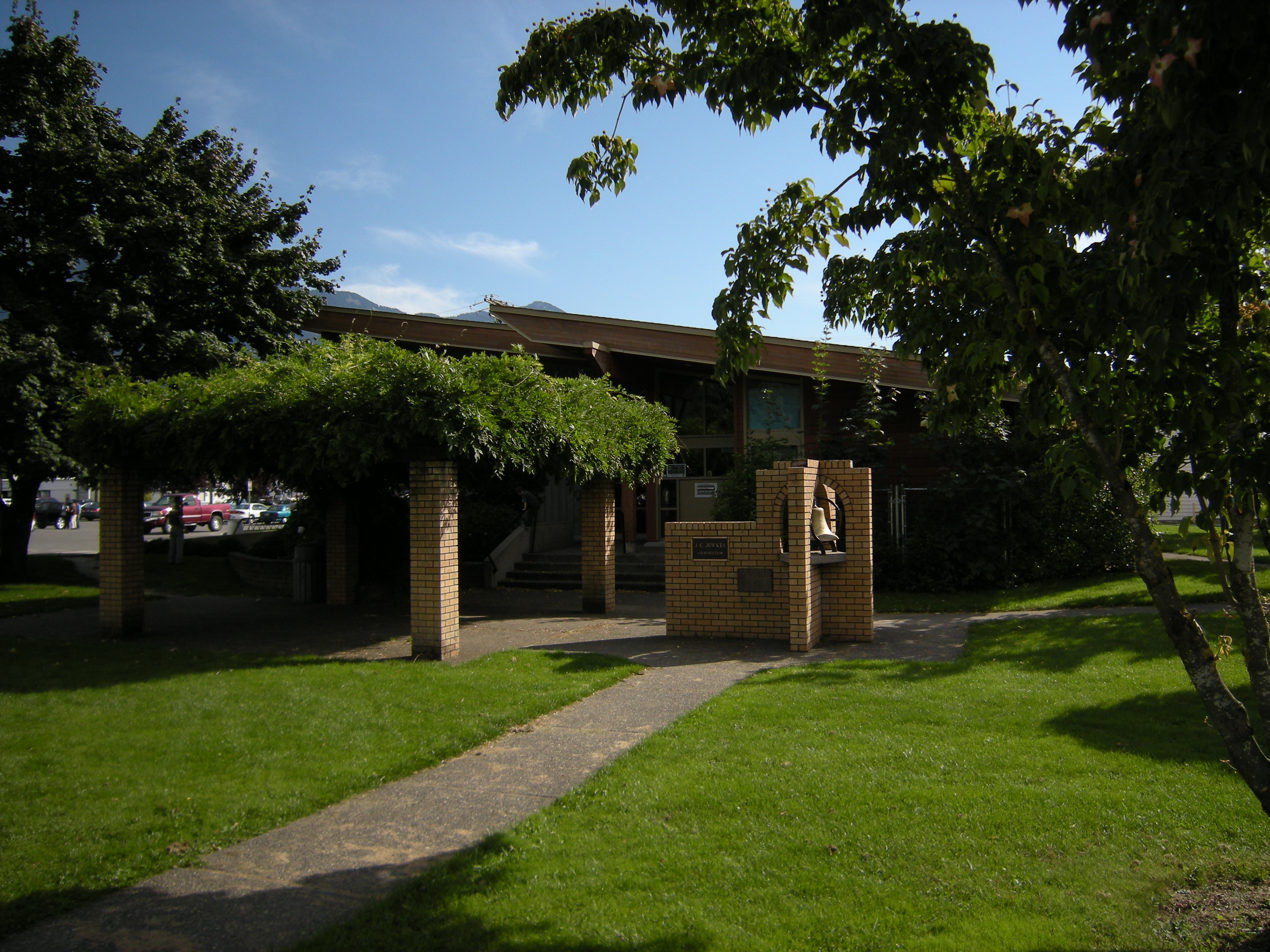
District of Kent District Hall and Public Library, Agassiz, BC.

== Notable people ==
- Marc-André Leclerc

== See also ==
- Agassiz-Rosedale Bridge
- Harrison Hot Springs
