= Freedom Village =

Canadian village founded by former slaves

- Chi'ckem (Halkomelem)
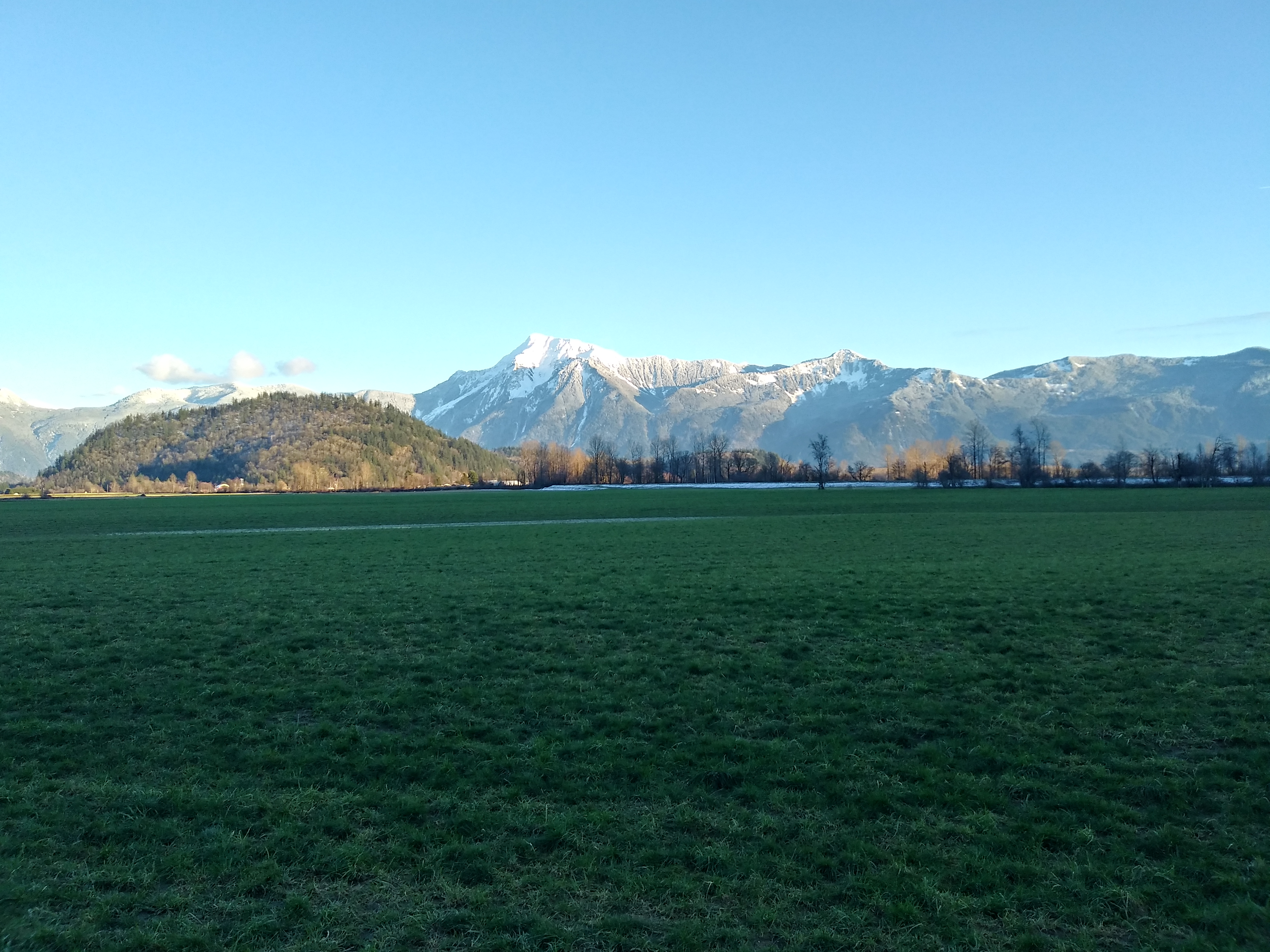
- Approximate location of the Freedom Village (Chi'ckem) in present day Agassiz, BC in 2020
- Interactive map of Freedom Village
- 49°14′00.3″N 121°50′45.1″W
- Location: Agassiz, British Columbia, Canada

Freedom Village (Halkomelem: Chi'ckem) was a historic village founded by the former slaves (Halkomelem: skw'iyeth) of the Stó:lō, Chawathil First Nation who lived near present-day Hope, British Columbia.

== History ==
Starting in the late 18th century the peoples in what is now the Fraser Valley were undergoing intense social change. Starting in 1782 waves of the smallpox virus started to wipe out local First Nation peoples. As they dealt with this and other diseases, Europeans started to settle in the area starting with the Hudson's Bay Company establishing trading posts at Fort Langley (in 1827) and Fort Yale (1848).

Greenwood Island (Halkomelem: Welqdmex), near the town of Hope in British Columbia, was a slave village to the Chawathil First Nation peoples who lived near what is now Hope. For generations, the Chawathil had raided surrounding First Nation communities and taken slaves. The slaves on the island more than offset this loss and increased their population through natural childbirth. There were so many slaves that the slaveholders, fearing a revolt, forced them all out of their longhouses and onto the island, where they created their own community. This in turn slowly slipped out of the slaveholders’ control until a decision by the Chawathil elders was made to abandon the village. Once the slaves became aware that they were "free" they decided they didn't want to live so close to their former masters, and so they created large catamarans by dismantling their longhouses and using the planks to connect their canoes.

When they were finished they floated down the Fraser River and founded Freedom Village (Halkomelem: Chi'ckem) in present-day Agassiz. The area was previously the site of a First Nation village of the Steaten people that had been wiped out by disease years earlier. Over time, the former slaves that made up the Chi'ckem village intermarried into the surrounding communities and became absorbed into the local First Nations populations.

== Bibliography ==
Notes

References

- Arnold, Michael Blake; Moore, Patrick; Clague, John J. (October 2009). "Exploring Stó:Lō-Coast Salish Interaction and Identity in Ancient Houses and Settlements in the Fraser Valley, British Columbia". American Antiquity. 74 (4). Society for American Archaeology: 595–626. doi:10.1017/S0002731600048988. ISSN 0002-7316. JSTOR 20622468. OCLC 1479302.
- Carlson, Keith Thor (2010). The Power of Place, the Problem of Time: Aboriginal Identity and Historical Consciousness in the Cauldron of Colonialism. University of Toronto Press. ISBN 9781442699960. - Total pages: 368
- Kennedy, Grace (January 2, 2020). "Celebrating 125: Freedom Village showcases Agassiz as place of opportunity". Agassiz Harrison Observer.
