= Ashcroft station =

Railway station in British Columbia, Canada

Ashcroft

General information
- Location: Caribou Rd, Ashcroft, BC; Canada
- Coordinates: 50.7298°N 121.2760°W
- Platforms: 1 side platform
- Tracks: 1

Construction
- Structure type: Sign post

Services
Preceding station	Via Rail	Following station
North Bend One-way operation	The Canadian	Kamloops North toward Toronto
Boston Bar toward Vancouver	The Canadian	Kamloops North toward Toronto
Former services
Preceding station	Via Rail	Following station
Hope toward Vancouver	Super Continental	Kamloops North toward Toronto
Preceding station	Canadian National Railway	Following station
Basque toward Vancouver	Main Line	McAbee toward Montreal
Location
- Location within British Columbia Location within Canada

Ashcroft station is on the Canadian National Railway mainline in Ashcroft, British Columbia, Canada. There is no actual building or place of shelter - VIA Rail says the station type is a signpost. The stopping point is located on the north side of the Thompson River (in North Ashcroft, opposite the main Ashcroft town site). The station is served by Via Rail's The Canadian as a flag stop (48-hour advance notice required).

== History ==
In summer 1884, the Canadian Pacific Railway (CP) built a log bunkhouse and station at the new townsite. The structure was the standard-design (Bohi's Type 5) single-storey station building with gable roof and dormers (identical to Keefers). In early December, the eastward advance of the CP rail head from Port Moody passed through the townsite. Initially called St. Cloud by the railway (after St. Cloud, the access point to the Red River Trails on the Saint Paul and Pacific Railroad), the name did not last. The post office, which opened in 1886, was named Ashcroft Station. However, the settlement was equally known as Barnes.

In 1960, the station was replaced. The present mobile station building dates from about 2020. The CP Ashcroft passing track is 2.6 kilometres (8,645 ft).

In February 1912, the 244-metre (800 ft) Canadian Northern Railway (CNoR) tunnel at Black Canyon was virtually completed.

The Ashcroft flag stop, identified only by a pole in the ground, serves Via Rail's The Canadian.

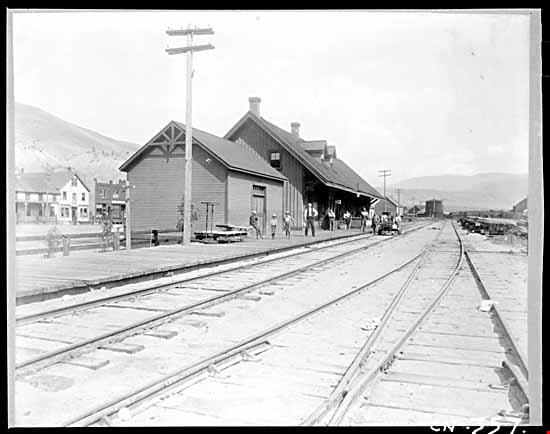
CP Station, Ashcroft, 1899

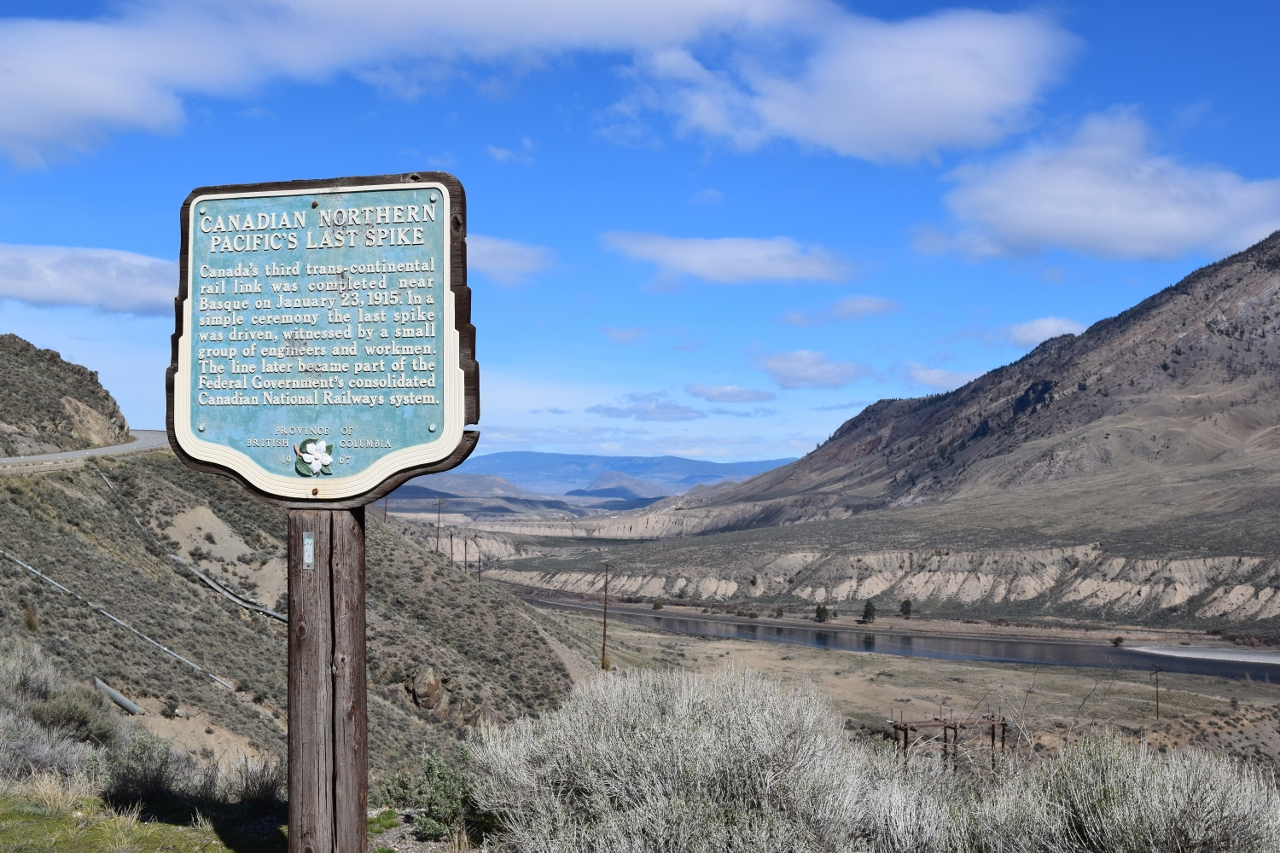
1915 last spike plaque, near Basque

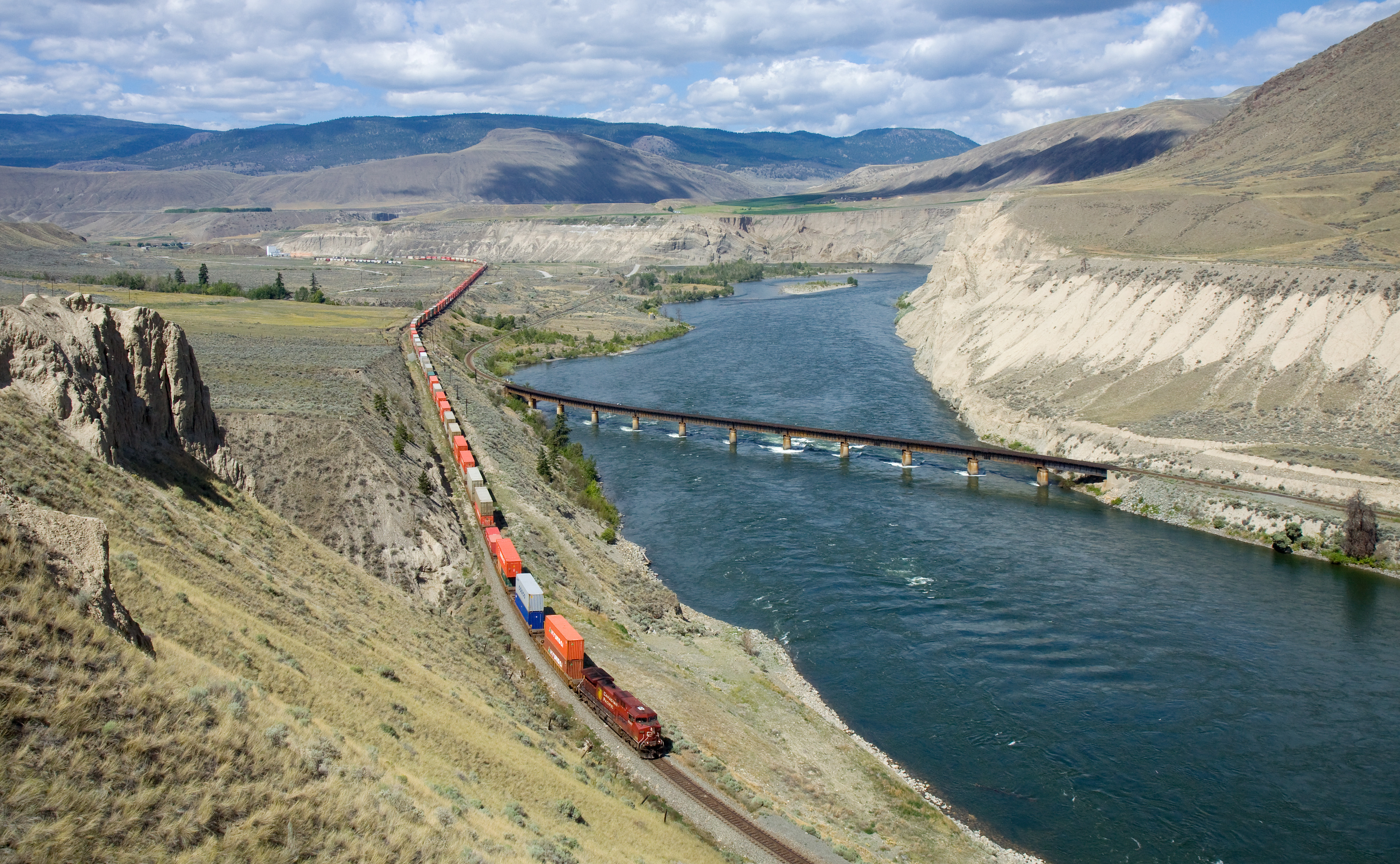
Westward view of CN bridge and CP Terminal (background), Ashcroft, 2011
