= Brookmere =

- Locality
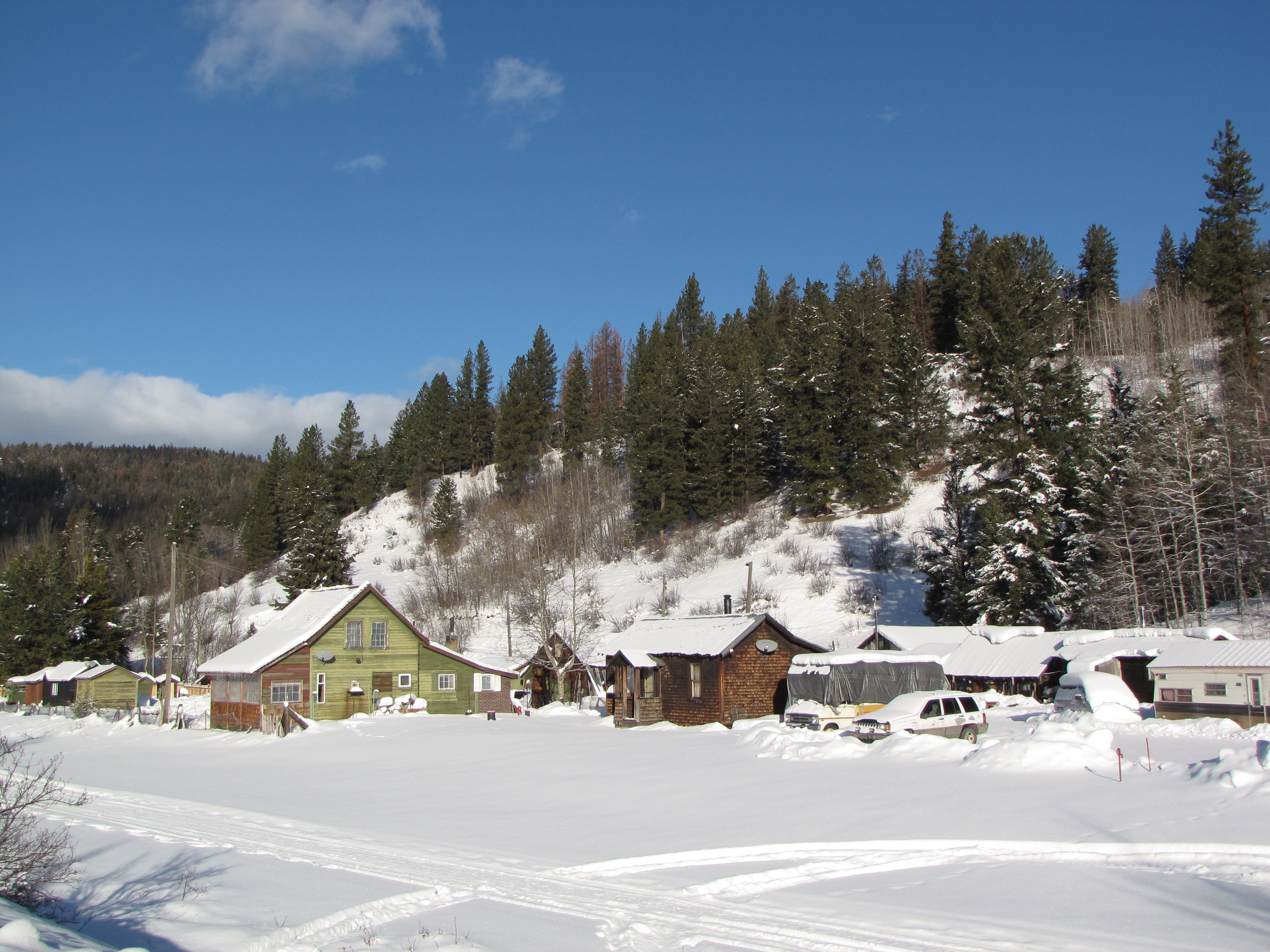
- Residences, Brookmere, 2010

- Location within British Columbia
- Coordinates: 49°49′04″N 120°52′34″W
- Country: Canada
- Province: British Columbia
- Region: Nicola Country
- Regional District: Thompson-Nicola
- Time zone: UTC−07:00 (PT)
- Area codes: 250, 778, 236, & 672
- Highways: off Highway 5

Brookmere is an unincorporated community adjacent to Brook Creek in the Nicola region of south central British Columbia, Canada. On Coldwater Rd (exit 256 from the Coquihalla Highway), the former railway hamlet is by road about 44 kilometres (27 mi) south of Merritt.

== Township plans ==
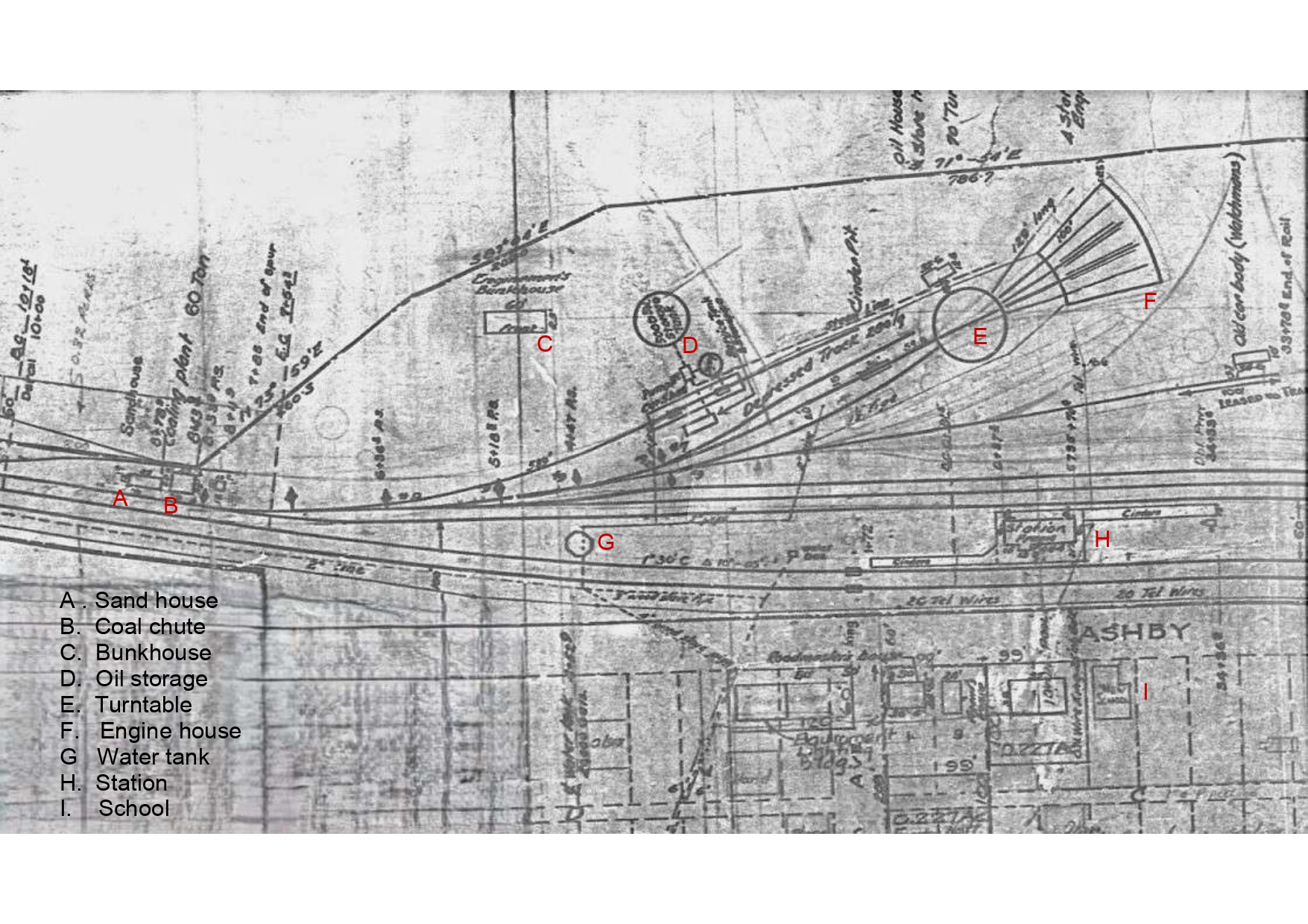
Blueprint of Brookmere, 1949

The immediate area was known as Otter Summit, deriving from Spearing Creek (formerly called the west arm of Otter Creek). In late September 1911, the eastward advance of the Canadian Pacific Railway (CP) rail head reached the location in a step toward ultimately connecting with the westward advancing Kettle Valley Railway (KV), a CP subsidiary. By the next year, trains operated as far east as this point, which became the new base for the Nicola Branch crews.

The Vancouver, Victoria and Eastern Railway (VV&E), a Great Northern Railway (GN) subsidiary, was equally expected to pass in close proximity. In the surrounding area, 3,400 hectares (8,500 acres) of lumber were available for harvest. Louis Henry Brooks, who owned the land at the summit, partnered with the KV to market a township to be called Brooksville, which would comprise 360 lots. The earliest newspaper mention of that name was December 1911.

By 1915, L.H. Brooks had sold his ranch house and relocated to 5 kilometres (3 mi) south of Canyon House (Thalia) along the railway line, where he was developing a new ranch. However, he unexpectedly died the following year.

== Railway ==
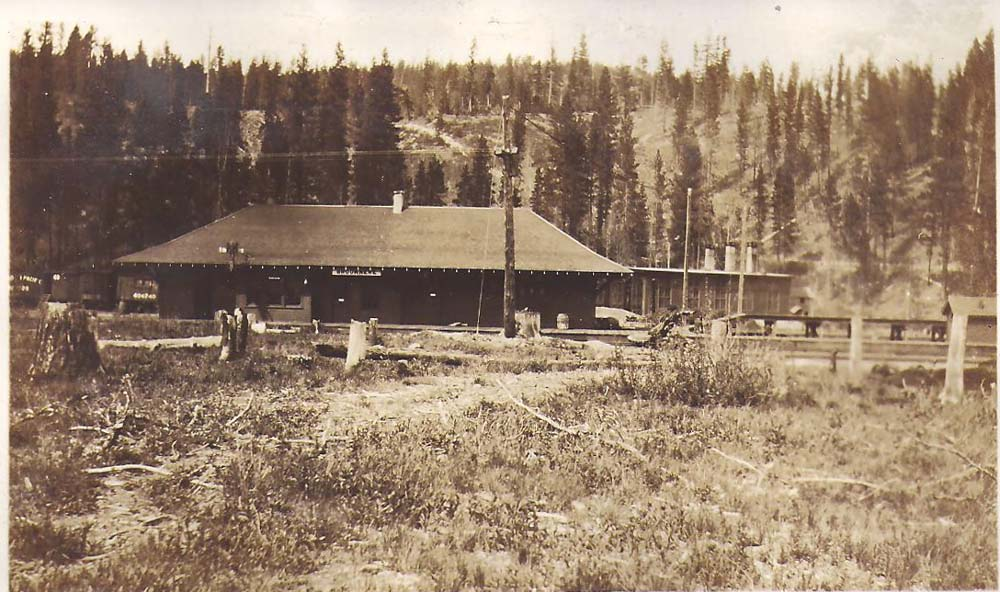
Brookmere Station, 1919

In November 1913, CP and GN signed the Coquihalla Agreement, whereby CP would build and maintain the Coquihalla line, but GN would receive running rights. In early 1914, they signed the Tulameen Agreement, whereby GN would be responsible for Princeton–Brookmere, upon which CP would have running rights, as agreed in 1912. In late October 1914, in a brief informal ceremony at Brookmere, Louis Hill drove the last spike for the VV&E line connection.

The earliest newspaper mention of the station name change from Otter Summit to Brookmere was May 1915, but the former name remained in general use during that year. When scheduled CP service via Brookmere and Spences Bridge to the coast began in June 1915, GN handed over all general freight and passenger services northwest of Princeton to the KV.

In 1916, the KV erected a station, small workshop, and three-stall roundhouse. The 21-metre (70 ft) turntable, originally hand operated, was later rotated by compressed air. The rail yard was designed for joint KV and GN use. The station building was in the middle of the yard instead of at one side, and the water tower had two spouts instead of the usual one. However, GN chose to never operate at Brookmere. The next year, fire destroyed the station and dining facility.

In July 1926, the freight divisional point moved from Hope to Brookmere, followed by the passenger one in February 1931. The isolation and long, cold winters with abundant snow caused railway employees to disparagingly refer to the place as "Siberia".

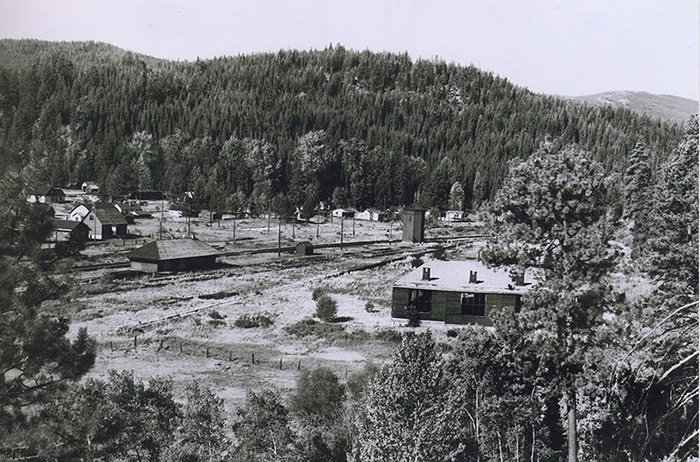
Rear of roundhouse, rail yard, station, and water tower, Brookmere, 1924

The station was busiest during World War II, when the sizeable volumes of traffic originally projected for the railway became a reality for a several years.

GN never commercially used the Coquihalla leg, yet had paid CP $150,000 annually since 1916, whereas CP had paid GN $60,000 annually for actual use of the Tulameen leg. In 1944–45, to end such payments, GN paid $4,500,000 to CP to terminate the Coquihalla Agreement. In turn, CP paid GN $1,500,000 to terminate the Tulameen Agreement and acquired that leg.

In October 1957, mixed train passenger service to Spences Bridge ended. When the Coquihalla route closed in late 1959, long-distance passenger trains diverted via Merritt.

In January 1964, passenger service ended on the line. In 1966, the freight crew base moved to Merrit.

In 1979, Jack and Katie Murphy, who had acquired the rail yard, purchased and relocated the boarded up station onto the former engine house foundation, where they remodelled the interior into a modern duplex.

In 1986, fire destroyed the former station building. The next year, Jack Murphy rolled the water tower 15 metres (50 ft) northward onto his property. The double-spouted structure is believed to be one of only two left in North America. In 1989, a caboose donated by the Nicola Valley Museum and Archives in Merritt was railed to Brookmere to join the water tower. That May, CP ran the final freight train through Brookmere.

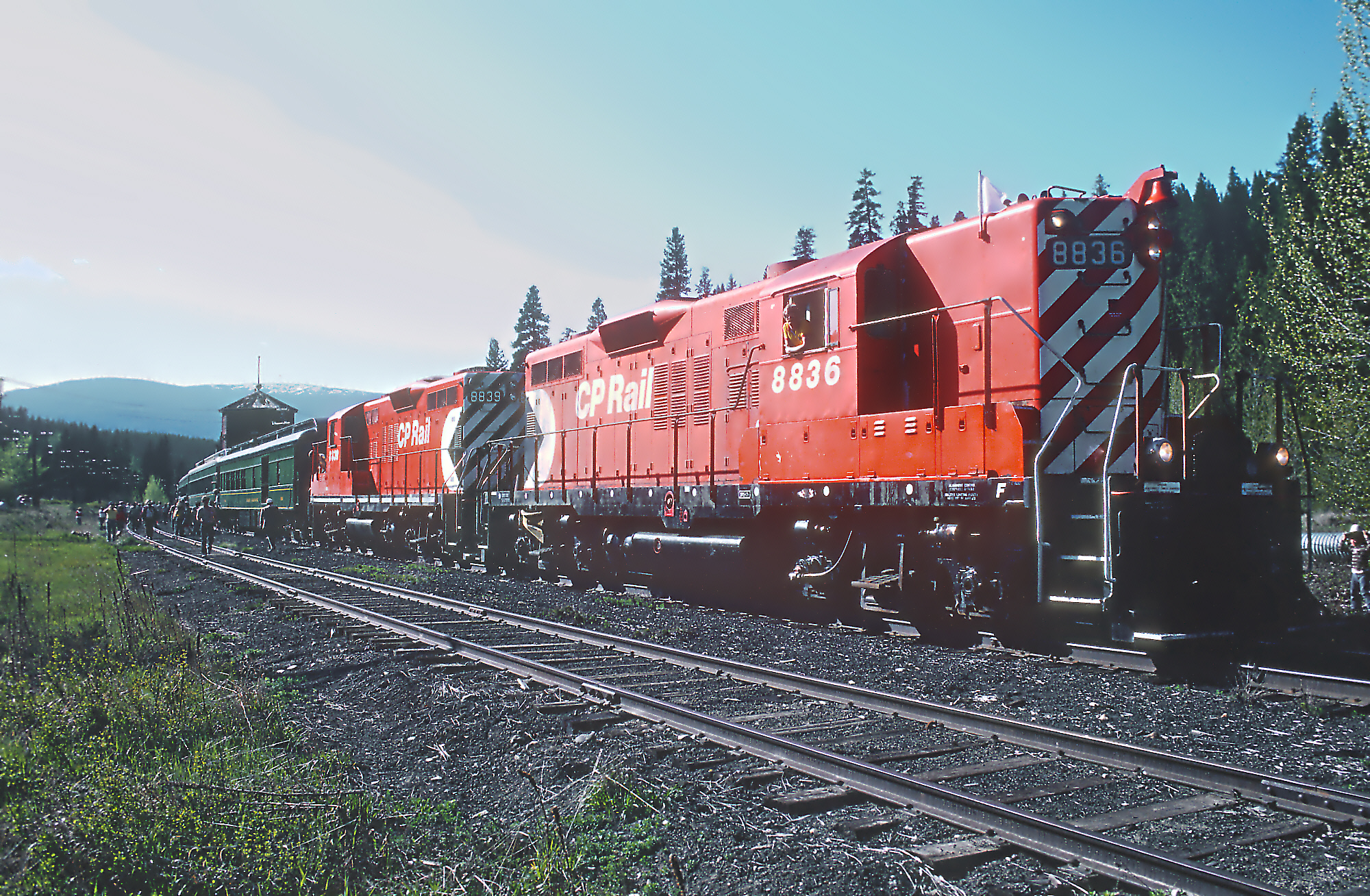
Passenger excursion, Brookmere, 1983

In 1991, 83 former railway employees, a few former pipeline employees, friends, and families, made up a total of about 150 for a weekend reunion at Brookmere. The remainder of the abandoned track southeast of Spences Bridges had been lifted two weeks earlier.

In 2000, this stretch of the Kettle Valley Rail Trail segment of the Trans Canada Trail opened along the former railway right-of-way.

In 2015, the annual railway reunions were discontinued.

== Earlier community ==
In 1915, the Betterton Fraser Land Co, owner of the Hastings Ranch, acquired the townsite, erected a sawmill, and installed a waterworks and electrical plant to supply the mill and residences. That year, C.L. Betterton cut only sufficient lumber for his personal use. The next year, the mill began filling the large contracts, and C.R. Betterton opened the Brookmere Hotel, a temperance establishment. The general store, likely established around this time, was on the premises. The post office existed 1916–1969. The sawmill operated at least until late 1917. In 1919, the Nicola Pine Mills, whose plant at Canford Mill was destroyed by fire, leased the 6,100 to 7,600 metres (20,000 to 25,000 ft) per day capacity Brookmere mill, which produced rough lumber for the company's planing mill at Merritt.

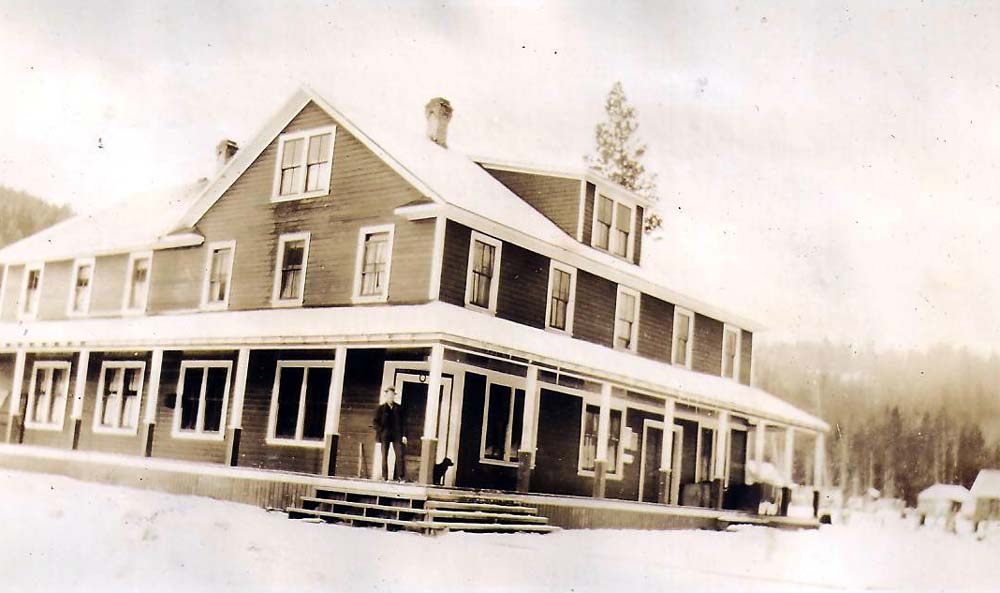
Brookmere Hotel, 1920

In 1920, the school opened. In 1924, fire destroyed the Brookmere mill.

In 1931, when a forest fire came within a mile, residents placed their possessions beside boxcars ready for evacuation, but a cloudburst and the efforts of all available men in the area halted the flames. In 1935, fire consumed the two-storey hotel. On the ground floor were the store/post office, dining room, and kitchen.

During the mid-1940s, the Geddes lumber mill operated. Many Japanese Canadians from internment camps worked at the mill at the end of World War II, and for a short period, Japanese students made up a significant portion of the school population. In 1946, the community hall opened. On 33 properties owned by the Ryder Estate, tenants erected houses and paid land rental prior to World War II. In 1947, residents bought these lots in a tax sale. In 1949, the school purchased a teacherage and rented an extra classroom. About this time, the Brookmere population reached a peak of around 170, before gradually reducing as diesels replaced steam locomotives.

In 1953, the Trans Mountain Pipeline built eight houses for workers at Brookmere, which had been selected as one of the construction bases along the pipeline route. These fully serviced residences were arranged in a wide semicircle. In 1954, the teacherage was wired for electricity. In 1955, the school district acquired additional property, commenced construction, and opened the new two-classroom prefabricated building. That year, the teacherage was reroofed and the exterior painted. By the late 1950s, a hardware store with an Esso gas bar also existed.

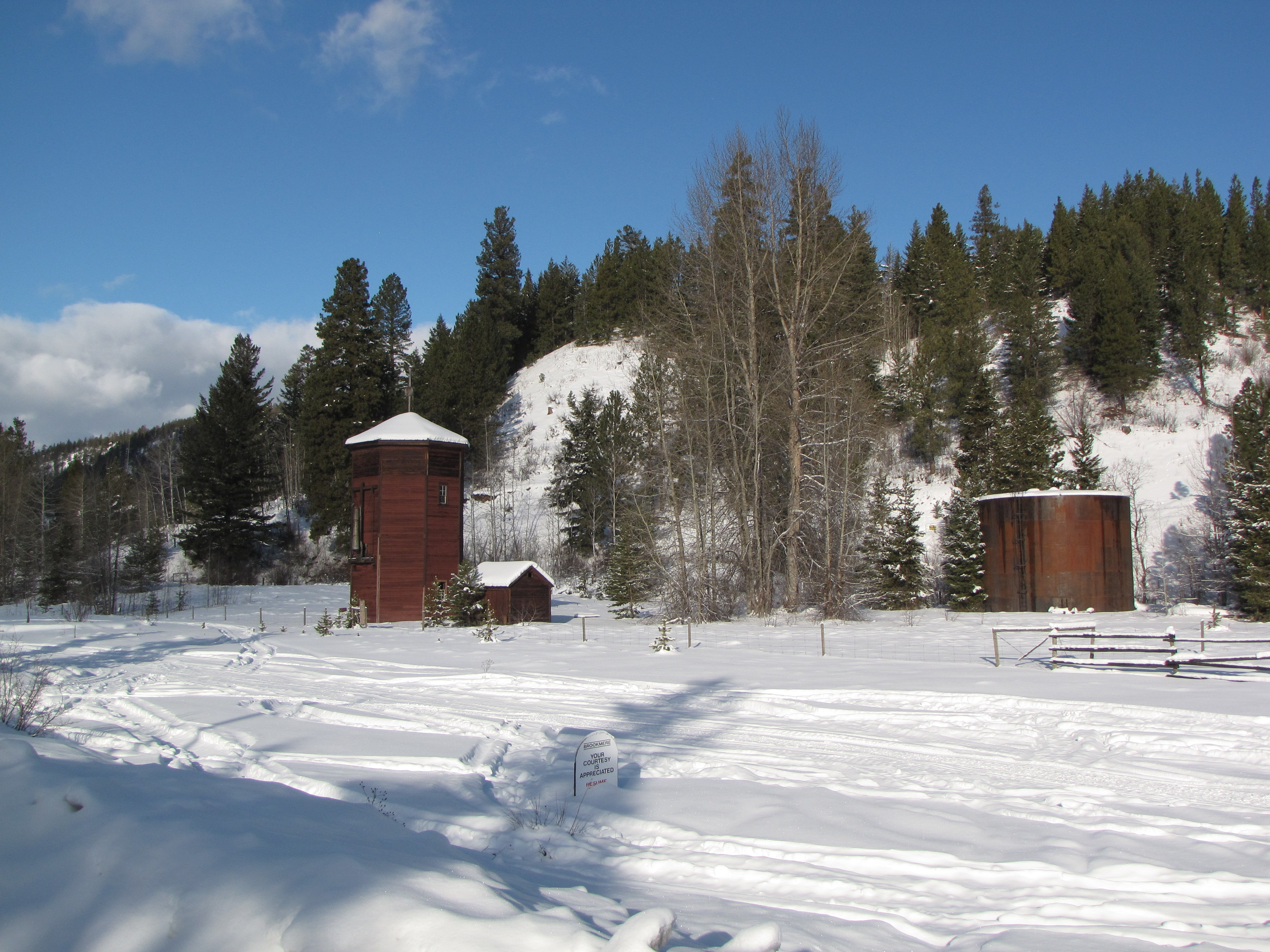
Railway water tower, Brookmere, 2010

A National Forest Products mill operated in the early 1960s. BC Hydro transmission lines reached the community in 1965. The school closed in 1966 when the pipeline company moved out of Brookmere. The next year, six company houses were sold and the buildings transported to Merrit.

When the roof of the community hall collapsed in 1975, the vacant school building assumed this social role.

By 1980, the permanent population was 11. During that decade, a mix of retired people and self-employed artisans sustained the community, and the permanent population rose to 27. In 1988, the general store closed.

In 1999, Barrie Sanford, author of several railway books, settled.

== Main roads ==
In 1925, the Brookmere road opened westward from the Coalmont road, ending railway access only.

In 1951, the province promised to extend the Kingsvale road the remaining 11 kilometres (7 mi) eastward to Brookmere. When the pipeline company built the connection in 1953, the public were given access to this private road. By 1956, the road along the east shore of the Coldwater River had been extended southward to Brookmere.

In 1969, the province purchased the Kingsvale–Brookmere private road.

In the 1980s, the Kingsvale–Brookmere road became an interchange on the Coquihalla Highway. However, the former remained unpaved until the 2000s.

== Later community ==
By the early 2000s, Brookmere was known as a gateway to the Thynne Mountain trails. The heritage trail was largely used by noisy and fast snowmobiles and ATVs. In 2004, despite local opposition, the TNRD approved the Marshall Springs Resort project overlooking Brookmere. The Nicola Valley Explorers Club (NVEC) maintained the Brookmere–old Coquihalla toll-booth leg of the rail trail.

Comprising 178 partially serviced lots for log homes but lacking a central amenity, such as a lake, golf course or ski resort, the Marshall Springs project went into receivership in 2009. Owed over $5.3 million and not a single property sale, the secured creditors were Coast Capital Savings for $4 million and Fisgard Capital Corp for $625,000. The unsecured creditors totalled $750,000. Marked down to $3.5 million, the 36-hectare (90-acre) property sought a buyer, but the final sales price is unknown.

In 2021, the Brookmere Property Owners Association Board requested that the former schoolhouse be donated to the association. Most of the 16 full time homeowners were over the age of 70. Recreational owners, who totalled 18, sometimes visited. The TNRD issued an evacuation order when Brook Creek spilled its banks during the 2021 Pacific Northwest floods. The fast flowing water, silt, and debris, extensively damaged homes and outbuildings.
