= North Bend station =

Railway station in British Columbia, Canada

North Bend

General information
- Location: North Bend, BC; Canada
- Coordinates: 49°53′36.721″N 121°27′58.762″W
- Platforms: 1 side platform
- Tracks: 2

Construction
- Structure type: Sign post

Services
Preceding station	Via Rail	Following station
Katz One-way operation	The Canadian	Ashcroft toward Toronto

Former services
Preceding station	Canadian Pacific Railway	Following station
China Bar toward Vancouver	Main Line	Chaumox toward Montreal Windsor
Location
- Location within British Columbia Location within Canada

North Bend station is a railway station in North Bend, British Columbia, Canada, located at the border between CPR's Cascade and Thompson subdivision.

The station is served by Via Rail's Canadian train as a flag stop (48 hours advance notice required). The station is only served by eastbound trains towards Toronto. Westbound trains call at Boston Bar railway station along the CN Railway tracks, on the other side of the Fraser River. This split in service between Vancouver and Ashcroft is due to CN and CPR utilizing directional running through the Thompson and Fraser Canyon.
