= Coldwater River Provincial Park =

Provincial park in British Columbia, Canada

- IUCN category II (national park)
- Location within British Columbia
- Interactive map of Coldwater River Provincial Park
- Location: Yale Division Yale Land District, British Columbia, Canada
- Nearest city: Hope, BC
- Coordinates: 49°44′07″N 121°00′30″W
- Area: 69 ha (170 acres)
- Established: May 15, 1986
- Governing body: BC Parks

Coldwater River Provincial Park is a provincial park in British Columbia, Canada, located at the confluence of the Coldwater River with Cullet Creek, 50 km south of Merritt on BC Highway 5.
