= Kamloops North station =

Railway station in British Columbia, Canada

Kamloops North
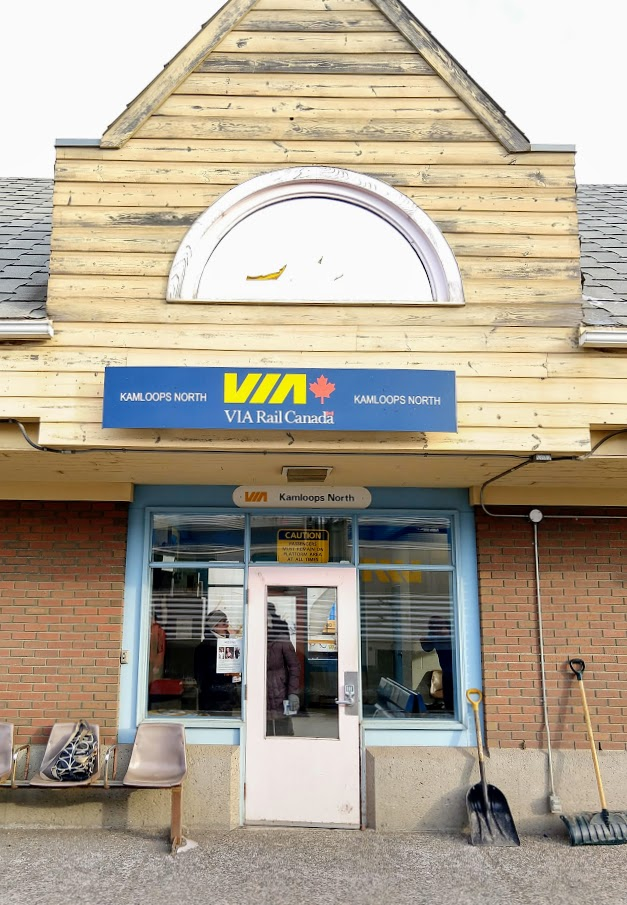

General information
- Location: Yellowhead Highway 5 Kamloops, BC, Canada
- Coordinates: 50°43′06″N 120°20′54″W
- Platforms: 1 side platform
- Tracks: 2

Construction
- Parking: yes

Other information
- Status: Unstaffed station

History
- Former names: Kamloops Junction

Services
Preceding station	Via Rail	Following station
Ashcroft toward Vancouver	The Canadian	Clearwater toward Toronto
Former services
Preceding station	Canadian National Railway	Following station
Halston toward Vancouver	Main Line	Rayleigh toward Montreal
Terminus	Kamloops Branch	Kamloops toward Kelowna
Location
- Location within British Columbia Location within Canada

Kamloops North station is a railway station in Thompson-Nicola Regional District serving the north end of Kamloops, British Columbia, Canada. It is on the Canadian National Railway mainline and is located at the Canadian National Railway Yards. The station is served by Via Rail's Canadian train. It is bordered to the east and west by Tkʼemlúps te Secwépemc.

== See also ==
- Kamloops station, a now-closed station in downtown Kamloops
