= Coldwater River (British Columbia) =

Coldwater River Ntstlatko
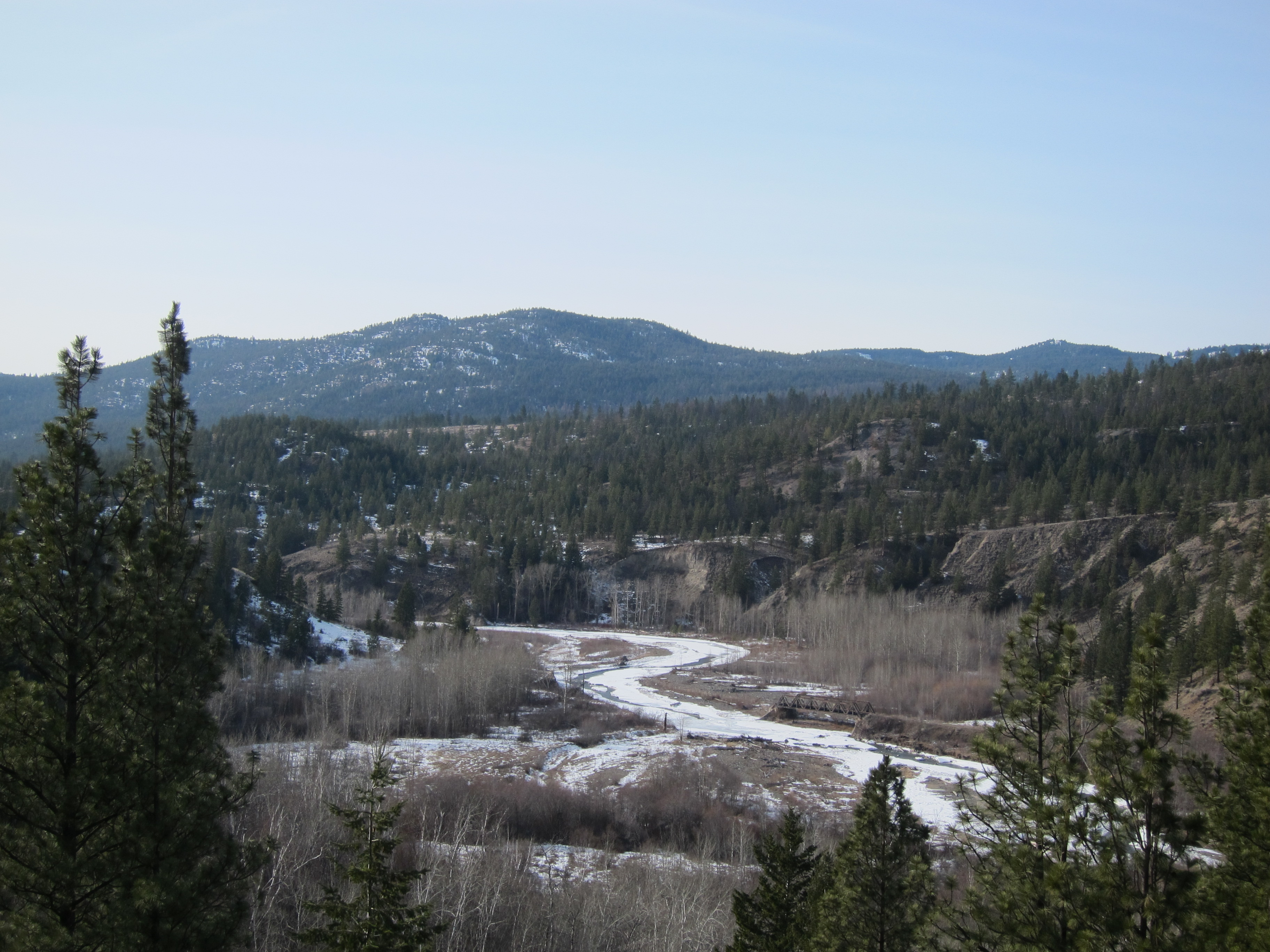
- Coldwater River near Merritt, 2012

- Location within British Columbia
- Etymology: Shuswap for "cold water"

Location
- Country: Canada
- Province: British Columbia
- Regional district: Thompson–Nicola

Physical characteristics
- Source: Zupkios Peak
  - location: Cascade Mountains
  - coordinates: 49°37′34″N 121°8′52″W
  - elevation: 1,344 m (4,409 ft)
- Mouth: Nicola River
  - location: Merritt, Nicola Valley
  - coordinates: 50°06′52″N 120°48′15″W
  - elevation: 583 m (1,913 ft)
- Length: 94 km (58 mi)
- Basin size: 915 km^{2} (353 sq mi)

The Coldwater River is in south central British Columbia, Canada. The river is the largest tributary of the Nicola River, which is joined at Merritt.

== Name origin ==
Tsillatko (or alternative spellings), the Shuswap name for the river, translates to "cold water". The earliest known documented use of the Coldwater River name is 1875. G.M. Dawson's Southern Interior of B.C. map (1877) is the earliest map adopting this name.

== Course and environment ==
The source is west of the Coquihalla Lakes on the northeastern slopes of the North Cascades. From there it flows northeastward, to form the valley followed by British Columbia Highway 5, the Trans Mountain Pipeline and, historically the Kettle Valley Railway. The route includes the Coldwater River Park (near Juliet) and Coldwater, the main reservation of the Coldwater First Nation. There is only one canyon (7-kilometre (4 mi) length, north of Brodie). The river ends where it enters the Nicola at Merritt.

Water temperature does not rise above 10 °C (50 °F) until early July, whereas in the Nicola, water exceeds that by early June. The average gradient of the lower 90 kilometres (56 mi) is 0.6 per cent. The watershed area covers 915 square kilometres (226,000 acres). Annual precipitation in the upper watershed is 1,000 millimetres (39 in) and at Merritt is 255 millimetres (10 in).

The watershed is snow dominated with summer low flows occurring late August–September and late winter. Commercial and industrial land use, which is primarily in Merritt, impacts about 1.0 per cent on both banks of the river. Upstream, agricultural land use occupies 3.7 per cent of both banks. Rural land use occurs along about 11.2 per cent of the left bank, and 23 per cent of the right bank. Infrastructure accounts for about 3.2 per cent and 4.4 per cent of the left and right banks respectively, which is largely a result of the 24 bridges along the river. The length is about 94 kilometres (58 mi) and channel width is 10 to 25 metres (33 to 82 ft).

Along the cobble-bedded, irregularly meandering river, abandoned channels have created low-lying areas of wetland. Valley walls are primarily formed of till overlying bedrock. The installation of revetments over the past century has restricted the meandering. The river passes through two biogeoclimatic zones. In the upper reaches, it passes through the Interior Douglas Fir Zone. On entering the Coldwater Valley bottom, the region changes to the drier Ponderosa Pine/Bunch Grass Zone.

== Discharge ==
Daily discharge tables for the Coldwater River at:
Brook Creek mouth for 1965–2022.
Merritt for 1913–2022.

== Tributaries ==
Mapped tributaries total 85.

Major Tributaries
Creek Name	Upstream^{a}	Flows	Length	Width		Gradient	Comments	Ref.
Creek Name	Upstream^{a}	Flows	Length	From	To	Gradient	Comments	Ref.
Midday	25 km (16 mi)	southwest	11.1 km (6.9 mi)	8 m (26 ft)	12 m (39 ft)	2.8%	runs almost dry in Aug and Sep.	
Voght	35 km (22 mi)	west	23.5 km (14.6 mi)	8 m (26 ft)	12 m (39 ft)	2.1%	impassable waterfall at .85 km (0.53 mi)	
Brook	38 km (24 mi)	west	19.2 km (11.9 mi)	2 m (7 ft)	8 m (26 ft)	5.3%	possesses two distinct reaches.	
Bottletop	58 km (36 mi)	southeast	4.0 km (2.5 mi)	1 m (3 ft)	4 m (13 ft)	3.0%	impassable culvert at 125 m (410 ft)	
Juliet	61 km (38 mi)	southeast	14.0 km (8.7 mi)	2 m (7 ft)	6 m (20 ft)	3.9%	one of the largest tributaries.	
July	61 km (38 mi)	southeast	8.5 km (5.3 mi)	1 m (3 ft)	4 m (13 ft)	7.5%	flows into Juliet	
Mine	67 km (42 mi)	east	7.0 km (4.3 mi)	1 m (3 ft)	2 m (7 ft)	7.4%	impassable waterfalls from 2 km (1.2 mi)	
Godey	4 km (2 mi)	northwest	5.6 km (3.5 mi)			7.1%		
Kwinshatin	12 km (7 mi)	northwest	3.1 km (1.9 mi)			3.8%		
Castillon	18 km (11 mi)	northwest	4.5 km (2.8 mi)			11.5%		
Salem	25 km (16 mi)	west	5.0 km (3.1 mi)	1 m (3 ft)	2 m (7 ft)	14.8%		
Gillis	32 km (20 mi)	east	4.0 km (2.5 mi)	1 m (3 ft)	2 m (7 ft)	8.5%	flows from Gillis Lake.	
Kingsvale	33 km (21 mi)	east	6.5 km (4.0 mi)	1 m (3 ft)	2 m (7 ft)	12.3%		
Fig Lake	35 km (22 mi)	northeast	3.4 km (2.1 mi)	1 m (3 ft)	2 m (7 ft)	9.4%	flows from Fig Lake.	
Shouz	36 km (22 mi)	west	3.6 km (2.2 mi)	1 m (3 ft)	2 m (7 ft)	8.3%		
LIttle Douglas	79 km (49 mi)	north	2.8 km (1.7 mi)	1 m (3 ft)	2 m (7 ft)	4.3%	flows from Little Douglas Lake.	

^a. Distance upstream from the mouth of the Coldwater River.

== Fish species ==
Main Species
	Distribution	Ideal Conditions	Immigrate	Spawn	Develop	Migrate	Ref.
Coho salmon	principally upstream of Midday Creek	low velocity sidechannels, backchannels, and ponds	mid-Sep–early Dec	Oct–Dec	full year	May–Jun	
Chinook salmon	throughout Coldwater system	low velocity backwaters	May–Jul	Jul–Sep	full year	May–Jul	
Steelhead	lower Coldwater (below KIngsvale)	high velocity with course cobble/boulder substrate	Apr–Jun	May–Jun	2–3 years	May–Jun	
Bull trout	upstream of Midday Creek			Aug–Sep			
Mountain whitefish	throughout Coldwater system						
Bridgelip sucker	lower reaches of the Coldwater system						
Longnose dace	lower reaches of the Coldwater system						
Prickly sculpin	throughout Coldwater system						

Other species include Pacific lamprey, river lamprey, and Western brook lamprey.

== First Nations ==
Nlaka'pamux First Nations have inhabited the Coldwater valley at least since the early 1800s. The main reserve of the Coldwater Band is Coldwater 1. Paul's Basin IR 2 is southwest of IR 1 and Gwen Lake 3 is on Gwen Lake, which feeds Kwinshatin Creek.

== Roads and trails ==
In 1848 and 1849, the Hudson's Bay Company (HBC) tried a new Kamloops–Yale trail, which was ultimately rejected as overly arduous and hazardous. This Hudson's Bay Brigade Trail was via Nicola Lake, the Coldwater River, the mountains, Chapmans, and the Fraser River.

Developed during 1872–1876, a 2-metre (6 ft) wide upgraded cattle trail, which connected Hope and Merritt via the Coquihalla Pass, was destroyed in the 1910s by the Kettle Valley Railway (KV) construction.

In 1910, a new wagon road was built along the Voght Valley, which included the corresponding part along the east shore of the Coldwater from Merritt.

By 1931, a minor road headed westward to Brookmere.

By 1956, the road along the east shore had been extended to Brookmere.

In 1960, Trans Mountain Pipeline bought the Brodie–Jessica right-of-way. and built a private road north from Portia largely upon the former rail bed. In summer 1963, a passenger vehicle convoy made a promotional public use of the Brookmere–Portia route, which comprised the private pipeline road and logging roads. The tenth such annual excursion in 1973 appears to have been the last. By the mid-1970s, the public use of this road was increasing. Consequently, petitioning for the long promised highway intensified.

In May 1985, a tanker spilled about 500 litres (110 imp gal; 132 US gal) of diesel fuel, which flowed into the river. The respective Coquihalla Highway contractor was later acquitted on a charge of negligence. By that summer, the public could use the highway while earthmovers developed the grade. Opened in May 1986, the highway parallels the river for almost 39 kilometres (24 mi). Construction required six bridges and three river diversions. The lower reaches of Juliet and Mine creeks were also impacted. The Ministry of Transportation and Highways installed several compensating river channels for spawning.

== Pipelines ==
In 1953, the Trans Mountain Oil Pipe Line was installed along the river. In 1955, a pipeline easement through the reserve was granted to Trans-Mountain Oil Pipeline Ltd.

The Westcoast Pipeline, which carries natural gas, was completed through the Coldwater and Coquihalla valleys in 1957 and expanded in 1979.

In April 1971, a washout left 61 metres (200 ft) of pipeline suspended. On fracturing, the pipe leaked crude oil, which was contained behind a quickly prepared earth dam. During repairs, the greater part of the 950,000 litres; 250,000 US gallons (210,000 imp gal) of released oil entered the dam, but none reached the river. Over the decades, the pipeline companies modified extensive sections of the Coldwater River to protect the buried pipe from river scour.

The Trans Mountain Expansion Project route was revised in 2021 when the Coldwater Band claimed that the original proposal might potentially damage the reserve aquifer. The change added about 4 kilometres (2 mi), necessitated two crossings of the Coldwater River where none were needed before, and raised further concerns about the local environmental impact. By February 2024, the project was almost complete along the river between Merritt and the Coquihalla Summit.

== Flooding ==
During May–June 1948, the rising river at the Collettsville Bridge flooded residences.

In February 1962, a blockage from broken ice caused the river to flood basements.

In late December 1980, the largest recorded floods to that time changed the river channel morphology, which prompted revisions of the draft study examining the expected impact upon the river of the proposed Coquihalla Highway. The flooding caused extensive damage to roads and bridges and the loss of farmland.

The river flooded parts of Merritt due to very high water in 1995 and an ice jam in 2005.

During the 2021 Pacific Northwest floods, the river damaged the Merritt wastewater treatment plant, about 600 residences, and several commercial properties. The entire community of 7,100 residents had to be evacuated. Upstream, workers were able to save the highway bridge at Brodie by dumping rock to protect an abutment. Along a 30-kilometre (19 mi) stretch south of Merritt, the 14 exposed sections of the existing oil pipeline cost tens of millions of dollars to repair and route revisions were required for the expansion project where river channels had altered.

== Former railway trackage ==
The Kettle Valley Railway, a Canadian Pacific Railway subsidiary, operated standard gauge trackage, which followed the Coldwater River (via the Brodie junction) and the Coquihalla River through the North Cascades.

== See also ==
- List of rivers of British Columbia
- Coquihalla railway link
