= Coquihalla Canyon Provincial Park =

Provincial park in British Columbia, Canada

Coquihalla Canyon Park
- IUCN category III (natural monument or feature)
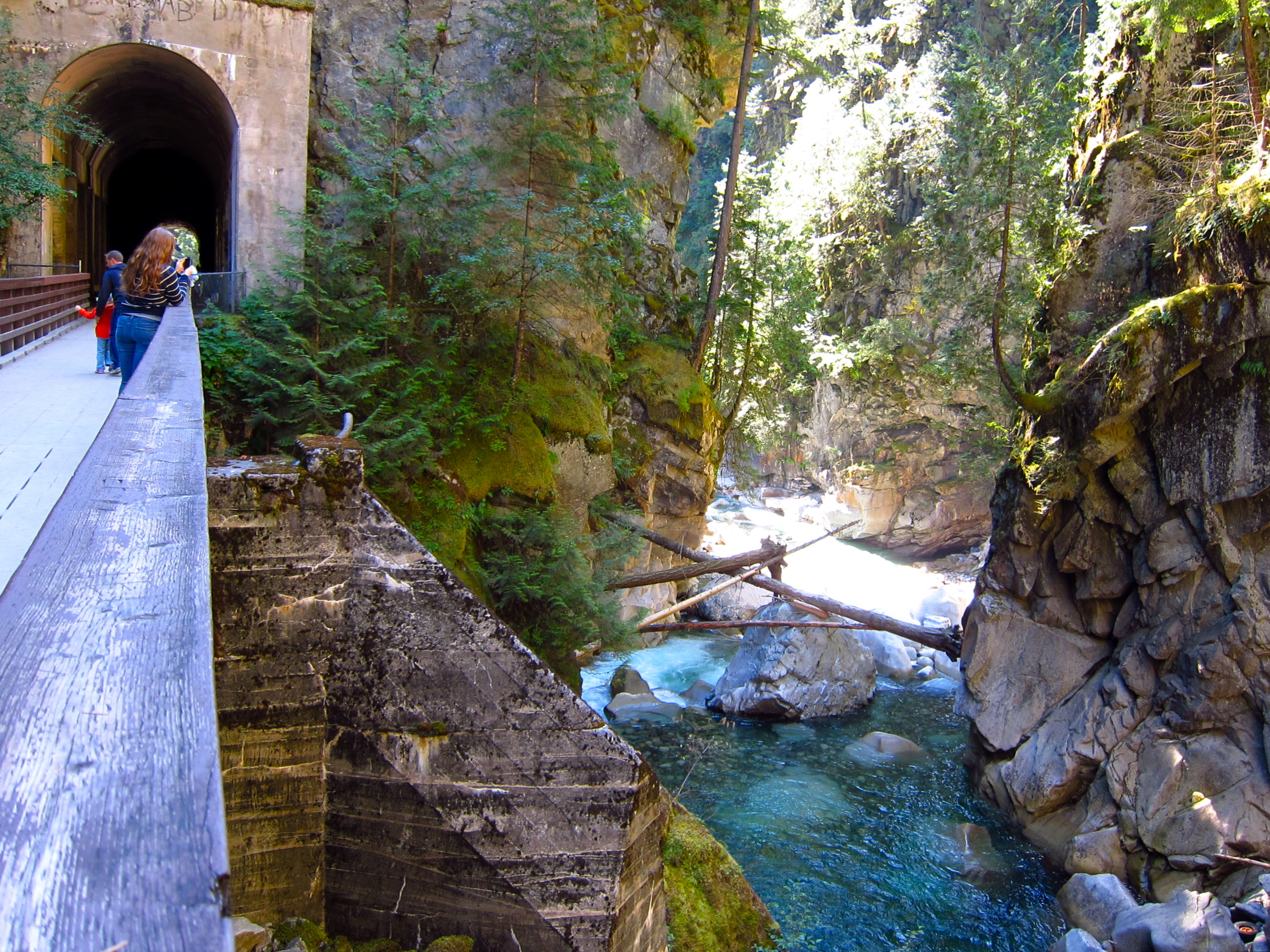
- Tunnel #12 and the river, Othello, 2011

- Location within British Columbia
- Interactive map of Coquihalla Canyon Park
- Location: Hope, British Columbia, Canada
- Coordinates: 49°22′12″N 121°22′16″W
- Area: 159 ha (390 acres)
- Established: May 15, 1986
- Governing body: BC Parks

Coquihalla Canyon Park is on the north shore of the Coquihalla River in southwestern British Columbia. This provincial park includes the Othello Tunnels to the east and the mouth of the Nicolum River to the south. The tunnels were part of the Kettle Valley Railway (KV). Off Othello Rd, the locality is by road about 8 kilometres (5 mi) east of Hope.

== Physiography ==
Granite batholiths intrude from the metamorphic rock formed from the earlier sedimentary rock and volcanic rock. Erosion and the rock composition cause the 100-metre (328 ft) deep canyon walls to continually fragment. The winding river creates cascades and rapids through the narrow gorge. Large seasonal fluctuations in water levels can cause log jams.

== Pioneer trail ==
Side hill cuts in the park area evidence the former Hope–Nicola cattle trail, which may have existed as early as 1846 but was substantially upgraded by the province in the mid-1870s. A timber trestle crossed the river where the canyon width narrowed to 3 metres (10 ft). The opening of the Canadian Pacific Railway (CP) main line up the Fraser Canyon in the mid-1880s diminished the trail use basically to herding horses by 1889. After destruction by the KV construction in the mid-1910s, this trail was abandoned.

== Railway ==
=== Othello Station ===
The KV was a CP subsidiary. In May 1915, the eastward advance of the KV rail head from the CN/KV crossing at Hope reached about 5 kilometres (3 mi) beyond Othello.

The naming of stations from Juliet west to Othello after characters in William Shakespeare's plays is generally attributed to Andrew McCulloch, the chief engineer and a Shakespeare enthusiast. Suggested alternative bestowers have been James J. Warren, the Kettle Valley Railway president, or one of the daughters of these men.

Tunnels Rd runs along the former right-of-way. Once standing about 100 metres (328 ft) before the northward bend into the visitor carpark, the station comprised a small freight/passenger shelter. Passenger service began in July 1916. The section house, likely built in 1915, was swept downstream and destroyed by the floods in 1924 and 1932. A section crew was based at Othello 1916–1959.

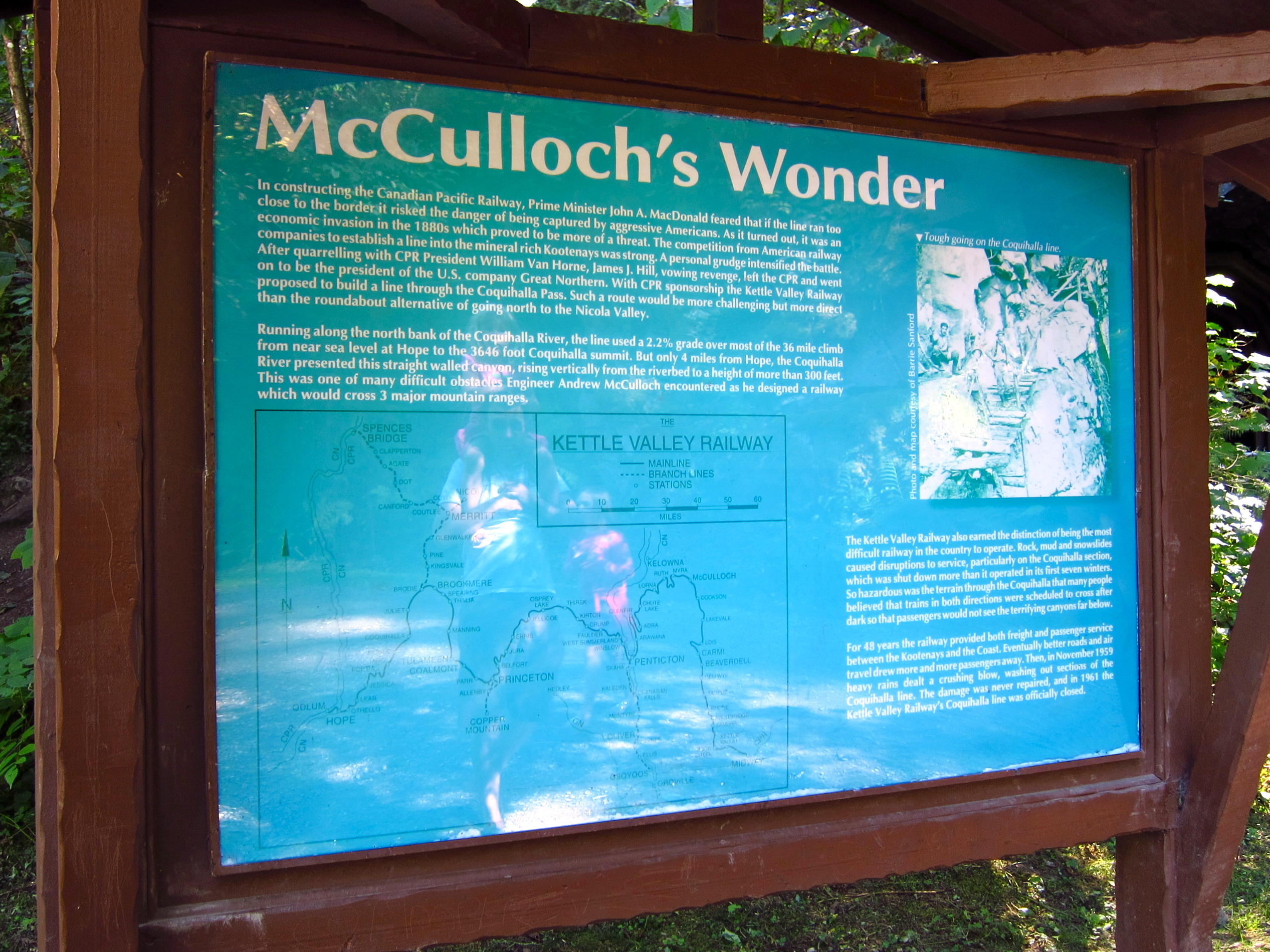
Signboard, Othello Tunnels, 2011

Following extensive rail bed and bridge destruction within the canyon caused by floods, November 1959 was the final passenger service at Othello. The Coquihalla rail line was effectively abandoned and the tracks lifted in 1961 and 1962.

=== Othello Tunnels and bridges ===
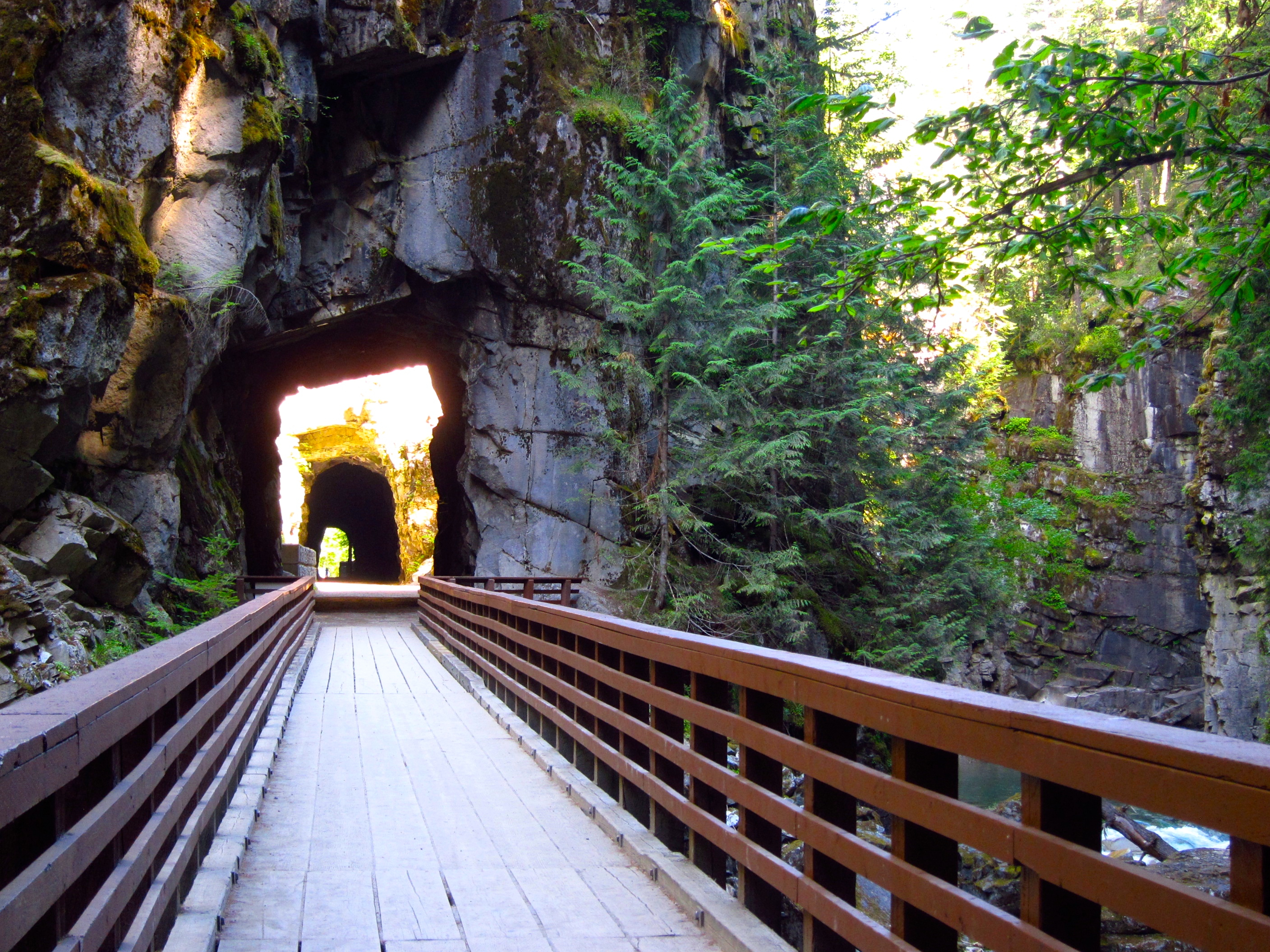
Northwestward to Tunnels #11 and #10, Othello Tunnels, 2013

To avoid the time and expense of producing a 1.6-kilometre (1 mi) tunnel along this winding stretch of river, Andrew McCulloch and his surveyors were lowered in wicker baskets to determine a more economical route. Using cliff ladders, suspension bridges, and ropes, workers excavated the parts simultaneously to create this series of tunnels in a straight line.

Tunnel #10 was 169 metres (556 ft) with timber lining. Tunnel #11 was 30 metres (100 ft) through solid rock. The adjacent river bridge was a 23-metre (75 ft 6 in) steel half deck plate girder span, which was removed in 1961. Tunnel #12 was 123 metres (405 ft) through solid rock. A short chunk of the west wall blew out during construction creating an illusion of two tunnels. A concrete portal was added at the east end in 1958–59. The adjacent river bridge was a 53-metre (174 ft 3 in) steel deck lattice truss span. Tunnel #13 was 84 metres (276 ft) through solid rock. The concrete portal added at the west end in 1941 was lengthened in 1952.

== Provincial Park ==
=== Prior developments ===
In 1964, a recreational reserve designation was placed upon the area, which had been primarily used by local residents and as a fishing location. To promote the tourism potential, the Hope Chamber of Commerce received a $70,000 provincial grant in 1985 to enhance the tunnels. In addition, army personnel installed a suspension bridge across the gap between Tunnels #11 and #12. In April 1986, army personnel renovated the bridge between Tunnels #12 and #13. Missing steel beams were replaced, old decking removed, and new decking and handrails installed.

=== Establishment and enhancements ===
In May 1986, the province established the 135-hectare (334-acre) Coquihalla Canyon Recreation Area. At that time, the tunnels were designated a national historic site. That year, a 21-vehicle parking lot, pit toilets and an information shelter were built. Installed less than two years earlier, the suspension bridge was replaced in 1987 by a rigid structure to provide wheelchair accessibility.

The footprint was 151.3 hectares (374 acres) when the designation changed to the Coquihalla Canyon Park in 1997 and 159 hectares (393 acres) when the boundary expanded in 2004.

In December 2001, a new parking lot was completed, which included 50 spaces for cars, 17 for RVs, and 9 for buses.

The Kettle Valley Rail Trail segment of the Trans Canada Trail follows the former KV right-of-way.

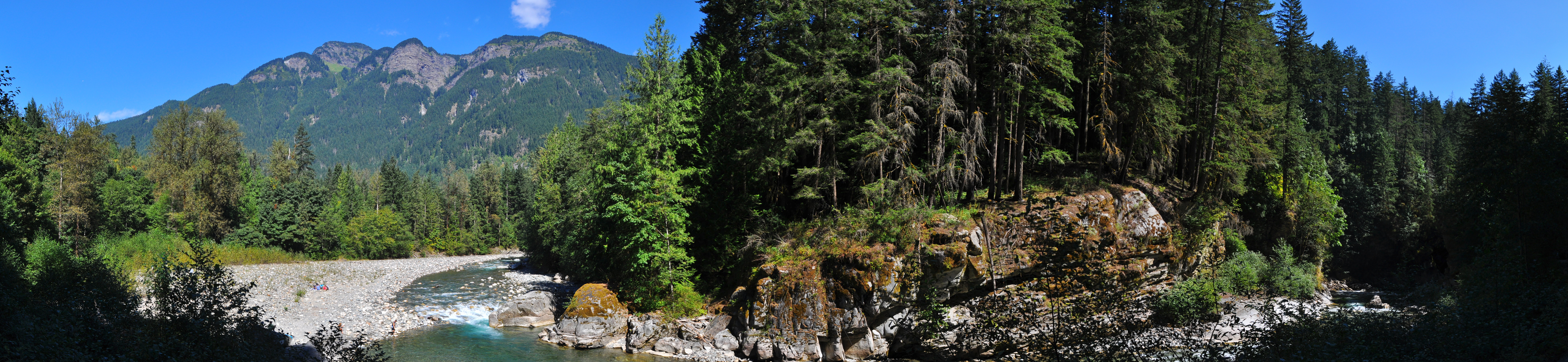
Northeastward view on the trail from the carpark, Othello Tunnels, 2012

=== Maintenance ===
During flooding in November 1990, water flowed through Tunnels #10 and #11, dumping debris. Picnic tables, pathway gravel, and parts of the rail bed were washed away. By the following May, the worst of the devastation had been repaired. The December 1995 flood caused similar damage.

In 2005, extensive rock scaling and stabilization of the cliffs and rebuilds of the pedestrian bridges cost about $400,000.

In July 2014, when structural damage to the foundation of the bridge between Tunnels #11 and #12 was discovered, the span closed to the public. A trail was soon developed, which provided a bypass around the problem area until the bridge reopened the following May.

The 2021 Pacific Northwest floods extensively damaged the tunnels and undermined bridge foundations and slope stability in the steep canyon. For safety reasons, the tunnels were immediately closed to the public, while restoration, estimated to cost $4.5 million was undertaken. Wire mesh barriers, rock bolts, and some shotcrete have been inserted in Tunnel #10 and along the adjacent slopes to reduce and catch falling material. Tunnels #10 and #11 reopened mid-August 2024. Following bridge repairs, the whole tunnel route will reopen summer 2025.

== Television and film ==
- The National Dream (1974 TV mini-series).
- First Blood (1982).
- Fire with Fire (1986).
- Captive Hearts (1987).
- Shoot to Kill (1988).
- Far from Home: The Adventures of Yellow Dog (1995).
- Afghan Knights (2007).
- Cabin in the Woods (2011).
- War for the Planet of the Apes (2017).

== See also ==
- Coquihalla railway link
- Coquihalla River Provincial Park
