= Boston Bar station =

Railway station in British Columbia, Canada

Boston Bar

General information
- Location: Boston Bar, BC; Canada
- Coordinates: 49°52′9.811″N 121°26′40.772″W
- Platforms: 1 side platform
- Tracks: 2p

Construction
- Structure type: Sign post

Services
Preceding station	Via Rail	Following station
Hope toward Vancouver	The Canadian	Ashcroft One-way operation
Former services
Preceding station	Via Rail	Following station
Hope toward Vancouver	Super Continental	Lytton toward Toronto
Preceding station	Canadian National Railway	Following station
Gorge toward Vancouver	Main Line	Boothroyd toward Montreal
Location
- Location within British Columbia Location within Canada

Boston Bar station is a railway station in Boston Bar, British Columbia, Canada, located at the border of CN's Ashcroft subdivision.

The station is served by Via Rail's The Canadian as a flag stop (48-hour advance notice required). The station is only served by westbound trains towards Vancouver. Eastbound trains call at North Bend railway station along the CPR tracks, on the other side of the Fraser River. This split in service between Vancouver and Ashcroft is due to CN and CPR utilizing directional running through the Thompson- and Fraser Canyon.
