= Katz, British Columbia =

Katz
- Location of Katz in British Columbia
- Coordinates: 49°22′00″N 121°33′00″W
- Country: Canada
- Province: British Columbia

Katz is a locality in the Eastern Fraser Valley region of British Columbia, Canada. It is to the east of the extremity of the District of Kent at Ruby Creek British Columbia. It consists of a flag stop on the Canadian Pacific Railway on Chawathil Indian Reserve No. 4. British Columbia Highway 7 parallels the CPR in this area.

== Train service ==
Only eastbound trains stop at the station, which is part of the VIA Rail transnational route. Passengers desiring to go westbound must embark at Hope, British Columbia.

Services
- Preceding station	Via Rail	Following station
  Agassiz One-way operation	The Canadian	North Bend toward Toronto
