= Hope station (British Columbia) =

Railway station in British Columbia, Canada

Hope
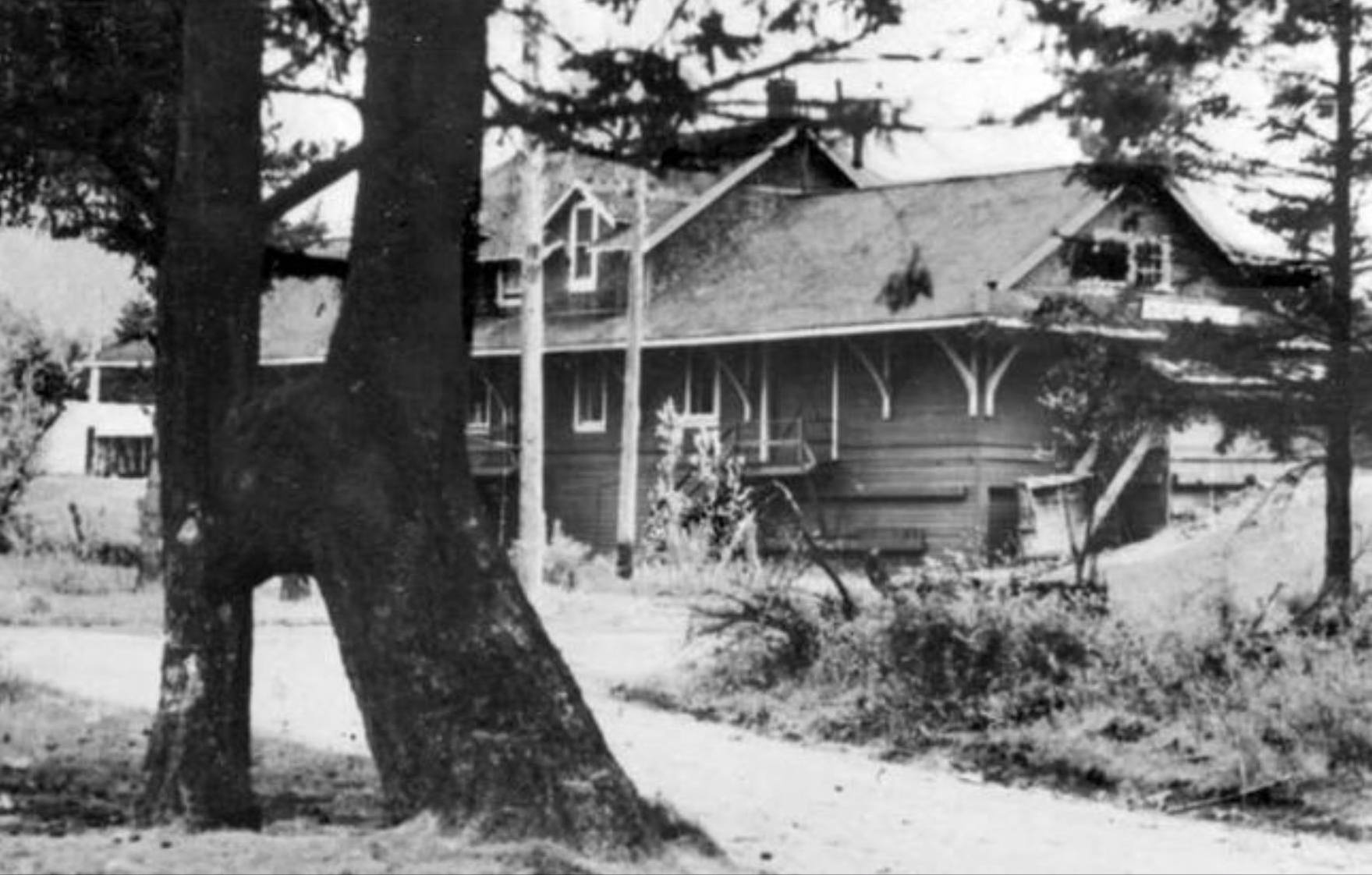
- CN station, Hope, 1928

General information
- Location: 6th Ave. and Fort St. Hope, BC; Canada
- Coordinates: 49°22′51″N 121°26′04″W
- Platforms: none
- Tracks: 1

Construction
- Structure type: sign post

Services
Preceding station	Via Rail	Following station
Chilliwack toward Vancouver	The Canadian	Boston Bar One-way operation
Former services
Preceding station	Via Rail	Following station
Chilliwack toward Vancouver	Super Continental	Boston Bar toward Toronto
Preceding station	Canadian National Railway	Following station
Floods toward Vancouver	Main Line	Trafalgar toward Montreal
Location
- Location within British Columbia

Hope station is a Via Rail flag stop at Hope in southwestern British Columbia, Canada. Formerly, a Canadian National Railway (CN) station stood at this location and a Kettle Valley Railway (KV) one to the northwest.

== CN Hope station ==
In June 1912, the eastward advance of the Canadian Northern Railway (CNo) rail head reached Hope. Built in 1916 between what became 5th Ave and 6th Ave, the station was one of three nearly identical designs by CNo architect John Schofield.

During World War II, the station served as the transfer point for Japanese Canadians being sent to the Tashme Incarceration Camp southeast of Hope or joining the Canadian Pacific Railway (CP) train across the Fraser River for transport to other interior camps.

The CN passing tracks, which were 837 metres (2,747 ft) at Floods, 828 metres (2,718 ft) at Hope, and 687 metres (2,254 ft) at Trafalgar in 1916, have since been consolidated to 1.8 kilometres (6,030 ft) at Floods.

CN and Official Guide Train Timetables (Regular stop or Flag stop)
	Mile	1916	1923	1933	1943	1950	1960	1971	1975
Laidlaw	2846.6	Reg.	Reg.		Flag	Flag			
St. Elmo	2844.7	Reg.	Reg.						
Floods	2841.1	Reg.	Reg.		Flag	Flag			
Hope	2837.2	Reg.	Reg.	Reg.	Both	Both	Flag	Flag	Flag
Trafalgar	2833.0	Reg.	Reg.		Flag	Flag			
Squeah	2828.5		Reg.		Flag	Flag			
Yale	2823.7	Reg.	Reg.		Flag	Flag			

^a. During the 1930s, way-freight service was apparently omitted from the Official Guide timetables.
^b. From April 1960, the next stop westward was Chilliwack and eastward was Boston Bar.

Just north of present Save-On-Foods, the Vancouver, Victoria and Eastern Railway (VV&E), a subsidiary of the Great Northern Railway (GN), built an engine house, which burned down during the 1918–19 winter. GN briefly used the KV facility until GN service east to Hope ceased. GN may have used the CNo station and built the CN wye. GN used the CNo line into Hope from Cannor for a few years. However, the annual fee of $50,000 for access rights to the line continued until the mid-1940s, when a $950,000 payout to CN ended the agreement.

GN Train Timetables (Regular stop or Flag stop)
	Mile	Jun 1916	Nov 1917	Nov 1918	Feb 1919
Hope	94.2		Reg.	Reg.	
Cannor	57.6		Reg.	Reg.	
Kilgard	47.9	Reg.	Reg.	Reg.	Reg.
Abbotsford	42.9	Reg.	Reg.	Reg.	Reg.

In 1985, the abandoned station building was relocated to a BC government property at the corner of Water Ave and Old Hope Princeton Way for use as an arts centre/restaurant. The building had been vacant for several years when the government gave the parcel of land to the Chawathil First Nation in 2021, who wanted the station moved or demolished. At a cost of $120,000 to $140,000, the 238-square-metre (2,567 ft^{2}) building was hauled on a trailer in January 2024 to a permanent site at 919 Water Ave. A $1.8 million restoration will create a museum/visitor centre opening in 2025.

== KV Hope station ==
The KV was a subsidiary of CP. Passenger service began in July 1916 at the station, which stood at the present intersection of Hope St and 3rd Ave. The wye, which existed opposite, comprised a switch in the present alley behind 340 3rd Ave and a three-stall engine house at the tail in the wooded area to the north. The wye was used mostly for turning locomotives and snowplows. Pusher engines were used on the Coquihalla ascent. A water tank stood south of the main line between the western switch and the Water Avenue Bridge. A 73-tonne (80-short-ton) capacity coal chute stood north of the main line between the water tank and station.

The KV station was initially a divisional point and the KV western terminus. CP crews operated trains west of this point. During the 1920s, the station was the terminus for shipping automobiles to/from Princeton. Automobile shipping moved west to Ruby Creek in June 1926. The freight divisional point moved northeast to Brookmere that July, followed by the passenger one in February 1931.

To minimize weight while climbing the Coquihalla during the steam train era, the eastbound passenger train from Vancouver served dinner and dropped off the dining car at Hope. The westbound train collected it at Hope for serving breakfast.

Following extensive rail bed and bridge destruction within the canyon caused by floods, November 1959 was the final passenger service at Hope. The Coquihalla rail line was effectively abandoned and the tracks lifted in 1961 and 1962. Despite the absence of passing trains, the Hope station agency operated until about August 1962. The abandoned station building was removed to the local golf course in 1968, where the derelict structure decayed. The significantly modified residence at 408 3rd Ave was the section house. A section crew was based at Hope until the early 1960s. A freight service was maintained until the rails crossing the Fraser were lifted in 1970.

CP Train Timetables (Regular stop or Flag stop)
	Mile	1916	1919	1929	1932	1935	1939	1943	1948	1954	1959
Ruby Creek	171.3	Reg.	Reg.	Reg.	Both	Reg.	^{a}	Reg.	Reg.	Reg.	Flag
Katz	168.0	Reg.	Flag	Flag	Flag	Flag	^{a}	Flag	Flag	Flag	Flag
Petain	165.0	Reg.	Flag	Reg.	Reg.	Reg.	^{a}				
Odlum	165.0						^{a}	Reg.	Reg.	Reg.	Reg.
Hope	162.7	Reg.	Reg.	Reg.	Reg.	Reg.	^{a}	Reg.	Reg.	Reg	Reg.
CNR Crossing	162.2	Both					^{a}				
Othello	157.2	Flag	Flag		Flag	Flag	^{a}	Flag	Flag	Flag	Flag
Lear	153.3	Flag	Flag		Flag	Flag	^{a}	Flag	Flag	Flag	Flag
Jessica	148.2	Both	Reg.		Flag	Flag	^{a}	Flag	Flag	Flag	Flag
Aurum	146.7					Flag	^{a}	Flag			
Portia	142.6	Flag	Flag	Reg.	Reg.	Reg.	^{a}	Both	Both	Flag	Flag

^a. Routing via Spences Bridge.

== CN/KV crossing ==
The crossing was where a theoretical extension of Wallace St intersects the CN track. In March 1915, the eastward advance of the KV rail head from the CP main line reached this point. However, the last spike on the KVR was not driven until July 1916. Within the southern circular sector surrounding the diamond crossing, the KV erected an interlocking tower, and the GN installed a connection between the intersecting tracks in 1915. Although used only once by GN, this link was maintained by CP to permit CN and CP to divert trains from their respective lines during track blockages. The tower was manned 1915–1952, before an automatic system was installed. In June 1963, a CN crew replaced a damaged section of the diamond with a straight length of rail during emergency repairs, thereby deactivating the diamond. CP chose not to restore the link.

== KV rail bed eastward ==
River Parade leads to the since removed Coquihalla River bridge, which experienced a number of washouts at the western end. The crossing comprised a 40-metre (130 ft) steel though truss span and 76-metre (248 ft) timber frame trestle. Across the river, the Kettle Valley Rail Trail segment of the Trans Canada Trail begins at the parking area of the Thacker Regional Park. The trail continues to the northwestern end of Kettle Valley Road. The Kawkawa flag stop existed September 1922–January 1925 about five houses along in the vicinity of the present BC Hydro utility box, but the stop does not appear in the 1924 timetable. At the southeastern end of the road, the trail resumes to the Othello Tunnels.

== KV mileages ==
Mileages for 1940–1961, measured from the Brookmere Station building, were Kawkawa Lake Road crossing (Mile 52.5), Kawkawa flag stop (Mile 52.8), Coquihalla River bridge (Mile 53.4), CN crossing (Mile 53.7), Hope station (Mile 54.3), and Water Avenue Bridge (Mile 54.7).

== VIA stop ==
Identified by a pole in the ground, the Hope flag stop (48-hour advance notice required) serves Via Rail's The Canadian for westbound journeys toward Vancouver, while eastbound trains call at Katz station across the river. In 1999, CN and CP implemented a directional running agreement along the Thompson River and the Fraser River between Coho (west of Ashcroft) and Matsqui Junction (near Mission), whereby all westbound trains travel on the CN track and eastbound ones use the CP track.

During the 2021 Pacific Northwest floods, an evacuation train went to Hope to transport more than 150 stranded travellers to Vancouver, making three stops in between.

VIA Train Timetables (Regular stop or Flag stop)
	Mile		1976	1980	1981	1989	1990	2000	2010	2021
Matsqui	2870		Flag	Reg.			Reg.	Reg.		
Abbotsford	2870								Flag	Flag
Chilliwack	2854		Reg.	Reg.			Reg.	Reg.	Flag	Flag
Hope	2823	2683	Flag	Flag			Flag	Flag	Flag	Flag
Yale		2786			Flag	Flag				
Boston Bar	2783		Reg.	Reg.			Reg.	Reg.	Flag	Flag
North Bend		2758			Reg.	Reg.				

== See also ==
- List of Via Rail stations
