= Vancouver, Victoria and Eastern Railway =

Defunct Canadian railway line

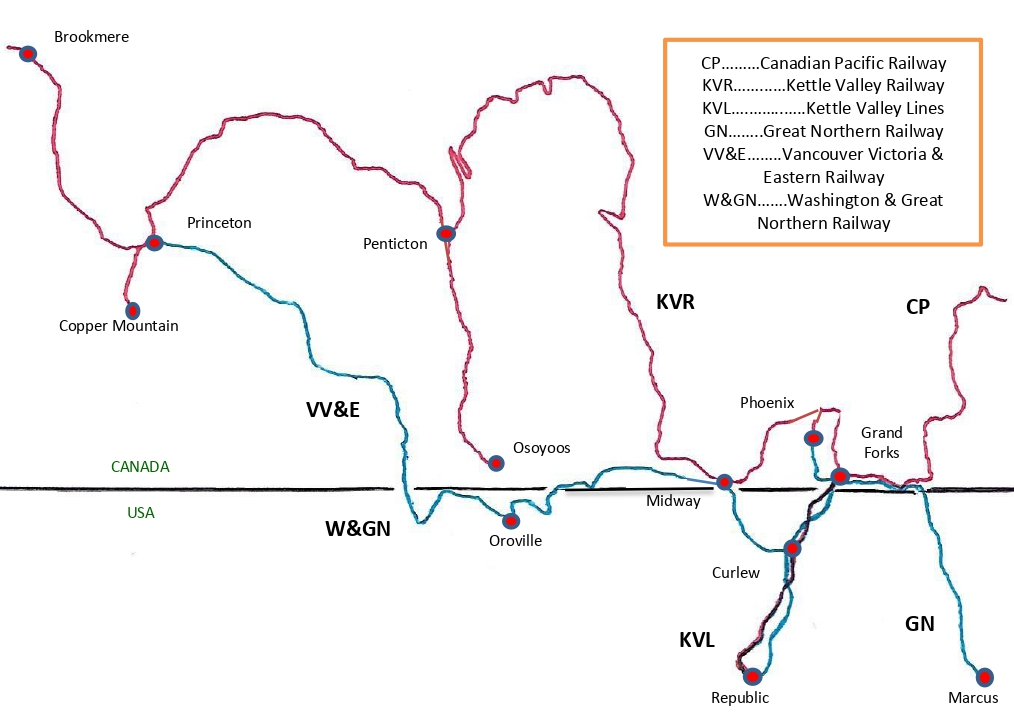
Tulameen, Similkameen, Okanagan, and Kootenay regions, and adjacent Washington. Great Northern Railway (with VV&E and W&GN subsidiaries) (blue). Canadian Pacific Railway (with KVR subsidiary) (purple). Kettle Valley Lines (dark purple).

The Vancouver, Victoria and Eastern Railway (VV&E) was a railway line proposed to connect Metro Vancouver with the Kootenays, in Canada. After acquisition by the Great Northern Railway (GN), most of the route was built, but a passenger through service, using the arranged running rights on the tracks of other companies, never transpired.

== Capturing the Kootenay traffic ==
The north–south mountain ranges of southeastern British Columbia directed the flow of traffic in those directions. In the late 1880s, steamboats connected with the transcontinental railways of either the Canadian Pacific Railway (CP), or to the south, the Northern Pacific Railway (NP), or the GN. In 1891, CP opened the isolated Columbia and Kootenay Railway (C&K) along an unnavigable stretch of the Kootenay River, solely to link boat routes.

However, steamboats were seasonal because of ice in winter and low water in summer. In 1893, independent railroader Daniel Corbin was first to address this problem by opening his Spokane Falls and Northern Railway (SF&N) and Nelson and Fort Sheppard Railway (N&FS) link across the border into the Kootenays. Not surprisingly, Spokane, Washington became the principal city serving the Kootenay region. Vancouver's dislike of the US encroachment equaled its contempt for CP's local monopoly, and its cartage of Kootenay traffic eastward. Denied the benefits of this BC mineral wealth, Vancouver promoted the idea of an independent Coast-to-Kootenay railway.

In 1898, Daniel Corbin's Kettle River Valley Railway, a paper railroad, sought such a federal charter. Suspicion by Vancouver and opposition by CP defeated the request. Meanwhile, CP's isolated Columbia and Western Railway (C&W) extended westward from West Robson via Grand Forks, reaching Midway by the end of 1899.

== Proposal ==
In 1897, William Templeton, William L. Nichol, George Lawson Milne, John T. Bethune, and Alexander Ewan secured a provincial charter for a VV&E route through the Hope mountains and Boundary mining district to the Kootenays. The construction grant would be $4,000 per mile, but contingent upon also receiving a federal charter. At this time, William Mackenzie and Donald Mann, of later Canadian Northern Railway (CNoR) fame, were establishing their conglomerate by building the Lake Manitoba Railway and Canal Company. The pair purchased the VV&E charter for $75,000.

However, Mackenzie and Mann, lacking favour with the federal party in power, made no progress, and resold a controlling interest in the charter to GN's James J. Hill in 1901, and the balance in 1903. GN had a foothold in the Kootenays, having acquired the S&FN and N&FS in 1899. This incursion escalated tensions with CP for control of the Boundary and Similkameen districts. GN had already reached New Westminster by acquiring the New Westminster Southern Railway Company (NWSR) charter, and within the decade would reach Downtown Vancouver by buying the Vancouver, Westminster, and Yukon Railway charter.

Marcus Daly was a business associate of J.J. Hill. No doubt Daly's involvement in the Nickel Plate Mine at Hedley influenced Hill to build westward and up the Similkameen River.

In 1901, Edgar Dewdney surveyed the Cascade Mountains east of Hope, but his report to the BC government expressed no enthusiasm for any of the three prospective railway routes.

== Northern Washington state, Kootenays, Okanagan, and Similkameen ==
=== Construction and operation ===
Under the VV&E charter for BC and the Washington and Great Northern Railway (W&GN) charter for Washington state, GN laid track northward from Marcus (WA), reaching the site of the Laurier–Cascade Border Crossing in March 1902. GN being the greater threat, CP allied with former foe the Kettle Valley Lines (KVL). The latter did all within its power to impede GN progress. Although incomplete, the KVL Grand Forks–Curlew (WA)–Republic (WA) route opened in April. The GN Marcus–south Grand Forks–Curlew–Republic service opened in July. The GN spur, which forked to Columbia and the Granby Smelter, opened in November.

CP legal manoeuvres blocked the GN westward advance for nearly three years. The Grand Forks–Phoenix spur opened in March 1905. Curlew (WA)–Midway (BC) followed a gentle gradient, reaching Midway in November, with passenger service commencing the next month. At Midway and Grand Forks, the VV&E briefly came close to the CP's C&W.

In April 1906, about 5.1 kilometres (3.2 mi) west of Midway, an explosives accident killed six, and seriously injured a further six workers. A 274-metre (900 ft) tunnel was excavated 10.0 kilometres (6.2 mi) west of Midway. In October, the rail head reached Bridesville, then Molson across the border, with passenger service commencing the next month. Farther west in April 1907, a runaway construction train struck a parked locomotive at Oroville, killing one and injuring four. A 137-metre (448 ft) tunnel was excavated 2.1 kilometres (1.3 mi) east of Oroville and a 537-metre (1,761 ft) one 8 kilometres (5 mi) west of Oroville. In April, the rail head crossed back into BC at Chopaka, having crossed the border five times, and reached Keremeos in July.

The recession following the Panic of 1907 slowed the northwestward progress beyond Keremeos. The rail head reached Hedley in August 1909 and Princeton in November, with passenger service commencing the next month.

=== Demise ===
In 1919, services to Phoenix ceased and the track removed back to the junction. In 1913, Wenatchee–Oroville opened, diverting most traffic to this route. After World War I, plunging mineral production and meagre logging impacted the viability of both the VV&E and Kettle Valley Railway (KVR) lines in the Boundary region. Various discussions to consolidate the lines between Grand Forks and Princeton floundered. In 1927, Andrew McCulloch of the KVR concluded that the shorter distances and better grades favoured the VV&E route for through traffic, but key communities on the KVR route could not be abandoned, so any amalgamation would result in even more mileage of unproductive railway.

Molson–Oroville closed in 1931, and the track was lifted the following year. Immediately east, Bridesville traffic largely travelled about 15 kilometres (9 mi) by road to the KVR in Rock Creek. At the VV&E station, freight traffic fell from 54,222 tons in 1929 to 3,562 tons in 1934 and passenger ticket sales from 1,517 in 1929 to 40 in 1933. Curlew–Molson closed in 1935, with track lifted the next year. When floods washed out the Similkameen River bridge at the east end of the Princeton yards in April 1934, GN ended all service north of this point, and regular service north of Hedley. This track was abandoned and lifted in 1937 and later became the base for BC Highway 3.

In 1940, the Kettle Falls rail bridge was built on the track diversion that replaced the Marcus bridge, when Marcus was flooded by the reservoir for the Grand Coulee Dam. Hedley–Kermeos was abandoned in 1954 and the tracks lifted the following year. In 1972, spring runoff washed out a span of the Armstrong bridge near Nighthawk, closing the track north of the border. Republic–San Poil was abandoned in 1983. In 2004, OmniTRAX subsidiary Kettle Falls International Railway (KFR) purchased the track east of San Poil, abandoning San Poil–Danville in 2006.

=== Rail trails ===
Rail trails comprise the Similkameen Trail west of Oroville and the Ferry County Rail Trail from Danville almost to Republic.

== Coquihalla and Tulameen ==
=== Construction and operation ===
In early 1910, work commenced on two tunnels. The 324-metre (1,062 ft) one beneath Bromley Ridge was immediately west of Princeton. The 12.1-kilometre (7.5 mi) Cascade one, linking the upper Tulameen and the Coquihalla valleys, shortened the proposed route by about 48 kilometres (30 mi) and eliminated much difficult gradient. GN abandoned the Cascade project (a.k.a. Railroad Pass Route) that November but laid track through the Bromley Ridge in mid-1911, reaching Coalmont in November, with regular freight service beginning in May 1912.

Unfortunately, at this time, the politicians failed to rein in the two railway barons for the common long-term good. Common sense should have rejected using the slide-prone, snowy Coquihalla Pass, but a compromise to complete the Railroad Pass tunnel as a shared trackage never came to pass. Furthermore, the Tulameen and Coquihalla valleys could accommodate only a single good rail alignment. In April 1913, CP and GN agreed to share the trackage to be laid between Hope and Princeton. KVR would build eastward from Hope and VV&E westward from Princeton. In October 1914, Louis Hill drove the last spike five days after the two railways connected at Brookmere. The GN $150,000 annual contribution to the Coquihalla trackage did make the route marginally economic for CP in the early decades.

=== Demise ===
After KVR passenger service began in May 1915, GN handed over general freight and passenger services north of Princeton to the KVR.

GN never ran a commercial train across the KVR section but remained obliged to make the $150,000 donation, offset by the $60,000 a year payable by CP for using the Brookmere–Princeton section. During 1917 and 1918, a service did exist for the adventurous to use the KVR for Hope–Princeton, connecting with local GN trains at each end.

In the wintertime, GN ran trains as far north as Otter Lake, where crews cut blocks of ice to provide refrigeration for fruit packing and transportation. The downhill grade to Wenatchee allowed a single locomotive to comfortably haul 50–70 loaded boxcars. Weather affected the harvest, which ranged from 350 carloads in 1921 to 2,300 in 1922. The ice was stored at the major fruit-packing centres of Washington state. The wide adoption of mechanical refrigeration ended the practice in 1925. Although some suggest GN continued to run coal trains south from Coalmont, the more likely scenario was that CP hauled the GN coal cars to Princeton, where they joined the GN triweekly mixed train south.

In 1921, the KVR assumed management of the Princeton station.

GN paid CP $4.5 million in 1944 to cancel the running rights west of Brookmere, offset by the sale of the GN stretch to Princeton for $1.5 million. By that time, a decade had passed since GN had a working line to even access its own Brookmere–Princeton trackage. CP concrete lined the Bromley Ridge tunnel in 1961.

CP ran the final freight train along the Princeton–Brookmere track in 1989, and all the track was lifted by the end of summer 1991.

=== Rail trail ===
Princeton–Brookmere forms part of the Kettle Valley Rail Trail. North of Coalmont includes vehicular access.

== Fraser Valley ==
=== Construction and operation ===
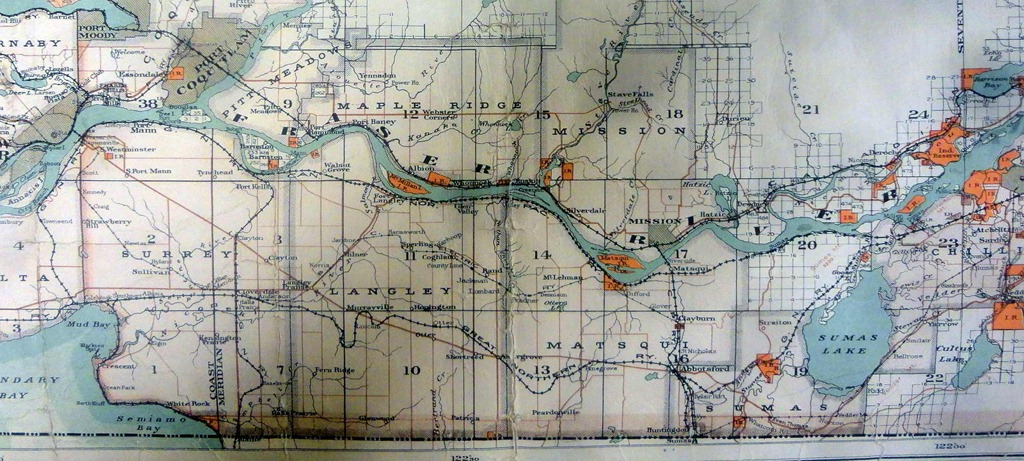
Fraser Valley, BC map, 1914. Under construction are the GN along the northwest shore of Sumas Lake and the CNoR along the south shore of the Fraser River

In 1903, the Victoria Terminal Railway and Ferry Company (VTRF), a VV&E subsidiary, opened the Cloverdale–Port Guichon railway link.

In 1908, the VV&E Cloverdale–Sumas–Huntingdon Border Crossing opened, connecting with the GN's NP. In 1909, 22 section hands were killed and 15 injured when a work train derailed.

In 1912, Abbotsford–Kilgard opened.

In September 1916, the track reached Cannor (west of Chilliwack), the junction with the CNoR. GN paid CNoR $50,000 a year for running rights on the Cannor–Hope track. Service to the Hope terminus may have commenced soon after, but was definitely available during 1917 and 1918.

=== Demise ===
In 1910, the British Columbia Electric Railway (BCER) completed a Vancouver–Chilliwack line. Running up to four round trips daily, handling both freight and passengers, the service overshadowed the GN triweekly mixed-train option through the valley. By February 1919, GN regular service had retreated to a Kilgard terminus. The formal abandonment took place in two stages, west of bridge 176 in 1920 and east in 1924.

In 1929, prior to abandoning, the Kilgard branch was connected to the nearby BCER line to service the clay pipe factory and a lumber company. That year, regular service retreated to Abbotsford and then to the initial starting point of Cloverdale. The formal abandonment took place in two stages, west of Abbotsford in 1933 and east in 1942. The NP maintained a link to the latter via the Sumas border crossing, prolonging its intermittent use.

== Entire route ==
In September 1916, a train carrying a VV&E official party ran from Vancouver along GN trackage to Cannor via the CNoR to Hope, the KVR to Brookmere, and the GN to Spokane.

In 1937, John Sullivan, a retired senior CP engineer, wrote to his counterpart McCulloch, stating, "Of all the blunders in railway building history, the CPR's southern British Columbia rail line is the greatest".

CP and GN both strived to complete two new, but unnecessary, transcontinental lines. The animosity and rivalry between William van Horne and J.J. Hill was a factor, but so too was the railway building frenzy of the era, when the GTP, CnoR, and PGE were each naïve in their BC endeavours. If the westward advance halted, perhaps GN might have lost its charter and access to BC mineral deposits. Reduced shipping rates from competition did not help the railways but did improve the viability of many Boundary mines.

Building west from Midway over some of the most rugged BC terrain was questionable for CP and GN. Not surprisingly, apart from a small heritage railway, none of the KVR track remains. A Vancouver–Spokane service over the built VV&E route was 795 kilometres (494 mi), compared with 528 kilometres (328 mi) over the GN route via Everett, which offered flatter terrain and straighter track. Of the original GN track, only east from Grand Forks exists. Despite J.J. Hill's public proclamations, how serious GN was in building a through route is uncertain.

GN was consolidated into the Burlington Northern Railroad (BN) in 1970, which in turn merged to become the Burlington Northern and Santa Fe Railway (BNSF) in 1995.

== See also ==
- Victoria and Sidney Railway
- Victoria Terminal Railway and Ferry Company
- Vancouver, Westminster and Yukon Railway
