= Danville–Carson Border Crossing =

Border crossing between Canada and the United States

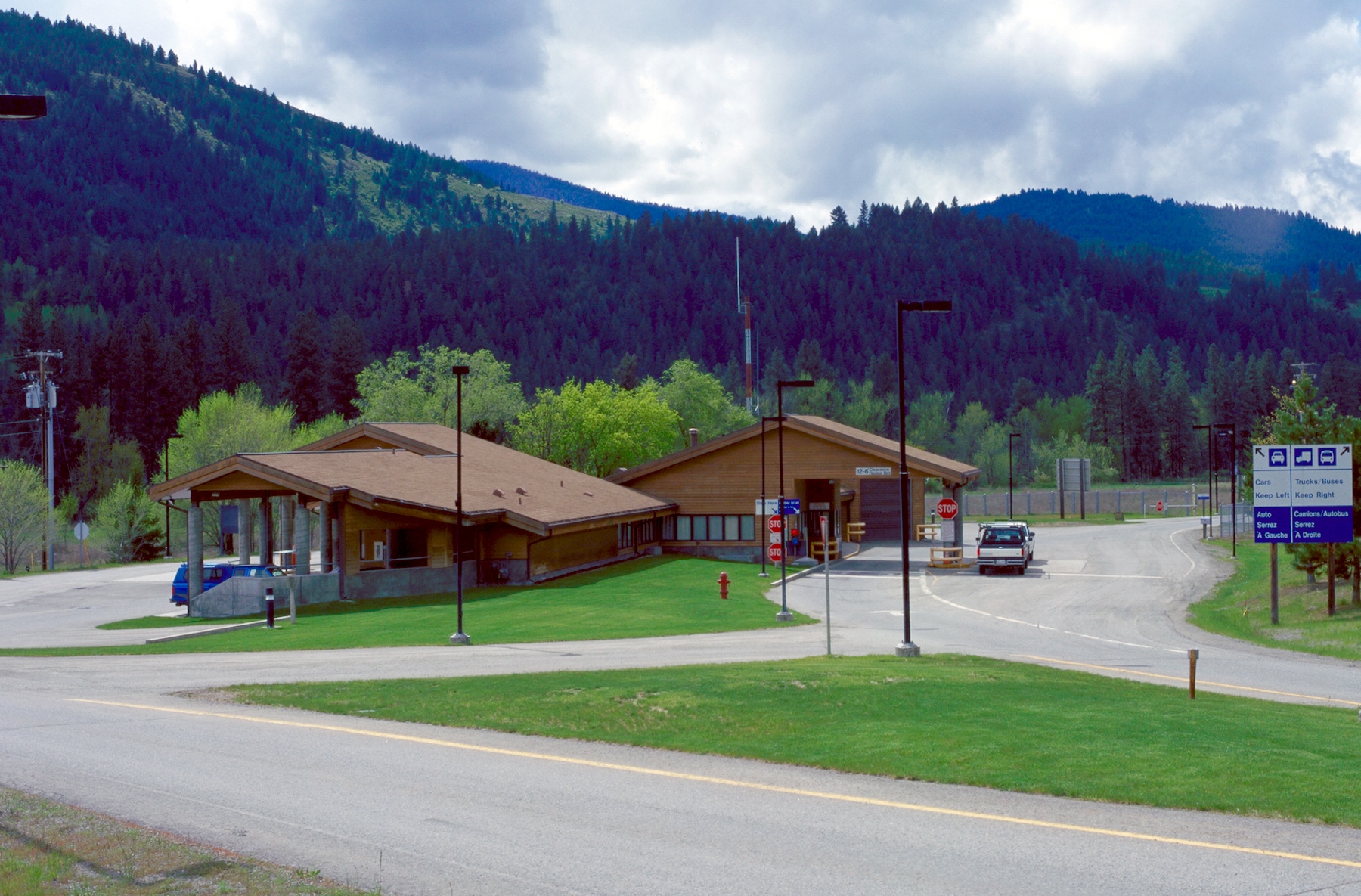
- US-Canada Joint Border Inspection Station at the Danville-Carson Border Crossing

Locaiton
- Country: United States; Canada
- Location: SR 21 / Highway 41; US Port: 3184 Hwy 21W, Danville, WA 99121; Canadian Port: 4900 Highway 41, Grand Forks, BC V0H 1H5
- Coordinates: 49°00′00″N 118°30′13″W

Details
- Opened: 1897

Website
- Oroville

The Danville–Carson Border Crossing connects the town of Danville, Washington with Grand Forks, British Columbia on the Canada–US border. Washington State Route 21 on the American side joins British Columbia Highway 41 on the Canadian side.

== Danville ==
On the US side, the town of Danville was formerly named Nelson.

== Carson ==
On the Canadian side is Carson, a locality of Grand Forks. Dan McLaren, who preempted this property, built a cabin, stable and blacksmith shop, which provided accommodation for visitors passing through from Marcus, Washington. The post office operated 1892–1915. By 1895, brothers Dan and John McLaren had built the Grande Prairie Hotel and the IOOF hall. That year, they laid out the Carson City townsite, named for Isabella Carson McLaren, their mother.

In 1908, the hotel burned down. Unable to compete with Grand Forks as the commercial hub, and diminished by the fires of 1919 and 1929, Carson gradually transformed into a mainly residential area.

== Carson road bridge ==
By 1897, a wagon bridge existed over the Kettle River. In 1902, high waters washed out the bridge, which was not replaced for years. In 1904, the erection of a footbridge saved a walk to Danville and a return along the Kettle Valley Lines (KVL) track. In 1906, a new road bridge opened. In 1917, the bridge was redecked. In 1922, a 150-foot (46 m) howe truss structure was installed. Closed in 1975, the bridge was demolished the next year. The bridge was never rebuilt.

== Rail service ==
In 1902, the Great Northern Railway (GN) and the KVL opened Grand Forks–Curlew–Republic routes. The KVL track crossed the river near Danville. The GN Danville station was 4.1 miles (6.6 km) northeast of Hurlburt and 1.5 miles (2.4 km) southwest of Grand Forks Junction. In 1903, KVL completed a freight depot at Danville.

In 1919, the S&BC (the US portion of the KVL) was in liquidation, defunct, and being dismantled. In 1947, GN passenger train service ceased, the former route becoming freight only. In 2004, OmniTRAX subsidiary, Kettle Falls International Railway (KFR) purchased the track westward to San Poil, but abandoned San Poil–Danville in 2006.

The Ferry County Rail Trail stretches from Danville almost to Republic along the former GN rail bed.

== Rail accidents near Danville ==
List of rail accidents near Danville
- 1905: A GN construction train pushing a caboose struck a handcar 2 miles (3 km) south. The toppling caboose fatally crushed the conductor.
- 1906: The passenger car on a mixed train derailed at a switch 4 miles (6 km) south, badly damaging the car.
- 1908: Immediately north, seven KVL cars derailed.
- 1912: An eastbound GN passenger train fatally struck a prospector crossing over the track in the vicinity.
- 1913: Three GN bridge carpenters, who were riding a sand car leaving northward down the grade, derailed and were struck by a following sand car, causing broken and fractured bones.
- 1914: A speeder approaching southward struck an oncoming handcar. The occupants on the latter jumped in time, but the three people riding the former sustained cuts and bruises on being ejected.
- 1919: While attempting to board a moving GN train at the station, a passenger slipped, and the car wheels amputated both legs above the knee. The man died of his injuries a month later.
- 1930: A southbound GN passenger train hit a truck on a nearby railway crossing, killing the driver.

== Road passengers ==
By 1896, a Carson–Nelson–Eureka camps (Republic) stage operated.

In 1927, a daily auto stage was inaugurated from Republic that crossed at this border location. (image)

Operating at least during the late 1980s, the Eagle Stage line followed a similar route.

== Border crossing ==
The communities functioned as one with residents flowing freely across the border. The McLaren brothers agreed to sell 1 acre (0.4 ha) in the Carson townsite to O.B. Nelson, who operated a store on the US side, on the condition of opening a Carson store. However, an October 1897 court case revealed that the store, which straddled the Canada–US border, rested on Canadian land not owned by the McLarens. Either ownership rights and/or government concerns regarding the collection of duties upon merchandise sales soon prompted the store closure at that location. Earlier that year, a prankster who held up the mail carrier between the two communities was later arrested. A year later, the mail was being routed via Marcus.

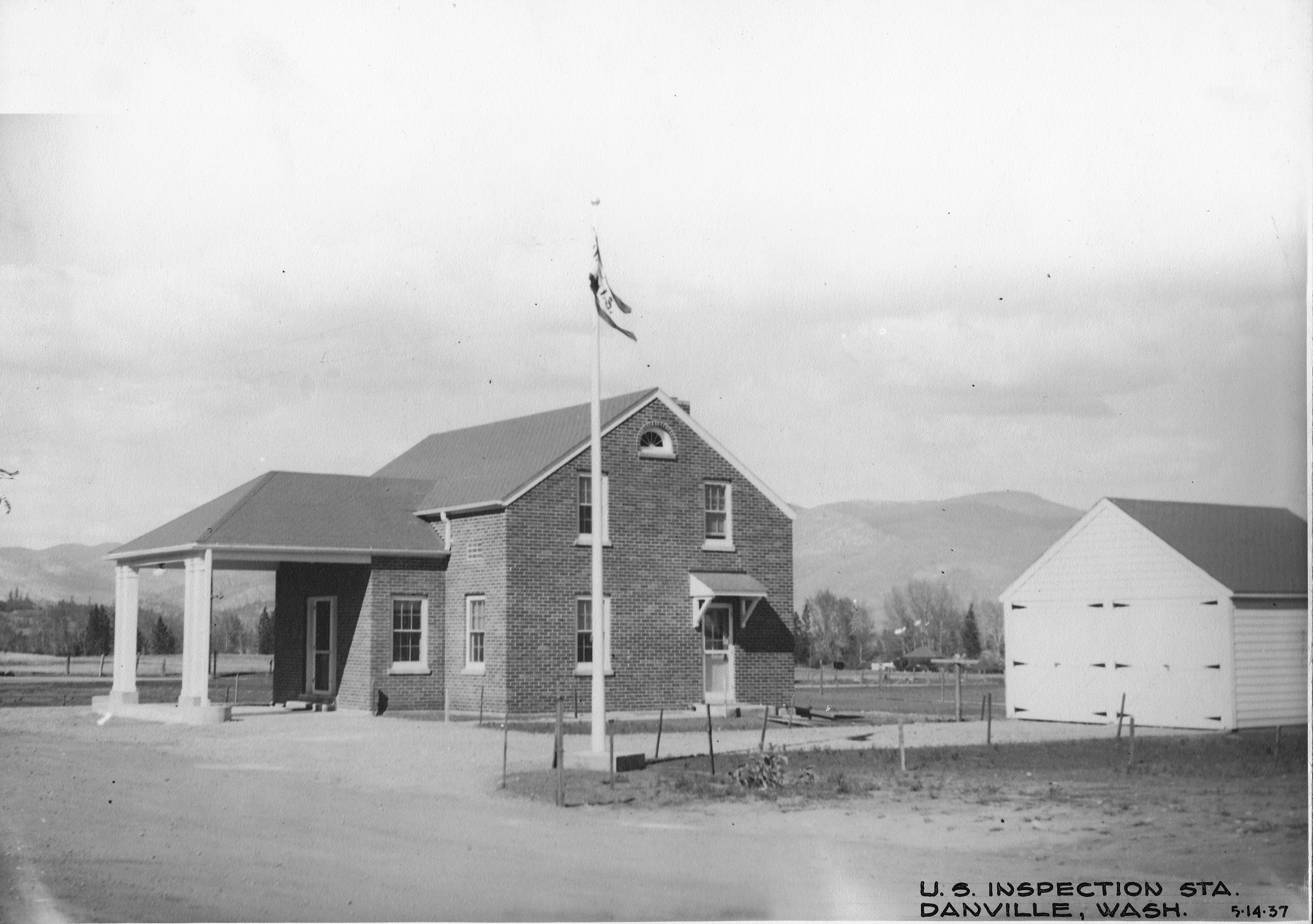
US Border Inspection Station, Danville, 1937

In November 1897, the Reservation Record, the local newspaper, was appointed special US customs inspector at Nelson (Danville). The primary role was to collect duties on lumber exports from BC, pending a decision whether to make a permanent appointment. Weeks later, L.K. Boissonault was appointed US customs inspector at this location. In August 1900, the customs house, then situated in the town, was one of the buildings damaged by a fire.

In 1902, A.E. McAuley became the inaugural Canadian customs officer at Carson, primarily focusing on the new rail traffic. That year, Frank Sherwood, a newspaperman, was also appointed as a US customs inspector.

By 1914, the Grand Forks–Danville road was macadamised. A 1929 grass fire destroyed, the former Carson customs office and other pioneer buildings on the east shore of the river. In 1948, Highway 41 was paved.

In 1988, the first joint US-Canada border inspection facilities (present structures) opened along the highway on the west shore, replacing the US brick inspection station from the 1930s and the Canadian one from 1950 at that location.

The Canadian border hours are daily from 8:00am to 8:00pm (travellers) and from 8:30am to 4:30pm (commercial). In 2018, the US reduced the previous border hours of 8:00am to midnight. The current US hours are daily from 8:00am to 8:00pm.

== See also ==
- List of Canada–United States border crossings
