= Ansorge Hotel =

- U.S. National Register of Historic Places
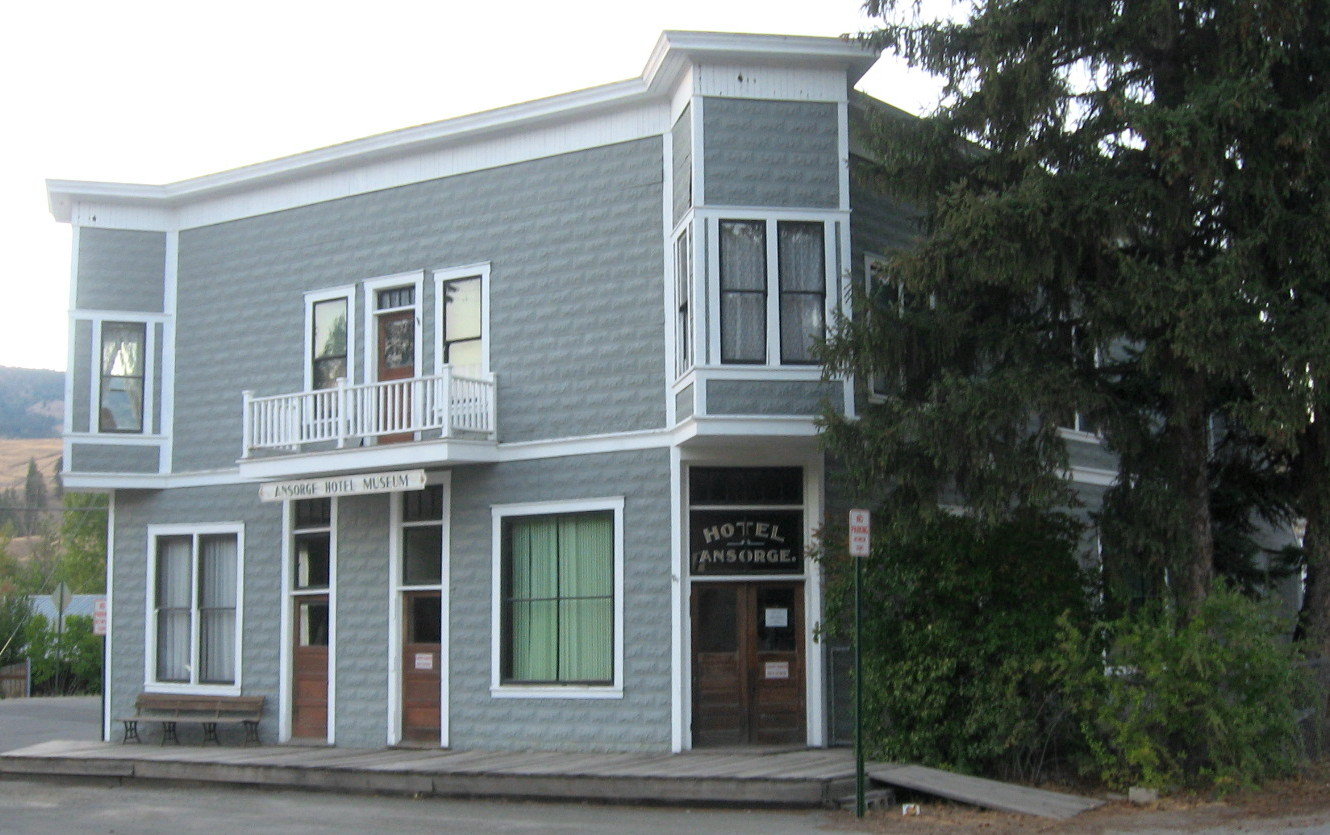
- The Ansorge Hotel, September 2007

- Location within Washington (state) Location within the United States
- Interactive map showing the location of Ansorge Hotel
- Location: River St. and Railroad Ave., Curlew, Washington
- Nearest city: Republic, Washington
- Coordinates: 48°53′1.7″N 118°35′59.3″W
- Area: less than one acre
- Built: 1907 (incorrectly 1903)
- Architect: William Ansorge
- NRHP reference No.: 79002530
- Added to NRHP: March 26, 1979

The Ansorge Hotel is a turn of the 20th century two-story building in Curlew, Washington. It was built in 1907 next to the Great Northern Railway and Republic and Kettle Valley Railway lines. Several patrons of historical note are thought to have stayed at the hotel, including Henry Ford. The hotel went through several owners before it shut down in the 1970s. Soon after that, a historical conservation review led to its current National Register of Historic Places status. Restoration efforts in the 1980s, followed by operation as a museum and historic landmark, were undertaken by the Kettle River History club.

== Railroad "boom town" ==
With the incorporation of the Republic and Kettle Valley Railway, a private railway based in Republic, Washington, Curlew was identified as a major stopping point on the proposed line between the gold mines in Republic and connection to the transcontinental railways at Grand Forks, British Columbia. Both the Republic and Kettle Valley Railway and the competing Washington & Great Northern Railway, subsidiary of the Great Northern Railway, arrived in Curlew in 1902; their lines ran nearly parallel from Malo through Curlew to Grand Forks.

The prediction of a "railroad boom" to benefit Curlew and its immediate vicinity prompted William Ansorge, who arrived the same year, to start looking at construction of a hotel near the railroad depot's proposed location. It is debated whether Ansorge built first and bought the city lots later, or bought the lots and then built. Local oral history states the first hotel was built and opened in 1903, however records of the county assessor show the city lots being purchased in 1904. Ansorge's first building is described as a simple frame construction, and with the completion of the current building in 1907, it was moved to the back of the hotel property and named the "Ansorge Annex" where it housed a series of different businesses.

The new larger building comprised a two story wood frame building with a rectangular footprint. Three sides of the roofline are mounted by an overhanging cornice which surrounds the roof parapet, itself enclosing the shed roof of the hotel. The siding of the new building was clad in tin sheet metal stamped to resemble rustic stone blocks. The original color of the tin was a dark gray, but the building was soon painted pale gray with white entablature between the first and second stories plus white trim. The unpainted tin is only present on the inside side of the parapet.

Both rail lines were late to the area however, and the height of the Republic gold boom was already over with the evaporation of a gold boom, Curlew never grew above around 300 people and its "whistle stop" days on the Great Northern Railway faded. In 1909, Ansorge was granted a state liquor license and converted the "Ansorge Annex" from its prior functions into a saloon for the hotel and town. The regular dinner service provided in the dining room was ended by 1922 due to diminishing patronage, and the saloon annex was eventually torn down to be replaced with a laundromat.

== Ownership and management ==
The first change of management started in 1911 with William Ansorge being investigated and subsequently convicted for violating Washington state liquor law. When he was arrested on May 5, the charge of "selling liquor to an Indian" was given as a reason. Upon initial conviction by Judge Pendergast in the town of Republic, Ansorge was released on bail pending appeal to the state's supreme court. After the ruling, Ansorge turned over running of the hotel to his wife and her family the Keihls; they promptly leased the hotel and its operations to Augusta and George Thomas, who took over on June 1 of the same year. for a period of three years. William Ansorge never returned to running the hotel; he gave up appealing his conviction, and in December 1911 he began serving his sentence in the Walla Walla State Penitentiary.

When the lease to the Thomases expired in 1914, the Keihls managed it themselves for several years before again turning management over to others. In 1917 Leo Strassburg and his wife took over as managers, and stayed until the late 1940s. Responsibility once again reverted to the Keihls, and members of the family sporadically operated and lived in the building through the 1950s. In 1964 the hotel was sold to Louella Burns and Mr. and Mrs. Richard Lembeke, all of Curlew; they kept it open until 1977. After it was listed on the National Register of Historic Places in 1979, ownership of the hotel was transferred in the 1980s to the Kettle River Historical Club.

== Famous patrons ==
On July 31, 1917, the hotel possibly hosted one of its most prominent guests, with the register for that day having the signature of a "Henry Ford, Detroit Mich.", who was said to be in the region visiting relatives. Local history maintains this was industrialist Henry Ford and as such a photograph of the signature, which is slightly different from Ford's typical style, was sent to the Ford Motor Company in the 1970s for verification. A definite answer was not able to be given by Henry Ford Museum of American Innovation confirming the signature, however he was traveling in the west during the timeframe in question and did have relatives in the Okanogan Highlands region. Additional local lore suggests the patronage at some time early in the Ansorge Hotels history by James J. Hill, director of the Great Northern.

== Notable happenings ==
Possibly in 1912 under the Thomases' management or just before their tenure, the first long distance telephone in the region was installed in the hotel lobby – it was the only long distance telephone line in the region until the 1950s. Just over a month after Augusta Thomas took proprietorship, the hotel was slightly affected by a fire on the night of July 11, 1911. A. J. Maxwell's butchery and meat market across the street from the Ansorge burned because of a faulty flue. The heat of the fire reached the hotel, but its metal siding prevented significant damage or flames spreading. The window casings and siding of the hotel on the side that faced the fire were badly scorched, and all the windows on that side were broken by the intense heat.

During the years of prohibition, the hotel played a role in the region's rum-running. Barrels of Canadian liquor were placed into the Kettle River upstream of town and allowed to float downstream across the Canada–United States border until they reached Curlew. On occasions when revenue agents were staying in the Ansorge, a red light was placed in an upstairs bay window to signal the American rum-runners that they should not retrieve the liquor in town.

As a result of the 1918 Senate election, a series of hearings was conducted in the 69th United States Congress by the United States Senate Select Committee on Senatorial Elections to investigate allegations of improper funding of election campaigns. During the hearing convened in Seattle on October 23, 1926, and presided over by Senator Charles L. McNary, testimony was taken from Sam R. Sumner regarding impropriety by Democratic Senate candidate A. Scott Bullitt. Sumner, of the Washington state Republican Committee, included a placard as exhibit 13 for his testimony; it was intended for the Ansorge Hotel where it would likely have been displayed in a window to indicate the Ansorge Hotel's support for Bullitt's position on repealing the Federal Sunday closing law, showing a copy of a Seattle Star article.

== Historic registration and restoration ==
In January 1979 the Ansorge Hotel was one of six buildings or sites in Eastern Washington that had been submitted for consideration to the National Register of Historic Places. Official acceptance came the week of April 4, 1979, for both the Ansorge and another Ferry County site, the Nelson-Grunwell store in Danville, both submitted by the Washington State Advisory Council on Historic Preservation. Addition to the NRHP opened access to restoration funding and protected the building from alterations considered to be arbitrary.

In the 1980s, the Ansorge Hotel became the target of the Kettle River History club for restoration and operation as a museum, a goal the group accomplished in part in time for the 1989 Washington State Centennial. After 20 years of restoration efforts, the hotel celebrated its centennial on May 17, 2003, with tours and refreshments offered by the KRHC plus Ford Model Ts parked in front of the hotel as part of the celebration. The centennial was timed in conjunction with the opening of the Malo Car & Truck Museum and the activities of both the Kettle Valley Songbird Festival and the Curlew Arts Summit.

== Amenities and layout ==
The front of the building faces the former location of the Great Northern rail depot, as the hotel was dependent on rail traffic for most of its business. Because of its proximity to the former railroad lines, none of the walls inside the building meet at 90° angles; it was thought that narrower angles were more resistant to the vibration of passing trains. The second floor's single toilet and bath are in a standalone room in the center of the second floor; a "day room" or parlor for conducting business, a closet, and eight guest rooms of irregular shape are arranged around the exterior walls. The parlor is the only room on that floor with access to the balcony, which overlooks the front of the hotel. The front corner rooms, which have square oriel bay windows, include internal doors that can be used to close off the bay area, and one of the corner rooms was designated the "honeymoon suit".

The Ansorge was one of the few buildings in the region to have running indoor water and two flush toilets when it opened. Considered a "marvel of civilization" at the time, the water for the hotel was supplied from a roof based cistern, with gravity power providing water pressure. When needed, additional water could be hand pumped from ground level water supplies. Guests of the Ansorge could draw a bath in the building's only bathtub for the price of $0.50 (equivalent to about $17.28 in 2025) Rooms on the second floor are still equipped with rope ladders at the windows, and chamber pots for use when the one toilet was in use, and some of the dressers have been stocked with vintage clothing.

The first floor was also used for varied purposes. The kitchen, in the northwest corner, has been upgraded to appliances of the 1960s and 1970s, while the dining room in the southwest was eventually converted into a living room with little modification. The lobby in the southeast also served as a barber shop area, and many of the fixtures for both purposes are still in place; it now serves as the museum's gift shop. A glass cigar case and display counter area which are first seen in a 1930s-era photograph are still present in the lobby section. One of the original fixtures in the lobby, a nickel operated (nickelodeon), wax cylinder hexaphone phonograph is still in working condition and present. The northeastern corner room was originally a bar that converted to soda fountain and pool room during prohibition, it houses the heating plant for the building, and for a time was used for storage. The room was renovated into a restoration of the Helphrey Brothers Curlew Store, for which the original store's furnishings, counter, and cash register were used. A small toilet cubicle is located in the center of the ground floor, under the second floor restroom, and is accessible from both the lobby and the bar rooms.

A partially finished basement area with walls constructed of local stone is accessed via a trap door on one side of the building. The original annex building turned saloon was torn down and replaced with a more modern building of shed roof design, and most recently housed the Curlew Laundromat. The ground floor door from the hotel into the laundromat building was inoperable as of the 1970s, while the second floor access way led to the attic space above the laundromat.

== Modern day ==
Much of the building is unchanged; only the installation of electricity, and updates to that, to the heating plant, and to the kitchen appliances are identifiable in pictures from the early years. The structure has been mostly restored and contains many of the original fixtures and furniture in many of the rooms. As late as 2003 the museum was opened regularly on summer weekends, but as of 2024 tours had been changed to by appointment only. The Ansorge is the last remaining old hotel in Ferry County.
