= Spokane Falls and Northern Railway =

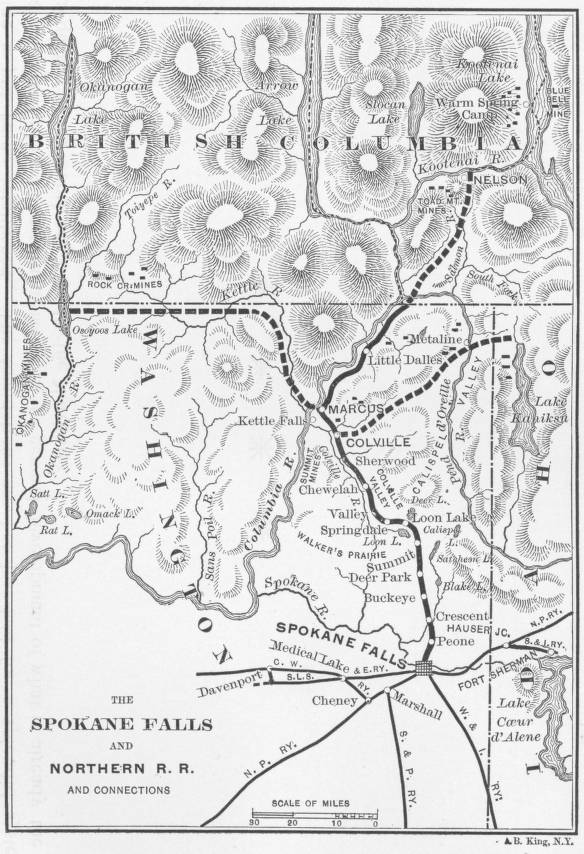
- Railroad map and connections in 1890

Overview
- Locale: Washington
- Dates of operation: 1889–
- Successors: Northern Pacific Railway

Technical
- Track gauge: 1,435 mm (4 ft 8 1/2 in)

The Spokane Falls & Northern (SF&N) is a historic railroad that operated in northeast Washington state. The SF&N initially connected the city of Spokane (then called Spokane Falls) with the Canada–United States border at Waneta, British Columbia.

== Initial proposal & planning ==
Daniel Chase Corbin had significant funds, and access to investors, gained through his experience in the building, operation, and sale of small railroads. Consequently, Spokane businessmen seeking a railroad north from Spokane to Colville, but unable to finance the project, approached him. In February 1889, Corbin became general manager, senior officers were largely the New York financiers, and Edward J. Roberts was appointed as chief construction engineer.

To have the line run through their town, Colville residents agreed to secure the right-of-way in the immediate vicinity and donate 40 acres in town for a railroad yard. In March, Cyrus Burns and John Chapman were awarded the grading contract for the whole route. Before leaving for New York to buy steel rails, four locomotives, and passenger and freight cars, Corbin instructed Roberts to build as fast and cheaply as possible. Not only were unlimited curves allowed to fit the topography, but also to avoid the costs of blasting and filling, large tree stumps were to be left in the ground.

== Initial construction ==
The route largely followed the winding old Colville trail and wagon road. Building around stumps greater than three feet in diameter, and other economy measures, gave a construction cost of about $8,604 a mile. At the time, railroads considered $10,000 a mile extremely cheap. By May 1889, 55 miles had been surveyed and 40 miles graded. With little mechanization, mostly the brawn of humans and horses performed the work.

On May 23, two new olive-green locomotives, and 26 new freight cars, arrived. The former were wood-burning Baldwin 2-6-0s, but the name of the road was misspelled "Spokehane." With Corbin driving the first spike, track laying began on May 30. By August 4, 40 miles had been laid to the north end of Loon Lake. Four new Troy passenger cars were delivered to Spokane. A brick depot was rising on the north bank of the river for joint use by the Seattle, Lake Shore & Eastern Railway, the Oregon Railroad and Navigation Company, and the SF&N. That still Sunday, a fire started in a row of frame buildings. Corbin and Roberts were able to rescue valuable papers from their rented offices, before the building ignited in a blaze that scorched 32 city blocks. Temporary company offices were established in two combination cars near the depot site.

By August 21, grading was completed into Colville and tracklaying spanned 48 miles northward. Work trains carried freight and passengers. From September 2, the stage operated between Colville and the advancing rail head. By October 1, the work was beyond Chewelah. On October 18, 1889, the tracks reached the new frame depot at Colville.

== Penetrating British Columbia ==
The rich mineral and lumber resources of BC were alluring. American prospectors had been pouring north along the Columbia and Kootenay river valleys. Corbin recognized that railroads would be strategic for the transport of Kootenay ores. Colville–Little Dalles was completed in August 1890, where the line connected northward with the Columbia and Kootenay Steam Navigation Company (C&KSN), incorporated in 1890. The C&KSN boats reached to the Canadian Pacific Railway (CP) at Revelstoke, and gave access to the West Kootenay mining area.

However, the steamboats were seasonal because of ice in winter and low water in summer. Consequently, Corbin advanced northward another seven miles, buying 158 acres by the river, which he named Northport. The railhead arrived on December 31, 1892. From here, an 1896 prong would be to Rossland along his Columbia & Red Mountain Railway (C&RM) (WA section), and Red Mountain Railway (RMR) (BC section). The first prong was to Boundary opened on June 26, 1893, connecting with the Nelson and Fort Sheppard Railway (N&FS) to become the first American railroad incursion into the West Kootenays. The Troup Junction landing near Nelson would receive Slocan and Kootenay Lake ores by steamboat for transport south on the N&FS and SF&N to American smelters.

== Operators & extensions ==
On July 1, 1898, the Northern Pacific Railway (NP) acquired the SF&N. On June 30, 1899, the Great Northern Railway (GN) purchased the NP stock.

Under the VV&E charter for BC, and the Washington and Great Northern Railway (W&GN) charter for WA, GN extended northward from Marcus (WA). In 1902, the rail head reached Grand Forks (BC), Curlew (WA) and Republic (WA), making a general westward advance. Subsequent sections opened were a Grand Forks–Phoenix spur in 1905, Curlew (WA)–Midway (BC)–Molson (WA) in 1906, Molson–Oroville (WA)–Keremeos (BC) in 1907, and Keremeos–Hedley–Princeton in 1909. These extensions initially operated as part of the SF&N division.

In 1919, passenger service to Phoenix ceased, and the tracks were removed back to Copper Junction near Grand Forks. Further abandonments were Molson–Oroville in 1931, Curlew–Molson in 1935, Princeton–Hedley in 1937 (unused since a bridge washout in 1934), Hedley–Kermeos in 1954, Kermeos–border in 1985 (unused since Armstrong bridge near Chopaka washout in 1972), Republic–San Poil in 1983, and San Poil–Danville in 2006.

In 1940, the Kettle Falls rail bridge was built on the track diversion that replaced the Marcus bridge, when Marcus was flooded by the reservoir for the Grand Coulee Dam.

The GN was consolidated into the Burlington Northern Railroad (BN) in 1970, which merged to become the Burlington Northern and Santa Fe Railway (BNSF) in 1996. In 2004, OmniTRAX subsidiary, Kettle Falls International Railway (KFR), leased the former S&FN from Kettle Falls northeast to beyond Waneta, and purchased the northwestward extension to San Poil. In 2019, the St. Paul & Pacific Northwest Railroad Company acquired the original S&FN section.

== Train stations ==
Spokane–Waneta
Mile	1905	Mile	1907	Mile	1913	Mile	1916	Mile	1922	Mile	1928	Mile	1933	Mile	1955
0.0	Spokane	0.0	Spokane												
4.7	Hillyard	4.7	Hillyard												
13.8	Colbert	13.8	Colbert	13.8	Dean	13.8	Dean	13.9	Dean	0.0	Dean	0.0	Dean	0.0	Dean
17.6	Wayside	17.6	Wayside	17.7	Wayside	17.6	Wayside	17.7	Wayside	3.8	Wayside	3.8	Wayside	3.8	Wayside
				20.7	Darts	20.7	Darts	20.2	Dart						
22.7	Pratt	22.7	Pratt	22.7	Denison	22.7	Denison	22.8	Denison	8.9	Denison	8.9	Denison	8.9	Denison
26.5	Deer Park	26.5	Deer Park	26.5	Deer Park	26.5	Deer Park	26.5	Deer Park	12.5	Deer Park	12.5	Deer Park	12.5	Deer Park
		30.7	Christianson	30.7	Christianson	30.7	Christianson	30.8	Christianson	16.9	Christianson				
31.6	Clayton	31.6	Clayton	31.6	Clayton	31.6	Clayton	31.7	Clayton	17.8	Clayton	17.8	Clayton	17.8	Clayton
38.4	Loon Lake	38.4	Loon Lake	38.4	Loon Lake	38.4	Loon Lake	38.5	Loon Lake	24.6	Loon Lake	24.6	Loon Lake	24.6	Loon Lake
46.5	Springdale	46.5	Springdale	46.6	Springdale	46.5	Springdale	46.6	Springdale	32.7	Springdale	32.7	Springdale	32.7	Springdale
				47.6	Cline	47.6	Cline	47.8	Cline	33.9	Cline	33.9	Cline	33.9	Cline
52.0	Grays	52.0	Grays	52.0	Grays	52.0	Grays	51.3	Grays	37.4	Grays	37.4	Grays	37.4	Grays
56.5	Valley	56.5	Valley	56.5	Valley	56.5	Valley	56.5	Valley	42.6	Valley	42.6	Valley	42.6	Valley
64.0	Chewelah	64.0	Chewelah	64.0	Chewelah	64.0	Chewelah	64.0	Chewelah	50.2	Chewelah	50.2	Chewelah	50.2	Chewelah
73.2	Addy	73.2	Addy	73.2	Addy	73.2	Addy	73.3	Addy	59.4	Addy	59.4	Addy	59.4	Addy
80.5	Arden	80.5	Arden	80.5	Arden	80.5	Arden	80.7	Arden	66.8	Arden	66.8	Arden	66.8	Arden
				83.6	Kiel	83.6	Kiel	83.4	Orin	69.5	Orin	69.5	Orin		
87.1	Colville	87.1	Colville	87.2	Colville	87.1	Colville	87.2	Colville	73.3	Colville	73.3	Colville	73.3	Colville
								90.3	Palmers	76.3	Palmers	76.3	Palmers	76.3	Palmers
95.7	Meyer's Falls	95.7	Meyer's Falls	95.7	Meyer's Falls	95.7	Meyer's Falls	95.7	Meyer's Falls	81.8	Meyer's Falls	81.8	Meyer's Falls	81.7	Kettle Falls
101.2	Marcus	101.2	Marcus	101.2	Marcus	101.2	Marcus	101.0	Marcus	87.1	Marcus	87.1	Marcus		
														91.6	Evans
109.7	Bossburg	8.5	Bossburg	8.5	Bossburg	8.7	Bossburg	8.7	Bossburg	8.8	Bossburg	8.8	Bossburg	95.5	Bossburg
114.8	Williams	13.6	Williams	13.6	Williams	13.9	Williams	13.9	Williams						
														105.7	Dolomite
120.4	Marble	19.2	Marble	19.2	Marble	20.2	Marble	20.2	Marble	20.3	Marble	20.3	Marble	107.0	Marble
								23.6	Onion Ck.						
128.8	Red Mtn. Jct.	27.6	Red Mtn. Jct.	27.6	Red Mtn. Jct.	27.7	Red Mtn. Jct.								
129.4	Northport	28.2	Northport	28.2	Northport	28.4	Northport	28.5	Northport	28.5	Northport	28.5	Northport	115.3	Northport
								30.5	Hanley's						
				37.0	Boundary	37.2	Boundary	37.2	Boundary	37.3	Boundary	37.3	Boundary	124.1	Boundary
39.1	Waneta	39.1	Waneta	39.1	Waneta	39.3	Waneta	39.3	Waneta	39.4	Waneta	39.4	Waneta	126.2	Waneta
