= International Rail Road Systems =

Former short line railway in Canada

Overview
- Headquarters: Fruitvale, British Columbia
- Reporting mark: IRRS
- Locale: West Kootenay, British Columbia
- Dates of operation: 1998–2010
- Predecessor: Nelson and Fort Sheppard Railway (BNSF)
- Successor: Nelson and Fort Sheppard Railway Corp.

Technical
- Track gauge: 4 ft 8 1/2 in (1,435 mm) standard gauge

The International Rail Road Systems (reporting mark IRRS) was a Canadian short line railway company operating in the West Kootenay region of southeastern British Columbia.

In 1998 the International Reload Systems subsidiary International Rail Road Systems leased the Columbia Gardens–Salmo section of the original Nelson and Fort Sheppard Railway from Burlington Northern and Santa Fe Railway (BNSF). North of Parks was abandoned that year. The railway has operated one EMD GP9 locomotive. A decade later, Fruitvale–Parks was abandoned. In 2010, ATCO Wood Products, the primary user, purchased the section, which was renamed the Nelson and Fort Sheppard Railway Corporation in 2012.

Interlining to the south was BNSF initially, replaced by Kettle Falls International Railway from 2004, and St. Paul & Pacific Northwest Railroad from 2019.

== See also ==
"The Railway". www.bigdoer.com.
