= Chief Tonasket Log Cabin =

Log cabin in Okanogan County, Washington

Coordinates: 48.892605°N 118.598020°W

Okanogan County, Washington

Chief Tonasket Log Cabin is a log cabin in Okanogan County, Washington, once the home of Chief Tonasket, born 1822. It is along Washington State Route 21 near Curlew, Washington. Tonasket moved to the Colville Indian Reservation, now the Old North Half in the Curlew area, after signing the 1883 treaty with the United States. Tonasket died in 1891, and the structure was operated as the "Curlew Store" for a period of time by G.S. Helphry and J. Walters, beginning in 1896, supplying prospectors coming to the Okanogan gold rush.

The original structure was approximately 80 feet (24 m) long and was expanded and framed in when the Curlew Store was put up. The store was dismantled when the Great Northern Railway came through the area and the original log cabin uncovered.
