= British Columbia Highway 41 =

Highway in British Columbia

Highway 41
- Danville Highway
- Highway 41 highlighted in red

Route information
- Maintained by the Ministry of Transportation and Infrastructure
- Length: 1.29 km (0.80 mi)
- Existed: 1968–present

Major junctions
- South end: SR 21 at the U.S. border in Carson
- North end: Highway 3 in Almond Gardens

Location
- Country: Canada
- Province: British Columbia

Highway system
- British Columbia provincial highways
← Highway 39	→ Highway 43

Highway 41 is a very short cross-border spur in the Regional District of Kootenay Boundary in British Columbia. At just 1.29 km (0.80 mi), it is the shortest numbered highway in the province. It connects State Route 21 at the Carson Canada-U.S. border crossing to a point on the Crowsnest Highway (Highway 3) just 3 km (1.9 mi) west of Grand Forks (Almond Gardens). The highway was designated in 1968.

== Major intersections ==
The entire route is in Kootenay Boundary Regional District.

Location	km	mi	Destinations	Notes
Carson	0.00	0.00	SR 21 south – Republic	Continuation into Washington
Carson	0.00	0.00	Canada – United States border at Danville-Carson Border Crossing	
Almond Gardens	1.29	0.80	Highway 3 (Crowsnest Highway) – Grand Forks, Rock Creek, Osoyoos	Northern terminus; road continues as Rilkoff Frontage Road
1.000 mi = 1.609 km; 1.000 km = 0.621 mi: Route transition
