= Kettle Falls International Railway =

Railway in Washington and British Columbia

The Kettle Falls International Railway (reporting mark KFR) is a shortline railroad in the U.S. state of Washington and the Canadian province of British Columbia. This OmniTRAX subsidiary operates 44 miles (71 km) of track.

== Former operators ==
The 83-mile (134 km) Chewelah–Waneta–Columbia Gardens common route and eastern fork was a section of the original Spokane Falls and Northern Railway and Nelson and Fort Sheppard Railway. In 1899, the Great Northern Railway (GN) acquired these two railways. The 77.1-mile (124.1 km) Kettle Falls–Grand Forks–San Poil western fork was a section of the original line built by GN under the VV&E charter for BC, and the Washington and Great Northern Railway (W&GN) charter for WA. GN was consolidated into the Burlington Northern Railroad (BN) in 1970, which merged to become the Burlington Northern and Santa Fe Railway (BNSF) in 1996.

== KFR operation ==
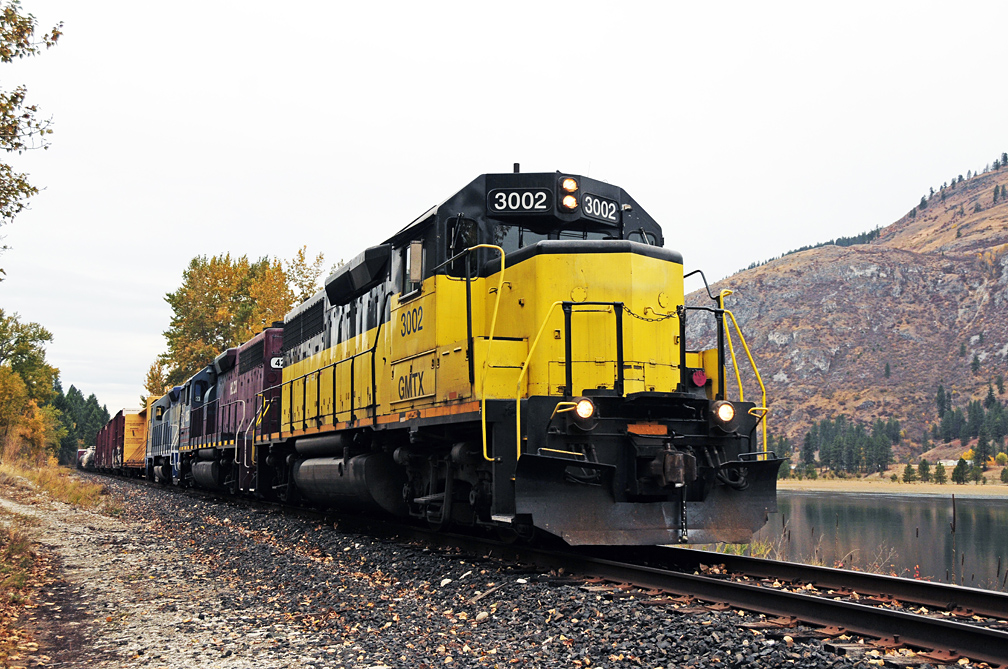
KFR freight train in 2012

In 2004, OmniTRAX leased to purchase the eastern fork, and purchased the western fork, from BNSF, while having running rights on the Chewelah–Kettle Falls section. In 2006, the KFR abandoned the 28.5-mile (45.9 km) San Poil–Danville section.

It is unclear whether the rails across the border were removed at this time or during the subsequent years. In 2019, the St. Paul & Pacific Northwest Railroad (STPP) acquired the Chewelah–Columbia Gardens section.

Initial interlining was with BNSF to the south at Chewelah and Kettle Falls, Grand Forks Railway (GFR) to the northwest at Grand Forks, and International Rail Road Systems (IRRS) to the northeast at Columbia Gardens. In 2010, ATCO Wood Products replaced IRRS, and was renamed the Nelson and Fort Sheppard Railway Corporation in 2012. After the 2019 STPP acquisition, two KFR interlines remained, a new one with STPP at Kettle Falls, and the existing one with GFR.

In 2020, OmniTRAX announced the planned closure of the Grand Forks–Laurier section of the KFR line within three years. A similar proposal in 2008 did not eventuate.
