= Victoria Terminal Railway and Ferry Company =

Former railway and ferry operation in BC, Canada

The Victoria Terminal Railway and Ferry Company (VTRF) was a standard gauge shortline railway company operating two railway lines and a connecting ferry that linked Vancouver Island and the south arm of the Fraser River in Metro Vancouver.

== Construction and interchange ==
In March 1901, the Great Northern Railway (GN) acquired a controlling interest in the VV&E, owner of the VTRF, which in October commenced work on a railway line in Victoria. In 1902, the VTRF acquired the Victoria and Sidney Railway (V&S). In May 1903, the VTRF opened the short Cloverdale–Port Guichon railway link and commenced the Port Guichon–Sidney train ferry that connected with the V&S. This daily ferry service carried passengers and up to eight railway freight cars. The wharf largely parallelled the dyke.

Cloverdale was an interchange on the New Westminster Southern Railway Company (NWSR), a GN subsidiary, which at the time connected today's Pacific Highway Border Crossing with Brownsville (Surrey docks). In 1904, the New Westminster Bridge replaced the Fraser River ferry crossing to New Westminster, from which point the Vancouver, Westminster and Yukon Railway charter predicated access to Downtown Vancouver, where the GN station stood immediately to the north of the existing Pacific Central Station.

== Operation and demise ==
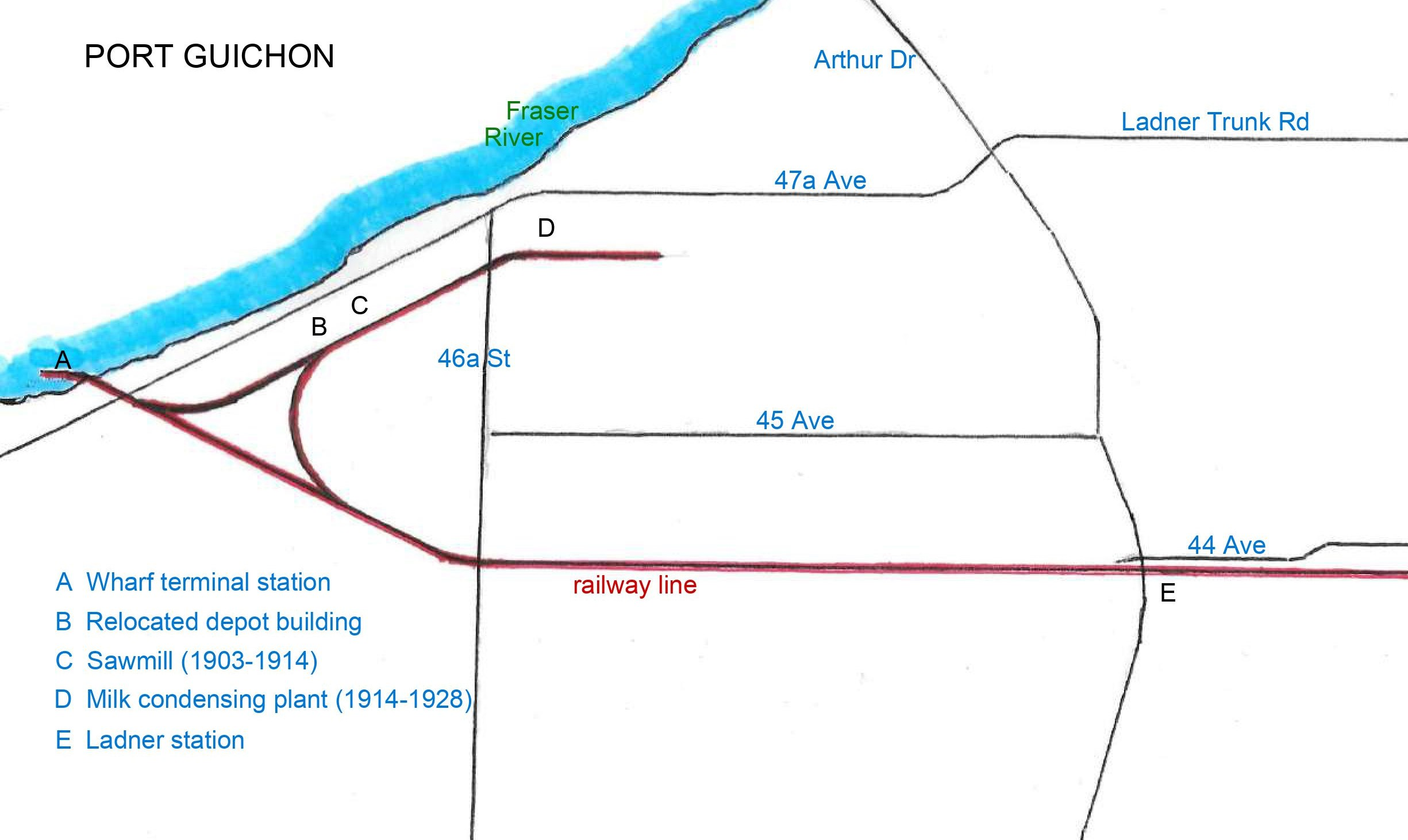
Port Guichon railway route

The wye was initially used for turning locomotives and accessing the Grant and Kerr sawmill. Following stiff competition from Canadian Pacific Railway steamers from Vancouver and New Westminster (the latter calling at Port Guichon) and the withdrawal of an expected subsidy from the City of Victoria, the GN passenger ferry discontinued in December 1904. At that time, a rail barge commenced operating either from Port Guichon or upriver. The six-car capacity service stopped in 1919 when the V&S closed. A 2.4-by-3.7-metre (8 by 12 ft) passenger shelter shed stood at the original Ladner station site, which was later renamed Challucthan. An 89-metre (293 ft) bridge spanned the then much wider Challucthan slough. When the sawmill was rebuilt in 1914, a siding was installed.

In 1924, the depot building, initially on the wharf, was loaded onto a flatcar and carried to a new location on Savoy St. Freight from the sawmill and milk condensing plant at Port Guichon and crops from East Delta became the major source of revenue. The Pacific milk condensing plant, which opened in 1914, relocated to the Abbotsford area in 1928. The facility became a pea cannery, which closed about 1933. The final scheduled monthly freight train ran in August 1935. The Ladner Lumber Company declared bankruptcy in 1938. That year, the line was abandoned and the remaining track soon lifted back to Cloverdale.

In 1943, the Ladner Fisherman's Co-operative Association purchased the Savoy St station for a meeting hall. In the 1960s, the building, which holds a historic places designation, was substantially enlarged. Apart from the most westerly portion, the Cloverdale–Ladner right-of-way became the east–west section of the BC Rail track to Roberts Bank Superport, which opened in 1970.

== Ladner passenger rail ==
Passenger Service
Type	Period		Frequency	Terminal	Via	Terminal
	1903	1905	Daily	Port Guichon	Cloverdale, New Westminster	Downtown Vancouver
	1905	1905	Tue, Thu, Sat.	Port Guichon	Cloverdale, New Westminster	Downtown Vancouver
	1905	1905	Mon, Wed, Fri.	Port Guichon		Cloverdale
	1905	1905	Mon, Fri.	Port Guichon		Cloverdale
	1905	1907	Mon.	Port Guichon		Cloverdale
mixed	1907	1908	Mon, Wed, Fri.	Port Guichon	Cloverdale, New Westminster	Downtown Vancouver
mixed	1908	1909	Tue, Fri.	Port Guichon	Cloverdale, New Westminster	Downtown Vancouver
mixed	1909	1909	Fri.	Port Guichon	Cloverdale	New Westminster
mixed	1909	1916	Daily	Port Guichon	Cloverdale	New Westminster
mixed	1918	1918	Daily	Port Guichon		Cloverdale
mixed	1919	1925	Daily	Port Guichon	Cloverdale, Abbotsford	Sumas
			Stations renamed: Guichon became Ladner; Ladner became Challucthan			
mixed	1926	1926	Daily	Ladner	Cloverdale, Abbotsford	Sumas
mixed	1927	1929	Mon, Wed, Fri.	Ladner	Cloverdale, Abbotsford	Sumas
mixed	1929	1929	Mon, Wed, Fri.	Ladner		Cloverdale
mixed	1930	1930	Tue, Fri.	Ladner		Colebrook
mixed	1930	1931	Sat.	Ladner		Colebrook

== See also ==
"1939 BC highway map". www.reddit.com. 29 January 2021.
