= Spokane and British Columbia Railway =

Railway between Canada and the United States, 1900-1925

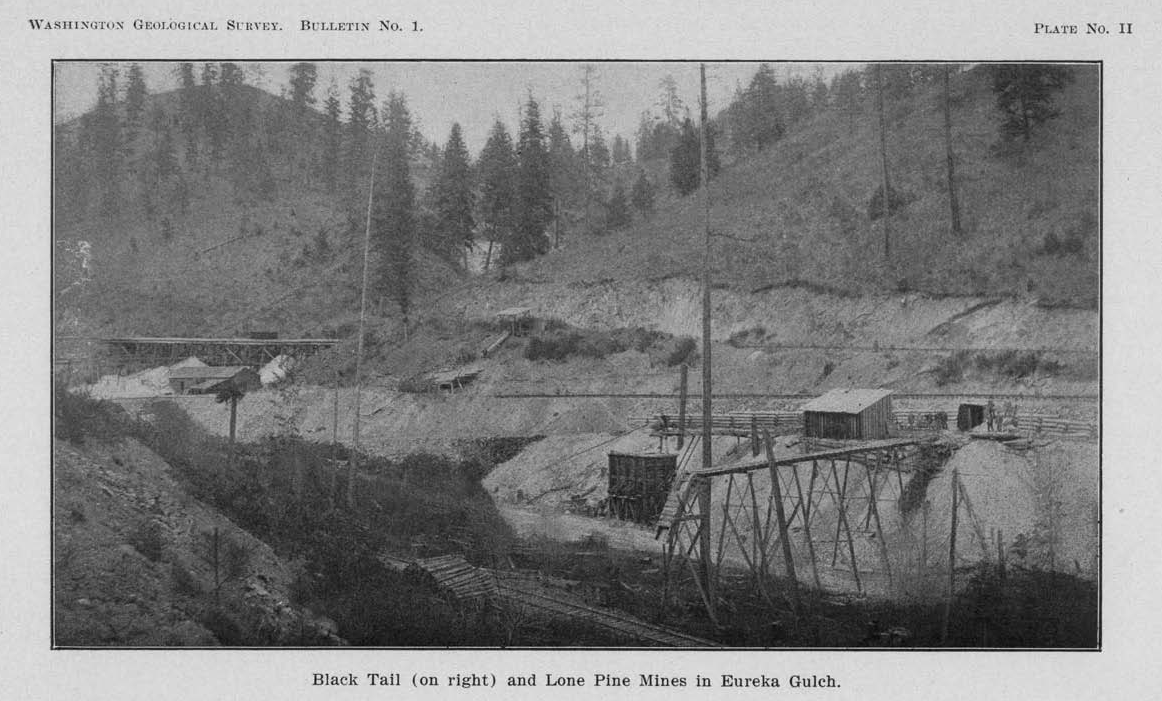
- Eureka Gulch, 1910. Great Northern railbeds in the center, Spokane and British Columbia line in the foreground

Overview
- Headquarters: Republic, Washington
- Reporting mark: S&BC
- Locale: Ferry County, Washington
- Dates of operation: 1900–1925
- Predecessor: Republic and Kettle Valley Railway
- Successor: None

Technical
- Track gauge: 4 ft 8 1/2 in (1,435 mm) standard gauge
- Length: 40.559 miles (65.273 km)

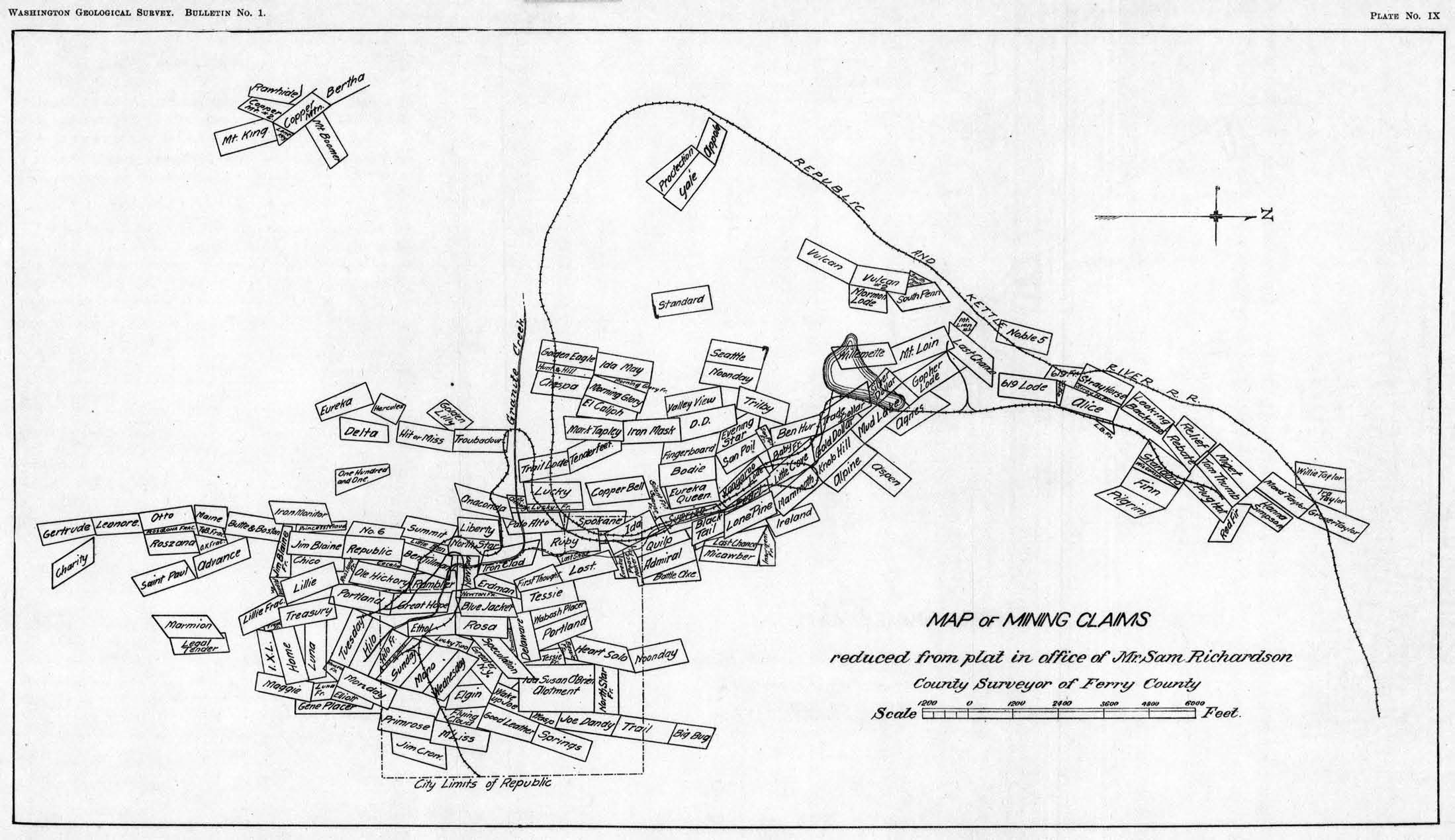
Republic District mine plats, showing the Great Northern and Spokane & British Columbia lines

The Spokane and British Columbia Railway (reporting mark S&BC), originally the Republic and Kettle Valley Railway, was a short-lived standard-gauge railway based out of Republic, Washington, United States. The S&BC operated between Republic, Grand Forks, British Columbia, and Lynch Creek, British Columbia. The line was locally known as the "Hot Air Line" in both the Boundary District of British Columbia and Republic due to the shaky nature of the company's financing and the grandiose nature of its publicity. The company was incorporated in 1900 in Republic and was bought out in 1901 by the Canadian Republic & Grand Forks Railway Company, which retained the Republic and Kettle Valley Railway name after the acquisition. The company reorganized in 1905 under the Spokane and British Columbia Railway name, operating service on the line through 1919, and was officially removed from the active corporation listing in 1925.

== Formation and early years ==
The Republic & Kettle Valley Railway Company (R&KV) was initially incorporated on August 8, 1900, with J. Stratton as president, upon acquisition by the rival Republic & Grand Forks Railway Company (R&GF) which was formed in Grand Forks by Tracy Holland and Wylie Morris. Holland obtained permitting from the provincial government to build a rail line from Grand Forks south to the international border, and then with help from Morris permits to build south from the border to Republic. The initial financing was to be supplied by Hollands brother F. Holland along with funds from J. Stratton and T. Coffee, all three being employees of the Toronto based Dominion Permanent Trust Company. On March 18, 1901, Morris obtained the needed permits from the Secretary of the Interior to build a Grand Forks to Republic rail line across the northern portion of the Colville Indian Reservation. Upon return from Washington, D.C. Morris worked with the R&GF company to buy out the R&KV company, after which the R&GF Railway board relinquished the survey rights for the route. Organization of the R&KV Company had been undertaken by Montreal business interests who were backing the Republic Mine on Republic and the company had secured permission for a rail line along the same route on May 8, 1900. The money needed to start building was advanced from Toronto by Stratton, Coffee, F. Holland, and an additional backer named Kleopher, all of the Dominion Permanent Trust. The company incorporated in Republic on August 8, 1900, with J. Stratton as president, and the first draft of route maps across the northern Colville Reservation were submitted for review on April 23, 1901. Review by a worker from the Crow, Flathead Commission assessed damage to already granted tribal allotments crossed by the proposed route. A check for the damages amounting to US$5,548.05 (equivalent to about $214,700 in 2025) was transmitted by Coffee, then vice president of the Republic & Kettle Valley Railway company to the Crow, Flathead Commission.

Construction of the line between Danville, Washington, at the Canadian border and Republic was contracted to the Republic and Grand Forks Construction Company on May 28, 1901. The construction company, itself owned by Stratton and formed that same day, was considered by local press to be in essence the same company as the Republic and Kettle Valley company. The construction was disrupted by survey work and construction by the Washington & Great Northern Railway, a subsidiary company of the Great northern Railway.

Survey work by the Washington & Great Northern also began in 1901, although permits were not granted until July 13, and the company was notified of approval for survey—but not construction—on July 18. Notice was given to the Crow and Flathead Commission that some construction on several allotments had already started. The final maps were transmitted to the commission on August 13, 1901, and review showed that the proposed route closely paralleled, crossed, and in some sections used the same bed as the Republic and Kettle Valley Railway. W. Morris, acting as counsel for the R. & K.V. Company, lodged a protest against the W&GN with the commission, which ordered a temporary cessation of work by the W&GN. However the commission ruled in favor of the W&GN company for the initial mapping and granted permission for them to resume building, while forcing the R&KV to survey an updated route north.

Due to the grandiose claims made by the company and the shaky financial dealing, the line was regionally known as the "Hot Air Line". Full operation began in 1902, with a Grand Forks band travelling to Republic to celebrate the increased ease of commerce between the towns. The rail line paralleled the Washington & Great Northern spur line from Republic through Malo and Curlew, Washington to Danville. The northern was initially surveyed by the Republic and Kettle River company, but they were forced to build on higher ground beyond the Washington & Great Northern land boundaries. At the border, the line leased rail access from the Kettle Valley Railway to connect to Grand Forks 4 mi (6.4 km) north of the border and then on another 18 mi (29 km) to Lynch Creek.

== Southern line ==
On 2 January 1902, the railroad was also approved by the Secretary of the Interior to conduct surveying for a southern line though the Colville Reservation along the Sanpoil River. From the southeastern boundary of the reservation the railway located a line along the Columbia River and then up the Spokane River to a junction with the then defunct Seattle, Lake Shore and Eastern Railway road bed. Another juncture, with the Okanogan Electric Railway, was planned near Peach, after which the two would share the line into Spokane. The mapped route for the southern extension was approved 17 October 1905 was approved by the Secretary of the Interior. Included in mapped route was location of the proposed branch line starting near the mouth of the Spokane River at the Columbia River and thence traveling along the eastern shore of the Columbia to "Sand Bar Landing" which was also the terminus of the Big Bend Transit Company rail line. The Secretary of the Interior gave notice upon map approval that consideration for the branch line would not take place until construction of the railways main line south had been completed. During the same year, the small Belcher Mountain Railway had also surveyed a southern line from Republic across the Colville Reservation to the Columbia. The company had been directed that in any case where the proposed route paralleled another rail line within 10 miles, it was to give justification for the benefit of public interest for two lines. Upon review of the proposed route, submitted 24 November 1905, the Secretary of the Interior noted it to cross, re-cross, and at times use the same exact bed as that which had already been mapped by the Spokane and British Columbia Railway. The Belch Mountain Railway maps were not approved due to failing to meet submission requirements and notice of the conflicting route was given.

The full extent of the line was a proposed 140 mi (230 km) route connecting Republic to Spokane, Washington. With the 1905 reorganization of the company into the Spokane and British Columbia Railway, an additional $4,000,000 in stocks was authorized for the southern line. However, as of a 1915 valuation by the US Commerce Commission, little actual building or prep work had been made on the southern route due to building debts, and none of the additional stocks had been issued. On June 30, 1915, the S&BC had a total operating loss of US$1,109,322.90 (equivalent to about $35,304,931.11 in 2025) at the end of the 1915 fiscal year.

== Washington & Great Northern Railway rivalry ==
On 4 June 1898 permission was granted by the Secretary of the Interior to the Washington Improvement and Development Company for a right of way running from the mouth of the San Poil river on the Columbia north to the international boarder. The grant covered the mapping of rail, telegraph, and telephone lines plus lands for switch tracks, sidings, stations, and other buildings. The mapping was subsequently completed, submitted, and approved by the Secretary of the Interior by 27 November 1899. Before work was started on the approved route, the Washington Improvement and Development Company was bought out by the Washington & Great Northern Railway Company and as a result all of the grants and rights the Washington Improvement and Development Company passed to the new owners. After the buyout, no actual work as performed by the Washington & Great Northern to grade or improve any of the planned rail line. The company did continue to perform right of way surveys based on the original work, with a proposed branch line being proposed up the West Fork Sanpoil River into Aeneas Valley and on to the Okanogan River Valley beyond. One of the provisions in the original 4 June 1898 permission was that within six months of a route filing, the company was to begin grading on the approved section or the grant would be void. Additionally section 5 of the grant specified at least 25 m (0.025 km) of line were to be built through the Colville Reservation within two years of the grant or the right would be forfeited back to the US government. The 17 October 1905 route approved by the Secretary of the Interior for the Spokane and British Columbia Railways southern line used much of the same route that had previously been granted to the Washington Improvement and Development Company.

When the route was approved the Washington & Great Northern Railway Company filed a lawsuit with the Ferry County Superior court, demanding the development of the approved route by the Spokane and British Columbia Railway immediately be halted, as the land in question was still granted to Washington & Great Northern Railway. After a trail without jury, the case was decided 5 February 1907 by Judge J. Carey who agreed with the Spokane and British Columbia Railways assertion of ownership of the route. This decision was subsequently appealed to the Washington state supreme court, with Washington & Great Northern Railway Company arguing that the terms of the grant could only be enforced by the government. They maintained that the Spokane & British Columbia could not force a decision outside of this pathway. The court held trial and handed down a unanimous verdict on 13 April 1908 penned by Judge J. Root reversing the Superior court judgement. The judiciary examined federal case history which dealt with similar cases of granted lands, deciding the provision requiring land development could only be enforced by the United States government, such as through an act of Congress, judicial proceeding, or an "office found" proceeding.

The Spokane & British Columbia proceeded to appeal the verdict to the US Supreme court on 29 November 1910, who heard the case and delivered the final verdict in the litigation on 3 January 1911. The justices, with William R. Day delivering the opinion, agreed with the findings of the Washington State Supreme Court, stating that the grant provisions could only be enforced by a US governmental agency, and not though the claims of forfeiture asserted by the Spokane & British Columbia. The ruling is considered precedential and been cited in several later Supreme court cases though 2009. Two years later, in 1912, the United States congress passed an act granting both railways rights to lay rail right-of-ways through the Sanpoil Valley and across the Colville Reservation. In turn, the Great Northern officially abandoned its claim to the Sanpoil right-of-way in 1913, with word that work done on a Bluestem to Miles spur in the area of the Sanpoil River mouth was for a line North To Kettle Falls along the Columbia.

== Later years and abandonment ==
On 16 August 1916, a hearing by the Public Services Commission of Washington in Republic. The purview of the hearing was to address a request by the Great Northern Railway that the Great Northern and the Spokane and British Columbia Railways no longer have any physical connection. Both railways indicated they no longer wished to engage in the switching charges or privileges granted by interconnection of the respective lines. This request was granted by the commission.

The final officially scheduled train run on the line was September 27, 1919, and only a few sporadic runs happened after that date, and the last run was in November 1919. The company officially filed a request to abandon its rail line with the Interstate Commerce Commission, with an advisory position held by the Public Service Commission of Washington. The commission held a hearing on January 20, 1921, to ascertain if there was any objection to the filed request or if any hardship would result on the region serviced by the rail line. It was concluded that the Great Northern was providing the needed service in the area and a final order by the hearing commission was made on February 2, 1921, by that the application should be granted. The line was listed as an active corporation in the Seventeenth Biennial Report of the Washington Secretary of State for 1920–1922, but was stricken from the Washington State Corporation records on July 1, 1925, in the Nineteenth Biennial Report.

== Rolling stock ==
In 1912, the company had three steam locomotives and a small inventory of rolling stock mostly geared towards mining and freight hauling. The S&BC registered only two passenger-freight combination coaches in service, while having a fleet of four boxcars, ten ore dump cars and thirteen flatcars. All of the rolling stock was marked with S. & B.C. along with the car number, 100–104 for boxcars, 500–510 for ore dump cars, and 600–613 for flat cars.
