= Nelson and Fort Sheppard Railway =

Historic railway

The Nelson and Fort Sheppard Railway (N&FS) is a historic railway that operated in the West Kootenay region of southern British Columbia. The railway's name derived from a misspelling of Fort Shepherd, a former Hudson's Bay Company fort, on the west bank of the Columbia River immediately north of the border.

The N&FS connected the city of Nelson with the Canada–United States border at Waneta.

== Incursion into BC ==
In 1890, Daniel Chase Corbin, an American financier, built his Spokane Falls and Northern Railway (SF&N) north to Little Dalles, served by the northern routes of the Columbia and Kootenay Steam Navigation Company (C&KSN). In 1891, the Canadian Pacific Railway (CP) hoped to head off the American incursion into the rich mining areas of the West Kootenay, by opening the Columbia and Kootenay Railway (C&K). This line ran between Robson (near Castlegar) and Nelson, along the unnavigable section of the Kootenay River linking Kootenay Lake and the Arrow Lakes.

The BC government was unsympathetic to any proposal that was merely a feeder for US railroads. Using Canadian businessmen as a front, and promising to connect the railway to the coast, Corbin obtained a provincial charter for the N&FS in 1891. This act made the $750,000 CP investment in the C&K of little value, until further CP expansion began in 1898. In 1893, the N&FS received a federal charter, declaring it to be a work for the greater advantage of Canada. The connection to the coast was never built but the railway reached Nelson in 1893. With an all-rail route to the United States and links to American transcontinental railroads, the N&FS offered better market access than CP.

Map showing Nelson and Fort Sheppard Railway

== Route ==
From south to north, the railway joined the SF&N on the east shore of the Columbia River at the US border, and crossed a 500-foot bridge over the Pend-d'Oreille River at Waneta, since repurposed as a highway crossing. The railway ascended the Columbia Valley, the Salmo River valley, and descended to the northeast of Nelson to Troup (also known as Five Mile Point), which became the temporary terminus until 1894.

== Nelson train stations ==
Mountain station was in the current parking area at the south end of Cherry St.

In 1895, a rail loop at Troup, enabled the line to reverse direction, border the west arm of the lake, and terminate by the Cottonwood St. and Maple St. intersection, at what was then Bogustown (now Fairview).

In December 1899, the inaugural streetcar (tram) ran southwestward from a terminus at the adjacent Cottonwood St. and First St. intersection to the then Railway St. and Baker St. intersection (now BC Highway 3A)/Baker St.), which served the C&K station at the former foot of Railway. In April 1900, the tramway hill section commenced. This line turned from Kootenay St. northeastward into Houston St, terminating at the Stanley St. intersection, requiring a 0.9-kilometre (0.6 mi) walk from the closest point to the N&FS Mountain station.

To create the Nelson–Procter spur in 1900, CP bought the Nelson–Troup right-of-way from N&FS, which received trackage rights on this section.

In January 1901, on the opening of the new CP C&K station (now the visitor centre), two blocks southwest of the former station, the N&FS terminal moved from Bogustown to share this facility, and the tramway was extended along the Baker St. alignment adjacent to this point. That same day, the final part of the hill route changed, turning northeastward on Observatory St. and south eastward on Stanley St. to the previous terminus. The new CP station became the northwestern terminus for this route. However, from May 1901, unless requested by a passenger, or meeting the 11:35 am or 10:10 pm trains, the tramway terminus became Stanley/Baker streets. In 1902, the tramway extension to the station was abandoned, which was likely the time that the two tramway routes were combined into a single through route.

In November 1910, the final part of the hill section reopened as a loop. Uphill was Stanley St, Latimer St, Hendryx St, Carbonate St, Cedar St, and Innes St, with the downhill return unchanged. The amended route offered a short 0.2-kilometre (0.12 mi) walk from the closest point to the N&FS Mountain station. When the tramway ceased in June 1949, the replacement bus route appears to have been no closer than Josephine St. to this station.

== All train stations ==
Stations
1893	Mile	1905	Mile	1907	1913	Mile	1922	Mile	1928	Mile	1933	Mile	1951
Waneta	140.3	Waneta	39.1	Waneta	Waneta	39.3	Waneta	39.4	Waneta	39.4	Waneta	126.2	Waneta
	144.2	Sayward	43.0	Sayward	Col. Gdns.	43.2	Col. Gdns.	43.3	Col. Gdns.	43.3	Col. Gdns.	130.0	Col. Gdns.
Beaver	149.5	Beaver	48.3	Fruitvale	Fruitvale	48.5	Fruitvale	48.6	Fruitvale	48.6	Fruitvale	135.3	Fruitvale
										54.2	Parks	140.9	Parks
Meadows						58.1	Meadows	58.3	Meadows	58.3	Meadows	145.0	Meadows
	162.0	Erie	60.8	Erie	Erie	61.1	Erie	61.1	Erie	61.1	Erie	147.9	Erie
Salmon	164.8	Salmo	63.6	Salmo	Salmo	63.8	Salmo	63.9	Salmo	63.9	Salmo	150.6	Salmo
						67.0	Boulder Mill	67.2	Boulder Mill	67.2	Boulder Mill	153.9	Boulder Mill
	172.4	Ymir	71.2	Ymir	Ymir	71.4	Ymir	71.5	Ymir	71.5	Ymir	158.3	Ymir
Hall	179.6	Hall	78.4	Hall	Hall	78.6	Hall	78.6	Hall	78.6	Hall	165.4	Hall
Summit	182.9	Summit	81.7	Summit	Apex	81.9	Apex	82.0	Apex	82.0	Apex	168.7	Apex
Nelson	189.6	Mountain	88.4	Mountain	Mountain	88.7	Mountain	88.8	S. Nelson	88.8	S. Nelson	175.5	S. Nelson
Kootenay	194.5	Troup Jctn.	93.3	Troup Jctn.	Troup Jctn.	93.5	Troup Jctn.	93.6	Troup Jctn.	93.6	Troup Jctn.	180.3	Troup Jctn.
	200.0	Nelson	98.8	Nelson	Nelson	98.1	Nelson	99.0	Nelson	99.0	Nelson	185.8	Nelson

In 1951, passenger train service ceased, leaving only Auto Interurban (assumedly in association with Greyhound) bus travel via Trail, which followed a completely different route. The former route became freight only.

== Operators & abandonment ==
On July 1, 1898, the Northern Pacific Railway (NP) acquired the SF&N. On June 30 1899, the Great Northern Railway (GN) purchased the NP stock. The GN was consolidated into the Burlington Northern Railroad (BN) in 1970, which merged to become the Burlington Northern and Santa Fe Railway (BNSF) in 1996.

In 1997, BNSF sold the abandoned Salmo–Troup rails to Canadian Rail Track Materials for removal, and the provincial government acquired the right-of-way for conversion to the Salmo-Troup Rail Trail.

In 1998, International Reload Systems subsidiary, International Rail Road Systems (IRRS), leased the Columbia Gardens–Salmo section, interlining with BNSF to the south, and abandoned north of Parks. IRRS handled concentrates for the Trail smelter and lumber shipments. In 2010, ATCO Wood Products purchased the section, which was renamed the Nelson and Fort Sheppard Railway Corporation in 2012.

In 2004, OmniTRAX subsidiary, Kettle Falls International Railway, leased to purchase Chewelah, Washington–Waneta–Columbia Gardens. In 2019, Progressive Rail subsidiary, St. Paul & Pacific Northwest Railroad, acquired ownership.

== Notable court case ==
In the 1890s, the Nelson and Fort Sheppard Railway was involved in a court case which resulted in a significant ruling on Canadian constitutional law. A train operated by the railway killed two horses. The owner of the horses sued for damages, under a provincial statute. Although the owner of the horses was successful at trial, the British Columbia Supreme Court overturned the decision, ruling that the provincial statute did not apply to the railway, which was under federal jurisdiction. That ruling was upheld by the Judicial Committee of the Privy Council, at that time the highest appellate body in the British Empire: Madden v Nelson and Fort Sheppard Railway Co.
