= Curlew, Washington =

- Census-designated place
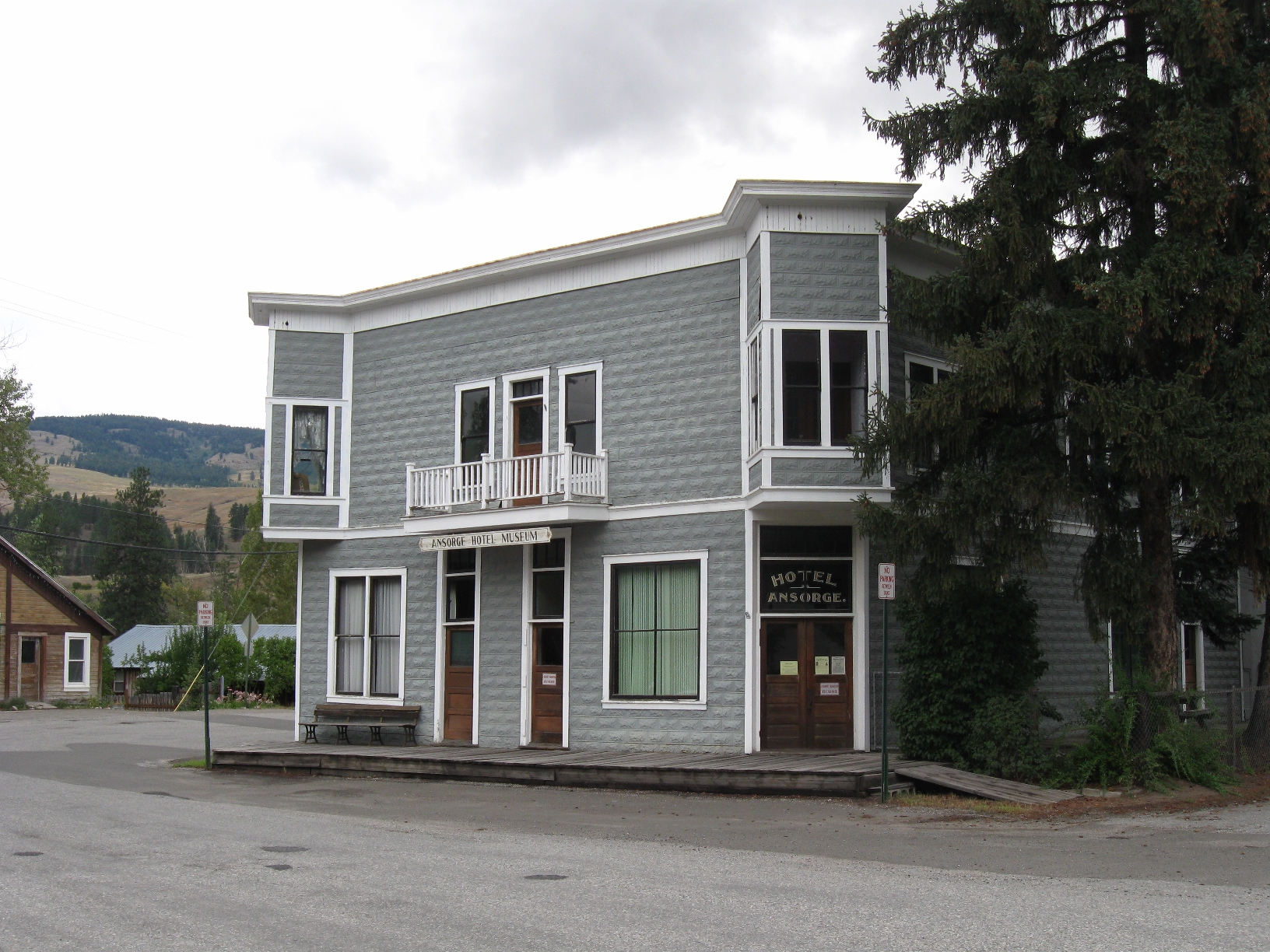
- Ansorge Hotel Museum in Curlew

- Location within Washington (state) Location within the United States
- Coordinates: 48°52′30″N 118°36′17″W
- Country: United States
- State: Washington
- County: Ferry

Area
  - Total: 0.76 sq mi (1.96 km^{2})
  - Land: 0.76 sq mi (1.96 km^{2})
  - Water: 0 sq mi (0.0 km^{2})
- Elevation: 1,801 ft (549 m)

Population (2010 census)
  - Total: 118
  - Density: 156/sq mi (60.1/km^{2})
- Time zone: UTC-8 (Pacific (PST))
  - Summer (DST): UTC-7 (PDT)
- ZIP code: 99118
- Area code: 509
- GNIS feature ID: 2586732
- FIPS code: 53-16165

Curlew is an unincorporated community and census-designated place (CDP) located in northwestern Ferry County, Washington, United States, between Malo and Danville on State Route 21. The BNSF Railway ran through the town. The historic Ansorge Hotel is located in Curlew. As of the 2020 census, Curlew had a population of 105. The settlement is named for the curlew birds once prevalent in the area.

== Geography ==
Curlew is located at the confluence of Long Alec Creek and the Kettle River. Its elevation is 1,800 feet (550 m) above sea level. Via State Route 21, it is 21 miles (34 km) north of Republic, the Ferry County seat, and 10 miles (16 km) south of the Canadian border.

One of the most popular sites on the Kettle River in summer is "the Old Swimming Hole" near the center of town. Curlew was a pick-up point for moonshine that was dropped in the Kettle River. The tradition is still celebrated on the first Sunday in June each year during the Curlew Barrel Derby Days. A barrel is set adrift in the Kettle River at the Job Corps Bridge, and local citizens bet on when it will reach town.

== History ==
=== Early community ===
In 1896, two traders, Guy S. Helphry and J. Walters, set up a general store at an old ferry crossing near the junction of Curlew Creek and the Kettle River. The site around the store grew into a collection of log buildings and other stores. In 1898, a post office was established and the town was named "Curlew". Miners, railroad workers, natives, and others passed through the region and by 1901, a bridge was built across the Kettle River and the community had grown to a population of 200. Nearby mines such as Drummer, Lancaster and Panama grew. Curlew's population and expansion peaked at this time, and the town contained two general stores, two saloons, a hotel, two livery stables, a dry goods store and several other businesses.

The Curlew Air Force Station, part of the network of Air Defense Command radar stations, was near the area and was operational in the 1950s. As of 2023, the radar site no longer exists, and the base, 10 miles (16 km) northwest of Curlew up the Kettle River valley, is in use by Job Corps.

=== Railroads ===
In fall 1901, the Republic and Kettle Valley Railway, and Spokane Falls and Northern Railway, a subsidiary of the Great Northern Railway, were building competing Grand Forks, British Columbia to Republic, Washington lines. About a mile north of Curlew, the Republic and Kettle Valley grade passed over the Great Northern one. In January 1902, Great Northern construction crews were unsuccessful in pulling down the Republic and Kettle Valley trestlework that crossed the Great Northern track. Law enforcement officers diffused a series of subsequent confrontations. Republic and Kettle Valley Railway, which began the Grand Forks to St. Peter's Creek passenger service in March 1902, extended the line to five or six miles north of Republic in April, and held a symbolic last spike ceremony. That July, the Great Northern Marcus, Washington to Republic via Grand Forks passenger service began. Great Northern began Curlew to Midway, British Columbia passenger service in December 1905.

In 1919, the Republic and Kettle Valley Railway, then known as the Spokane and British Columbia Railway was officially declared bankrupt with all services ceasing that year, and the track being subsequently abandoned. In 1935, Great Northern abandoned the Curlew to Molson route. In 2006, the Kettle Falls International Railway, the Great Northern successor, abandoned the 28.5 mi (45.9 km) San Poil Lake to Danville, Washington section, ending all railroad service through Curlew.

== Demographics ==
Historical population
Census	Pop.	Note	%±
2010	118		—
2020	105		−11.0%
U.S. Decennial Census; 2000 2010

Curlew first appeared as a census designated place in the 2010 U.S. census.

=== Racial and ethnic composition ===
Curlew CDP, Washington – Racial and ethnic composition Note: the US Census treats Hispanic/Latino as an ethnic category. This table excludes Latinos from the racial categories and assigns them to a separate category. Hispanics/Latinos may be of any race.
Race / Ethnicity (NH = Non-Hispanic)	Pop 2010	Pop 2020	% 2010	% 2020
White alone (NH)	110	88	93.22%	83.81%
Black or African American alone (NH)	0	2	0.00%	1.90%
Native American or Alaska Native alone (NH)	0	0	0.00%	0.00%
Asian alone (NH)	0	2	0.00%	1.90%
Native Hawaiian or Pacific Islander alone (NH)	0	0	0.00%	0.00%
Other race alone (NH)	0	0	0.00%	0.00%
Mixed race or Multiracial (NH)	4	9	3.39%	8.57%
Hispanic or Latino (any race)	4	4	3.39%	3.81%
Total	118	105	100.00%	100.00%

== Roads ==
Curlew is the western terminus of county road 602, which travels over the 4,600 ft (1,400 m) Boulder-Deer Creek Pass between Curlew and U.S. Route 395 south of Orient, Washington. The route is the northern-most of the Washington passes over the Kettle River Range. Just to the south of Curlews center, the road crosses Highway 21 and becomes the West Kettle River Road, county road 50.

== Notable person ==
- Bud Podbielan, professional baseball player

== See also ==
- Ferry-Midway Border Crossing
