= Almond Gardens =

Human settlement in British Columbia, Canada

Coordinates: 49°01′00″N 118°30′00″W

Almond Gardens is a populated community in the Similkameen Division Yale Land District of British Columbia. The small community is southwest of Grand Forks, British Columbia.
