= Boundary, Washington =

Ghost town in Washington (state)

- Ghost town
- Location within Washington (state) Location within the United States
- Coordinates: 48°59′18″N 117°38′13″W
- Country: United States
- State: Washington
- County: Stevens

Population (1890s)
  - Total: 900
- Time zone: UTC-8 (Pacific (PST))
  - Summer (DST): UTC-7 (PDT)

Boundary is a ghost town located in Stevens County, Washington, United States. The town was located near the Canada–US border and near the Columbia River. Boundary's peak years were during the 1890s. The population was around 900. The town started off as a railroad camp. When the railroad finally spanned the wild Pend Oreille with a bridge, the railroad workers quickly moved on leaving the town of Boundary deserted. The town contained the Boundary Hotel, post office, and general store. A town called "New Boundary" came into being south of the original townsite and the old town eventually vanished.
