= Victoria and Sidney Railway =

Railway on Vancouver Island, BC, Canada

The Victoria and Sidney Railway Company (V&S) was one of three railways to operate on the Saanich Peninsula of southern Vancouver Island, British Columbia. Opened in 1894 the route largely closed in 1919 but a section of track remained in use until 1935.

== Planning and construction ==
A rail–steam–rail link was proposed by BC Premier Amor de Cosmos in 1871, but then voted down by the Victoria City Council. The Victoria to Sidney rail route survey began in 1888, and the City of Victoria established the V&S in 1892 to build a rail line to serve the Saanich Peninsula.

After receiving tax concessions and various loans, final surveying and grading soon began on the route which passed through nearly every important community on the way.

== Early operation ==
In 1894, service began from Topaz Avenue (close to the Mayfair Mall today) to downtown Sidney (intersection of Beacon Ave. and 1st). At the time, the Saanich Peninsula was mostly forested with only limited parts cleared. Timber and cord-wood logging was a key industry in the area and provided a major source of freight revenue for the line. Since all the early V&S locomotives were wood burners, local residents quickly dubbed the train the "Cordwood Limited". A slightly less complimentary name was the "tri-weekly" because although it ran every day, it tried weakly.

In the early days of operation, the train proved popular for excursions to the agricultural fairs at Saanichton and for picnickers travelling to Bazan Bay, just south of Sidney, and other areas of the peninsula. Before the automobile era, the roads were in very poor condition, and the train was the common means of travel.

The V&S operated three locomotives. In 1893, No.1 was delivered and helped in tracklaying. This 40-ton 2-6-0 Mogul class locomotive was built in Kingston, Ontario by the Canadian Locomotive Company. It was well suited to the local service and was the mainstay of the railroad. It handled the 7% grade at Royal Oak much better than the other two locomotives. The No.2 was a much older 4-4-0 built in 1875. The engine's large drivers caused slipping on the grades, limiting assignment to the lightest trains. The No.3 was a heavier 4-4-0 and like the No.1 was better suited to the steep grades on the V&S.

== Mainland connection ==
In 1902, the Victoria Terminal Railway and Ferry Company, controlled by the Great Northern Railway (GN), purchased the V&S, The planned extension to connect with the Esquimalt and Nanaimo Railway depot in downtown Victoria never went beyond City Hall ( Pandora and Broad St). In 1903, the VTRF opened the short Cloverdale–Port Guichon railway link, and commenced the Port Guichon–Sidney train ferry that connected with the V&S. However, V&S traffic continued to decline with service deteriorating

== Competition and demise ==
A further blow came in 1913 when the BC Electric Railway company (BCER) opened an interurban service to Deep Bay (now Deep Cove) n North Saanich, complementing its well established streetcar lines in the city of Victoria. The BCER offered a more frequent passenger service than the V&S, which was hampered by outdated equipment. Business on the V&S briefly picked up and competition between the two railways was fierce. GN replaced the old wooden cars on the V&S with a modern gasoline-powered unit built by the McKeen Motor Car Company.

With the construction of the Canadian Northern line (later becoming Canadian National (CN) Patricia Bay Subdivision) from Victoria to Patricia Bay, the competition became too intense. After GN pulled out of operating the V&S in 1917, service continued for another year but finally shut down in 1919, and the line was abandoned. A small stretch was purchased by CN to serve the Sidney area. CN abandoned its Patricia Bay Sub north of McKenzie Ave in 1935, and the remaining portion of the V&S was abandoned.

Part of the western side of the walking trail that circles Elk/Beaver Lake is a rail trail on the former rail bed. The V&S right-of-way linked Keating Cross Road and the Prairie Inn at Mt Newton Cross Road. In 1926, the southern part of this segment, which joins E. Saanich Road, was named "Veyaness Road" (V&S).

== Map ==
- "Pre-World War II North Saanich compilation map". www.ardmoregolfcourse.com.
