= Columbia Gardens =

Ghost town in British Columbia, Canada

Coordinates: 49.0686°N 117.5948°W

Columbia Gardens is in the West Kootenay region of southern British Columbia. The locality is east of Trail, and near the Boundary-Waneta Border Crossing.

William Parsons Sayward gave his name to Sayward village on Vancouver Island, and also to the ghost town in this locality. The Kootenay settlement was established in 1893, about a quarter of a mile above Beaver Creek, which would be over three quarters of a mile north of the Sayward station, a flag stop by 1897. In 1907, a much larger area called Columbia Gardens, described as being between Sayward and Trail, was surveyed. The chosen name aimed to attract buyers to a subdivision selling potential orchards. The existing Sayward settlement was renamed Columbia Gardens, evidenced by the post office name, which opened the next year. However, the train station name did not change until 1913.

The settlement and station are long gone. The Bouma dairy farm, which absorbed the townsite in the 1920s, now only grows hay.

Columbia Gardens currently refers to the general area between Waneta and Montrose, and includes an airport, industrial park, and winery. It is the most northerly point still served by the railway freight line.

== See also ==
- List of ghost towns in British Columbia
