= Malo, Washington =

Unincorporated community in Washington, United States

- Unincorporated community
- Location within Washington (state) Location within the United States
- Coordinates: 48°48′06″N 118°36′25″W
- Country: United States
- State: Washington
- County: Ferry

Area
  - Total: 0.12 sq mi (0.31 km^{2})
  - Land: 0.12 sq mi (0.31 km^{2})
- Elevation: 2,182 ft (665 m)

Population (2020)
  - Total: 32
  - Density: 251/sq mi (97/km^{2})
- Time zone: UTC-8 (Pacific (PST))
  - Summer (DST): UTC-7 (PDT)
- ZIP code: 99150
- Area code: 509
- GNIS feature ID: 1522664

Malo is a census designated place in Ferry County, Washington, United States. As of the 2020 census, Malo had a population of 32.

Malo has a post office with ZIP code 99150.

== Demographics ==
Historical population
Census	Pop.	Note	%±
2010	28		—
2020	32		14.3%
U.S. Decennial Census; 2000 2010

Malo first appeared as a census designated place in the 2010 U.S. census.

=== Racial and ethnic composition ===
Malo CDP, Washington – Racial and ethnic composition Note: the US Census treats Hispanic/Latino as an ethnic category. This table excludes Latinos from the racial categories and assigns them to a separate category. Hispanics/Latinos may be of any race.
Race / Ethnicity (NH = Non-Hispanic)	Pop 2010	Pop 2020	% 2010	% 2020
White alone (NH)	22	25	78.57%	78.13%
Black or African American alone (NH)	0	0	0.00%	0.00%
Native American or Alaska Native alone (NH)	0	0	0.00%	0.00%
Asian alone (NH)	0	0	0.00%	0.00%
Native Hawaiian or Pacific Islander alone (NH)	0	0	0.00%	0.00%
Other race alone (NH)	0	0	0.00%	0.00%
Mixed race or Multiracial (NH)	3	3	10.71%	9.38%
Hispanic or Latino (any race)	3	4	10.71%	12.50%
Total	28	32	100.00%	100.00%

=== 2020 census ===
There were 32 people, 15 housing units, and 12 families living in the CDP. There were 26 White people, and 6 people from two or more races. 4 people had Hispanic or Latino origin.

The median age was 68.5 years old. 69.2% of the population were older than 65. 30.8% of the population were veterans. Poverty levels were declared as zero percent of the population and the median income was not recorded.

=== 2018 estimates ===
The city of Malo had an estimated 28 people in 10 households, in which six were family households. Average household size was 2.5, and an average family size of three. The population density was 242 inhabitants per square mile (93/km^{2}). There were 18 housing units, with a median house value of $125,000. The median age of these units was 73 years. The median age was 58.2. 2.6% of people were registered Democrats, and 97.9% of people were registered Republicans. 26.55% of people were religious, and the median household income was $45,079.
