= Danville, Washington =

- Census-designated place
- Location within Washington (state) Location within the United States
- Coordinates: 48°59′48″N 118°30′09″W
- Country: United States
- State: Washington
- County: Ferry

Area
  - Total: 0.18 sq mi (0.46 km^{2})
  - Land: 0.18 sq mi (0.46 km^{2})
  - Water: 0 sq mi (0.0 km^{2})
- Elevation: 1,749 ft (533 m)

Population (2010)
  - Total: 34
  - Density: 191/sq mi (73.8/km^{2})
- Time zone: UTC-8 (Pacific (PST))
  - Summer (DST): UTC-7 (PDT)
- ZIP code: 99121
- Area code: 509
- GNIS feature ID: 2631349
- FIPS code: 53-16585

Danville is an unincorporated community and census-designated place (CDP) in Ferry County, Washington, United States. As of the 2020 census, Danville had a population of 51. Danville is located on Washington State Route 21 near the Canada–United States border, 31 miles (50 km) north-northeast of Republic, the Ferry County seat.

== Name origin ==
The former name of Nelson came from merchants Peter Bertelsen Nelson and his uncle Ole Nelson. Allegedly established in 1889, the earliest known reference to the settlement name is 1896. The next year, Narcis Peone challenged W.M. Clark over the townsite ownership, but lost the case. The earliest mention of the renamed community to Danville was in January 1899; the renaming was prompted to prevent confusion with Nelson, British Columbia. Daniel (Dan) Montgomery Drumheller, an early promoter of the town, also gave his name to Drumheller Springs, having served as mayor of Spokane. Another theory, indicated by some early maps, placed Danville as an adjacent community, named for the Danville Mining Co. A further theory suggests another Nelson townsite was laid out in 1902, but its location is unclear.

== History ==
=== Early community ===
Although the Nelsons are considered the pioneer merchants, the claim of operating the first store at the locality is unsubstantiated. Apparently, in the early 1890s, Dennis Peone ran a store from his home, which also provided accommodation for passing visitors. Some individuals envious of the family's farming success resorted to arson. The post office opened around 1896, storekeeper P.B. Nelson being the inaugural postmaster. By that winter, businesses included the William Clark butcher shop, Woodward & Bellow saloon, and Downs hotel.

In 1897, the townsite was laid out, and J.Y. Jaskulek opened a general store with a jewelry and watch repair section. McCarter and Hull published the Reservation Record newspaper 1897–1898, lasting less than a year, before relocating to Eureka camps (Republic). Around 1898, John Sucksmith opened a sawmill, but died in a boating accident about four years later. E.A. Garner, who bought the mill, died of heart attack in 1904.

In 1900, fire destroyed Peter Nelson's store. Rebuilding, he experienced serious financial problems a few years later. In 1905, a new syndicate bought the mill, which produced 30,000 feet (9,144 meters) of lumber daily. Retail relocations the next year were J. Jaskulek to Spokane, and P.B. Nelson to two doors from the post office store, which John H. Grunwell had acquired. J. Bell & Co appears to have bought the Jaskulek store. Arson was suspected in the 1907 fire that destroyed Wm. Sands' blacksmith shop.

About 1911, Danville Lumber & Milling opened a general store. By 1913, the mill, which produced 50,000 feet (15,240 meters) of lumber daily, was one of the three larger producers in the area.

=== Prohibition and the aftermath ===
In the 1920s, increased prosperity returned to Danville with Prohibition. Danville became a rendezvous for whiskey smugglers, who employed local guides familiar with the old trails to avoid detection by border authorities. When Prohibition ended, Danville entered a decline. A series of fires also took their toll. Old Man Jennings, the justice of the peace, was rumored to have counterfeited half dollars.

=== Later community ===
In 1990, immediately north of Danville, a fuel, food, and lodging complex was built, comprising 10 motel units, a restaurant, convenience store, and gas station. Like most smaller border communities, 90 per cent of the trade has been from visiting Canadians traditionally. In 2021, the enterprise was listed for sale. It reopened under new ownership in 2022.

As of 2023, a post office exists in Danville proper. Danville Hall, a volunteer fire department, is a satellite station of Ferry-Okanogan County Fire Protection District 14.

== Demographics ==
Historical population
Census	Pop.	Note	%±
2010	34		—
2020	51		50.0%
U.S. Decennial Census; 2000 2010

Danville first appeared as a census designated place in the 2010 U.S. census.

=== Racial and ethnic composition ===
Danville CDP, Washington – Racial and ethnic composition Note: the US Census treats Hispanic/Latino as an ethnic category. This table excludes Latinos from the racial categories and assigns them to a separate category. Hispanics/Latinos may be of any race.
Race / Ethnicity (NH = Non-Hispanic)	Pop 2010	Pop 2020	% 2010	% 2020
White alone (NH)	32	35	94.12%	68.63%
Black or African American alone (NH)	0	0	0.00%	0.00%
Native American or Alaska Native alone (NH)	0	7	0.00%	13.73%
Asian alone (NH)	0	0	0.00%	0.00%
Native Hawaiian or Pacific Islander alone (NH)	0	1	0.00%	1.96%
Other race alone (NH)	0	0	0.00%	0.00%
Mixed race or Multiracial (NH)	2	6	5.88%	11.76%
Hispanic or Latino (any race)	0	2	0.00%	3.92%
Total	34	51	100.00%	100.00%

=== 2010 census ===
The population at the 2010 census was 34.

== Infrastructure history ==
=== Passenger transit and border crossing ===
The community, which lies about 0.6 miles (1.0 km) south of the boundary, was served by two railroads.

=== Roads, bridges, and waterways ===
After upgrades to the Midway–Curlew road were completed in 1897, work began on the Curlew–Nelson (Danville) section. The Kettle Falls–Eureka camp (Republic) road was also built, providing a shorter route to Nelson. However, the poor springtime road conditions made more circuitous freighting by river the only option.

In 1902, residents petitioned the Ferry County commissioners to build a wagon bridge across the river to access the train station. In 1910, this structure was replaced by a steel bridge. The railway has been removed and is now a trail.

== Mining ==
The Alabama group, a local copper/gold mine, was owned by the Lucille Dreyfus Mining Co. In 1902, a syndicate led by Col. William Ridpath acquired and developed the claim. In 1903, shipments to the Granby smelter began, and the company filed a suit to cancel 982,000 fraudulent share certificates. The next year, the company went into receivership but resumed operations months later. Idle since 1910, the mine was acquired by Arthur Dunphy in 1916. In 1919, the Chatterboy Mining Co. acquired the inactive property and resumed operations. Prior to permanent closure in 1921, the Lucille Dreyfus was the largest producer in the vicinity. This grouping of mines operated as the Morning Star from the mid-1930s to the mid-1940s.

== Folklore ==
While John Falconer was prospecting in the area during the summer of 1912, an electrical storm ignited a tree on a hillside to the southeast of town. On riding toward the distant fire, his horse stumbled upon a rock in the middle of the trail. At the distant point, the rain had extinguished the fire. On his return home, he pocketed the earlier rock, which he assumed was merely pyrites. Months later, Falconer realized the rock was primarily gold ore, then worth over $1,000. Danville old timers called the find "the golden plate", which was believed to indicate a gold ledge. Falconer and his wife searched, but were unable to rediscover the original location. Though many have tried, the elusive deposit has never been found.
