= Westbridge =

Westbridge can refer to:

- Westbridge, British Columbia, a community in Regional District of Kootenay Boundary, Canada
- Westbridge, Massachusetts, a fictional town in Sabrina, the Teenage Witch (1996 TV series)
- Westbridge (LIRR station), a former railroad station in New York, United States
- Westbridge Technology, a former technology company now part of Progress Software
- PAREF Westbridge School, a private school for boys in Iloilo City, Philippines

== See also ==
- West Bridge, technology in embedded computer architecture
- USS West Bridge (ID-2888), a cargo ship of the United States Navy during World War I
