= Rock Creek Canyon Bridge =

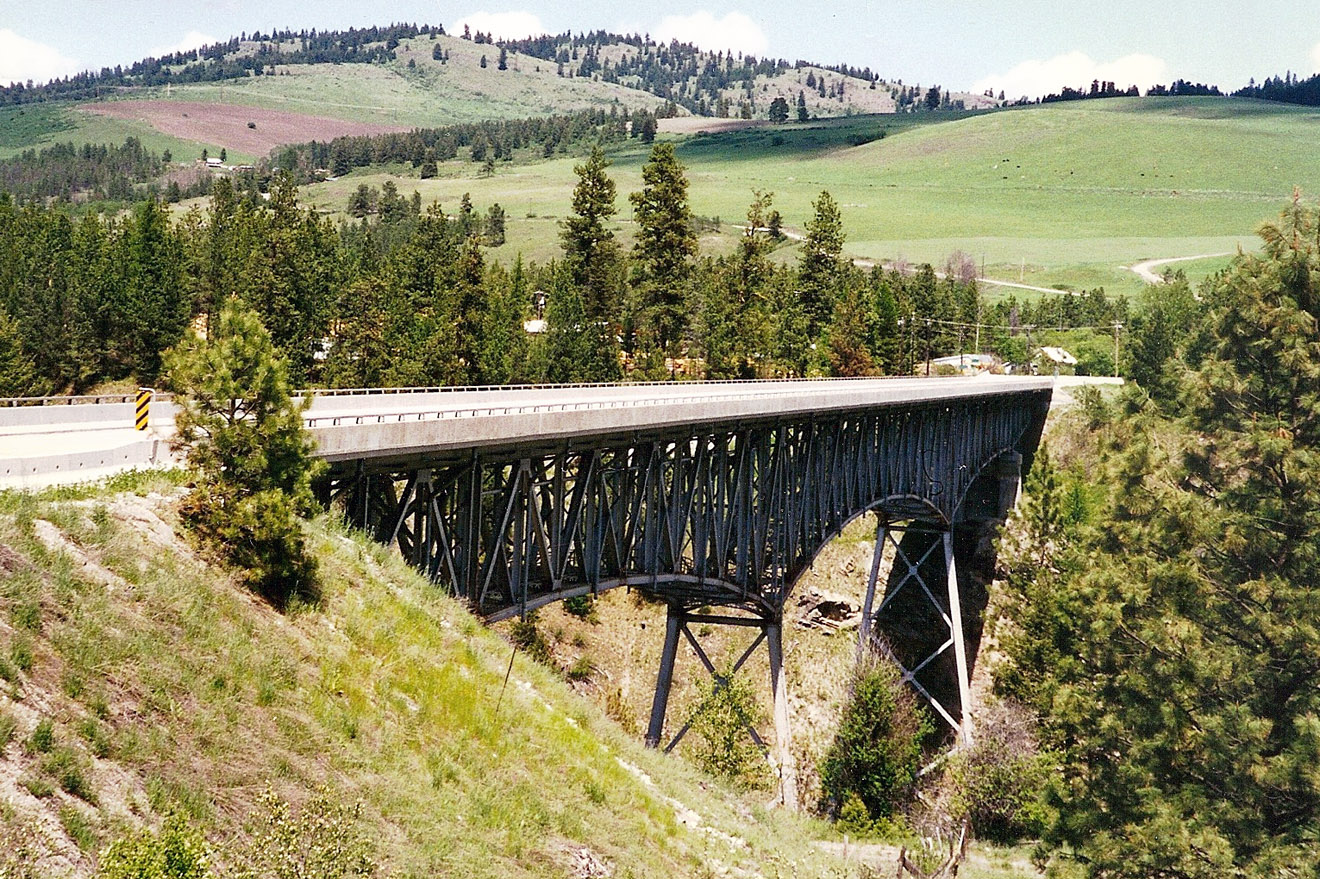
- Coordinates: 49°02′56″N 119°07′04″W
- Carries: Vehicular traffic
- Crosses: Rock Creek
- Locale: Between Osoyoos & Rock Creek
- Maintained by: Province of British Columbia

Characteristics
- Design: Deck truss bridge
- Material: Steel
- Total length: 286 metres (938 ft)
- Width: 10 metres (33 ft)
- Height: 91 metres (299 ft)
- No. of spans: 3

History
- Construction end: 1951 (altered and widened in 1992)

Location
- Interactive map of Rock Creek Canyon Bridge

The Rock Creek Canyon Bridge is a large, multi-span, steel truss bridge on the Crowsnest Highway over Rock Creek Canyon in British Columbia. Originally built in 1951, the structure was widened and strengthened in 1992. Carrying two lanes of vehicular traffic, the bridge is 286 metres long and stands 91 metres above Rock Creek.

== Location ==
Situated about halfway between Osoyoos & Rock Creek, it crosses Rock Creek between its confluence with two of its tributaries, McKinney Creek and Baker Creek. At the west end of the bridge is the start of the road to the Mount Baldy Ski Area.

== Alterations ==
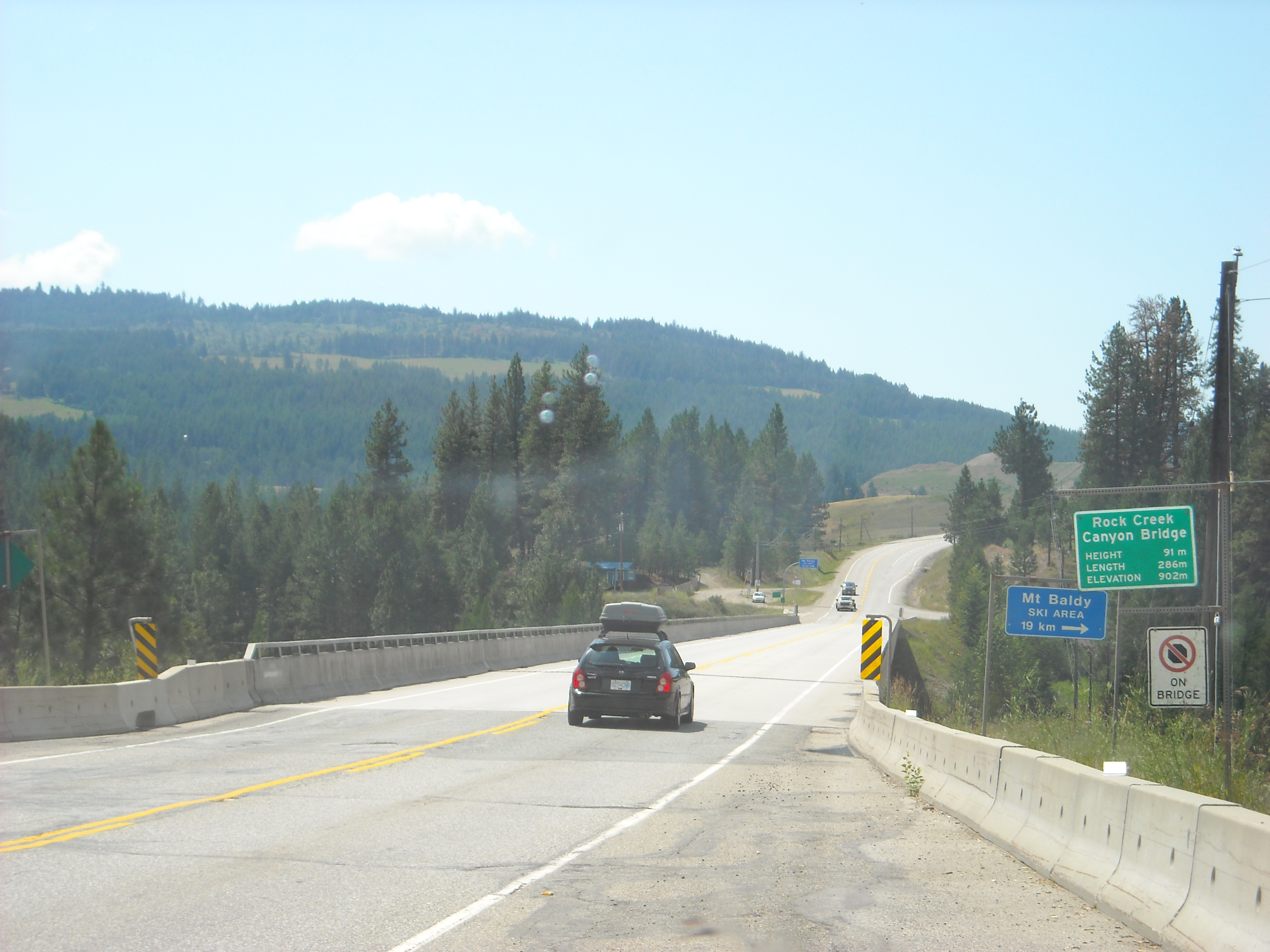
A look across the bridge from its east end.

The original stringer-supported bridge was constructed in 1951. It was designed to comply with the HS20 design codes released by the American Association of State Highway and Transportation Officials, which were current at the time.

In the early 1990s, the government of British Columbia, responsible for the upkeep of Rock Creek Canyon Bridge, reviewed it and decided that the structure was not wide enough to cope with modern traffic. Instead of replacing the bridge altogether, significant alterations to the bridge were made in 1992, a much less expensive option. The capacity of the structure was increased to comply with more rigorous and up-to-date design codes. The deck was widened, from 7.3 metres (24 ft) to 10 metres (33 ft), and was made of composite steel and concrete. Additionally, some seismic improvements were undertaken and the bridge was repainted. These works were designed and supervised by Buckland and Taylor Ltd, a bridge engineering firm, and the project was delivered on time and under budget. The construction works were phased, keeping one lane open at all times to minimise the traffic disruption that a full closure would cause.
