= Westbridge, British Columbia =

Westbridge
- Locality
- Location of Westbridge in British Columbia
- Coordinates: 49°09′59″N 118°58′04″W
- Country: Canada
- Province: British Columbia
- Region: Boundary Country
- Regional district: Kootenay Boundary
- Time zone: UTC−07:00 (PT)
- Area codes: 250, 778, 236, & 672
- Highways: Highway 33

Westbridge is in the Boundary Country region of south central British Columbia. The place straddles the West Kettle River immediately north of the confluence with the Kettle River. On BC Highway 33, the locality is by road about 87 kilometres (54 mi) northwest of Grand Forks, 64 kilometres (40 mi) northeast of Osoyoos, and 121 kilometres (75 mi) south of Kelowna.

== Topography ==
Northward on the Christian Valley Rd, the valley alternates between an 800-metre (0.5 mi) width and narrow canyons. Southward, the valley is 1.2 to 1.6 kilometres (0.7 to 1.0 mi) wide and the benches become more frequent and larger.

== Ferry, bridges, and name origin ==
In mid-1897, a free ferry was installed at the west fork and operated until winter. In 1898, the plans for a ferry were replaced by an aerial basket completed in the spring. After a change of mind, the flimsy conventional ferry installed was dangerous in the strong current.

In 1899, upgrades were made after sidelining the unsafe ferry, being damaged by high water, or being carried over a mile downriver and piling up. At low water, the river could be forded in the vicinity.

Formerly known as West Fork, the new name (first appearing in a December 1899 newspaper) likely alluded to the plodding bridge construction. In spring 1900, the nearly completed bridge floated away. Replaced in the fall, the final product was considered unsatisfactory.

In 1921–22, one span of the bridge was renewed.

In 1953–54, the bridge was redecked. In 1955–56, the remaining 8 kilometres (5 mi) of highway from Rock Creek were widened, gravelled, and paved.

In 1977–78, Kenyon Construction was awarded the bridge replacement contract, which realigned the highway southeastward. In 1980–81, Hitec Steel Construction and Engineering was awarded the addition of a sidewalk to the structure.

== Earlier community ==
The two small villages of Bridgeport and Westbridge existed at the river mouth in late 1899. The former was never mentioned again. The latter comprised a few log cabins, a general store, and a log hotel. The post office opened in 1900. About 800 metres (0.5 mi) above the bridge, the hamlet had enlarged by 1901 into a dozen houses, a hotel, store/post office, blacksmith, and Deputy Mining Recorder office. The next year, the mining office closed.

In 1907, the place was described as half town, half mining camp, and central to the lumber industry. The following year, the hotel was enlarged.

In 1921, the first school opened about 1.6 kilometres (1 mi) up the west fork. Later, the second one opened about 400 metres (437 yd) up the main river but was then moved to about 6 kilometres (4 mi) up, before closing in 1932–33. A few years after reopening, the second school merged with the first in a new facility built in Westbridge in the mid-1940s. However, two schools existed briefly in the early 1950s.

Although the hotel did not operate beyond the mid-1940s, the building was still standing decades later.

In 1957, fire destroyed one of the sawmills. The next year, the new Westbridge park opened. In 1959, the community received telephone service.

In 1961, BC Hydro transmission lines introduced electricity to the locality, and a new school building was erected. In 1967, the new community hall replaced the former hall, which had been originally built in 1927 as a residence.

In 1985, the general store was for sale.

In the mid-1990s, the school closed.

Near the north end of the bridge, the hotel was long demolished, but the abandoned store remained until destroyed by fire in 2005.

== Railway ==
The westward advance of the Kettle Valley Railway (KV) rail head passed by Westbridge in spring 1911 and Rhone in fall.

By early 1913, the station was erected and construction trains were running beyond Carmi.

The Canadian Pacific Railway (CP) motive is unclear for the establishment of the Zamora station in close proximity.

In 1906, CP sold 10,000 hectares (25,000 acres) of timber land in the vicinity.

The final passenger train passed through the station in 1964 and freight train in 1979, when the Penticton–Rock Creek leg was abandoned.

Train Timetables (Regular stop or Flag stop)
	Mile	1915	1916	1919	1924	1929	1932	1935	1939	1943	1948	1954	1960	1963
Carmi	46.6	Regular	Regular	Both	Both	Regular	Regular	Regular	Regular	Regular	Regular	Both	Flag	
Beaverdell	42.3	Regular	Flag	Flag	Flag	Regular	Regular	Regular	Regular	Regular	Regular	Regular	Regular	
Taurus	31.4	Regular	Flag	Flag	Flag	Flag	Flag	Flag	Flag	Flag	Flag	Flag	Flag	
Rhone	24.8	Regular	Flag	Flag	Flag	Flag	Flag	Flag	Flag	Flag	Flag	Flag	Flag	
Westbridge	20.5	Regular	Flag	Flag	Flag	Flag	Flag	Flag	Flag	Flag	Regular	Both	Regular	
Zamora	18.9	Regular	Flag	Flag	Flag	Flag	Flag	Flag	Flag	Flag	Flag	Flag	Flag	
Rock Creek	11.7	Regular	Regular	Regular	Regular	Regular	Both	Regular	Regular	Regular	Regular	Regular	Flag	
Kettle Valley	8.8		Flag	Flag	Flag		Flag	Flag	Flag	Flag	Regular	Both	Flag	
West Midway	1.1	Regular	Flag	Flag	Flag									
Midway	0.0	Regular	Regular	Regular	Regular	Regular	Regular	Regular	Regular	Regular	Regular	Regular	Regular	Regular

The former station site lies on the Kettle Valley Rail Trail. Immediately southeast of the highway are the footings of the former section house. The highway relocation removed evidence of the former water tower.

== Roads ==
In 1899, a wagon road northward from Rock Creek was built at great expense. The road continued 5 kilometres (3 mi) up the West Kettle.

In 1902, the wagon road appears to have advanced, because the stage route from Midway was extended to Beaverdell. These roads appear to have deteriorated over the following years, because by 1904, a good wagon road existed only a few miles northward from Rock Creek. The next year, the whole road was upgraded to Carmi, providing an all-weather route.

In 1900, the promoters of the former Canyon City (which never took root) built a 34-kilometre (21 mi) wagon road north up the Kettle River from Westbridge. Despite the absence of a producing mine or settlements, the government provided a $4,500 subsidy.

In the late 1910s, this rudimentary road was extended about 14 kilometres (9 mi) upriver to Christian Valley. That name derived from the school, opened in 1916, which honoured Joseph and Alice Christian.

== Later community ==
Scenes from Mindless Love (TV movie 2005) were shot in Westbridge.

In 2011, the post office closed.

A thrift store operates from the community centre. A Seventh-day Adventist Church holds services. A seasonal coffee shop caters to the rail trail.

Popular in summer is tubing the river the 7 kilometres (4 mi) from the bridge to the Kettle River Recreation Area.

== Rhone ==
The Saunier family, who settled around 1909, chose the place name of this former railway siding, which was first mentioned in June 1915.

In 1964, an 18-year-old former Rhone student received a university degree.

At this rest stop on the rail trail, long-time resident Paul Lautard has built a shelter, picnic tables, war memorial, and outhouse.

== Taurus ==
Originally called Bull Creek, a seasonal hotel operated from 1901. While he was proprietor, Gorman West upgraded the hunting and fishing resort in 1905.

During this era, the locality was also known as Gorman West. He remained proprietor until 1912. To avoid confusion with the station at Bull River, CP renamed the stop as Taurus (Latin for bull), which was first mentioned in June 1915. In 1930, the creek was officially renamed as Taurus Creek.

== Maps ==
- "Rand McNally BC map". www.davidrumsey.com. 1925.
- "Standard Oil BC map". www.davidrumsey.com. 1937.
- "Shell BC map". www.davidrumsey.com. 1956. Archived from the original on October 17, 2022.
