= Carmi, British Columbia =

Carmi
- Location of Carmi in British Columbia
- Coordinates: 49°30′00″N 119°07′00″W
- Country: Canada
- Province: British Columbia

Carmi (/ˈkɑːrmaɪ/ KAR-my) is a hamlet in the Boundary Country region of southern British Columbia. The town is on the west side of the West Kettle River, east of Penticton, on Hwy 33. Carmi emerged as a silver mining camp just after the turn of the 20th century, named after the nearby mine owned by James C. Dale from Carmi, Illinois.

By 1910, Carmi comprised crude log cabins and a hotel owned by "Trapper" Smith. When the mine closed, the town mostly disappeared after three decades of existence. Passenger train service ceased in the early 1960s. The abandoned Smith House hotel burnt to the ground in 2000.

Although comprising a few residences, most of the old cabins have disappeared with time.

Train Timetables (Regular stop or Flag stop)
Year	1918	1929	1935	1943	1948	1954	1955	1961
Ref.								
Type	Regular	Regular	Regular	Regular	Regular	Reg/Flag	Reg/Flag	Flag
