= Johnstone Creek Provincial Park =

Provincial park in British Columbia

- IUCN category II (national park)
- Location within British Columbia
- Interactive map of Johnstone Creek Provincial Park
- Location: Similkameen Land District, British Columbia, Canada
- Nearest city: Rock Creek, BC
- Coordinates: 49°02′50″N 119°02′56″W
- Area: 38 ha (94 acres)
- Established: March 16, 1956
- Governing body: BC Parks

Johnstone Creek Provincial Park is a provincial park in British Columbia, Canada, located west of the confluence of Rock Creek and the Kettle River and the town of Rock Creek. The park has a roughly 38 hectare area, and is near to the Crowsnest Highway.
