= Zamora, British Columbia =

Zamora
- Location of Zamora in British Columbia
- Coordinates: 49°08′59″N 118°59′04″W
- Country: Canada
- Province: British Columbia
- Region: Boundary Country
- Regional District: Kootenay Boundary
- Time zone: UTC−07:00 (PT)
- Area codes: 250, 778, 236, & 672
- Highways: Highway 33

Zamora is on the west side of the Kettle River in the Boundary region of south central British Columbia. The rural settlement, on BC Highway 33, is by road about 12 kilometres (7 mi) north of Rock Creek and 124 kilometres (77 mi) southeast of Kelowna.

== Name origin ==
Why the Kettle Valley Railway, a Canadian Pacific Railway (CP) subsidiary, opened this station so close to Westbridge is unclear. Nobody appears to have lived in the vicinity until the late 1920s. In 1915, the station name changed from Zamaro to Zamora. The latter might be named after Zamora, Spain or the Spanish Province of Zamora, but no evidence substantiates either of these claims. Zamaro is more common as a surname than first name. CP sometimes named new stations after employees or their family members, but the early name change likely suggests the initial spelling was a mistake.

== Railway ==
The former stop, on the west side of the Kettle River, was 11.6 kilometres (7.2 mi) north of Rock Creek, and 2.6 kilometres (1.6 mi) south of Westbridge. No evidence remains of the section house, which was immediately south of Zamora Rd. Passenger service ended in 1964. This part of the line closed to all traffic in 1973.

CP Train Timetables (Regular stop or Flag stop)
Year	1919	1929	1932	1935	1939	1943	1948	1953	1955	1960	1963
Ref.											
Type	Flag	Flag	Flag	Flag	Flag	Flag	Flag	Flag	Flag	Flag	Flag

Zamora lies on the Kettle Valley Rail Trail.

== Later community ==
Zamora Estates was an upscale bare-land strata development comprising 15 lots. Each of the 0.4-to-0.8-hectare (1-to-2-acre) lots have river frontage. After the 1915 wildfire in the Rock Creek area, only one house remained standing in the Zamora subdivision, the remainder reduced to rubble.

== See also ==
- "1925 BC map". www.davidrumsey.com. showing Westbridge.
- "2016 Google streetview". www.google.ca. showing the fire destruction from the trail.
