= Mjøsa Bridge =

Mjøsa Bridge Mjøsbrua
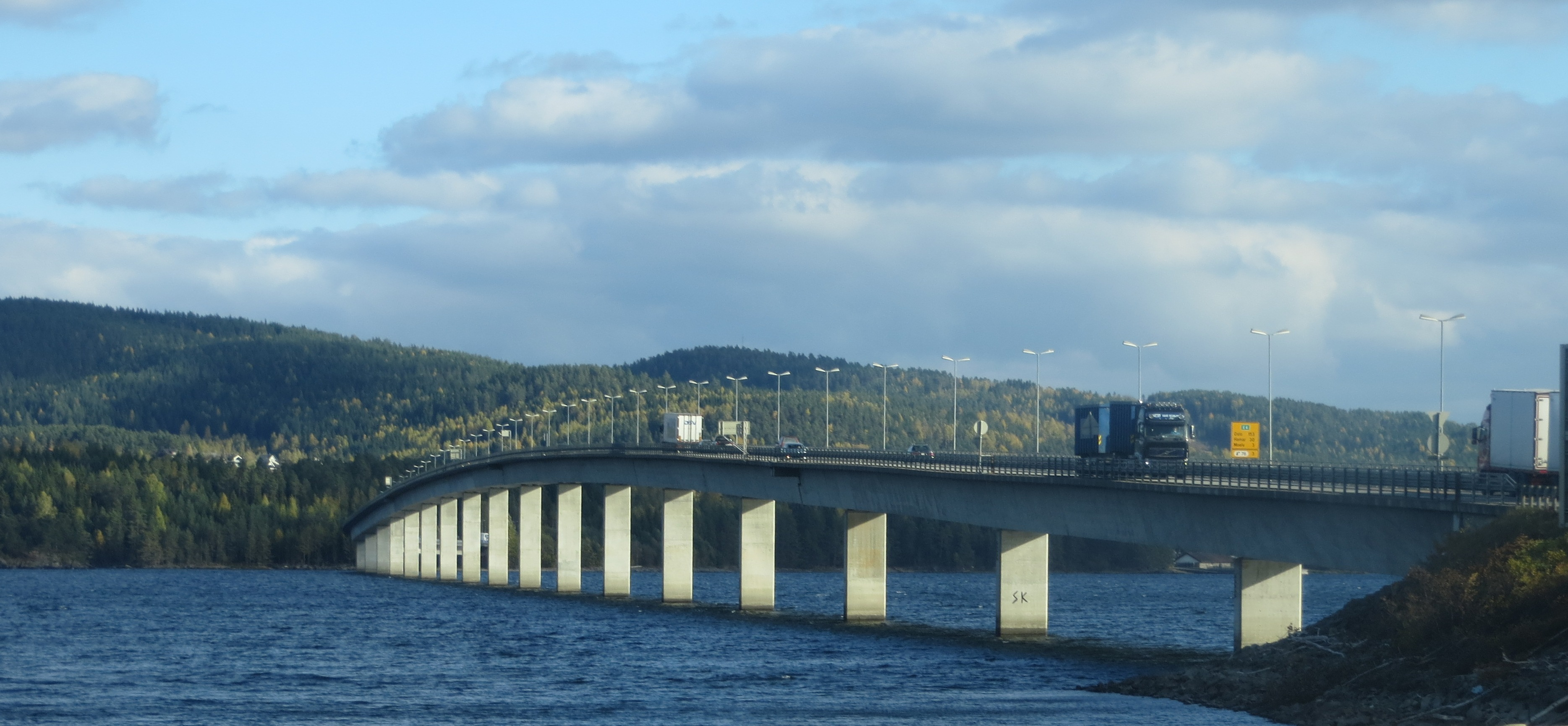
- View of the bridge
- Coordinates: 60°55′42″N 10°39′57″E
- Carries: E6
- Crosses: Mjøsa
- Locale: Ringsaker/Gjøvik

Characteristics
- Design: Box girder bridge
- Material: Prestressed concrete
- Total length: 1,421 metres (4,662 ft)
- Longest span: 69 metres (226 ft)
- No. of spans: 21
- Clearance below: 15 metres (49 ft)

History
- Opened: 1985

Location
- Interactive map of Mjøsa Bridge

The Mjøsa Bridge (Norwegian: Mjøsbrua) is a box girder bridge that crosses Lake Mjøsa in Innlandet county, Norway. The east side of the bridge begins in the town of Moelv in Ringsaker Municipality and the village of Biri in Gjøvik Municipality. The bridge is 1,421 metres (4,662 ft) long, the longest span is 69 metres (226 ft), and the clearance to the water below is 15 metres (49 ft). The bridge has 21 spans and one vehicular lane in each direction. The Mjøsa Bridge was opened in 1985.

The government is currently planning to replace the bridge with a new four-lane bridge over the lake as part of an expansion of the E6 highway around Moelv. Work (or construction) on the (new, wooden) bridge has been paused as of Q3 2022, as a consequence of the 2022 collapse of the Tretten Bridge in Norway.

== See also ==
- List of bridges in Norway
- List of bridges in Norway by length
- List of bridges
- List of bridges by length
