= Engeløy Bridges =

Engeløy Bridges Engeløybruene
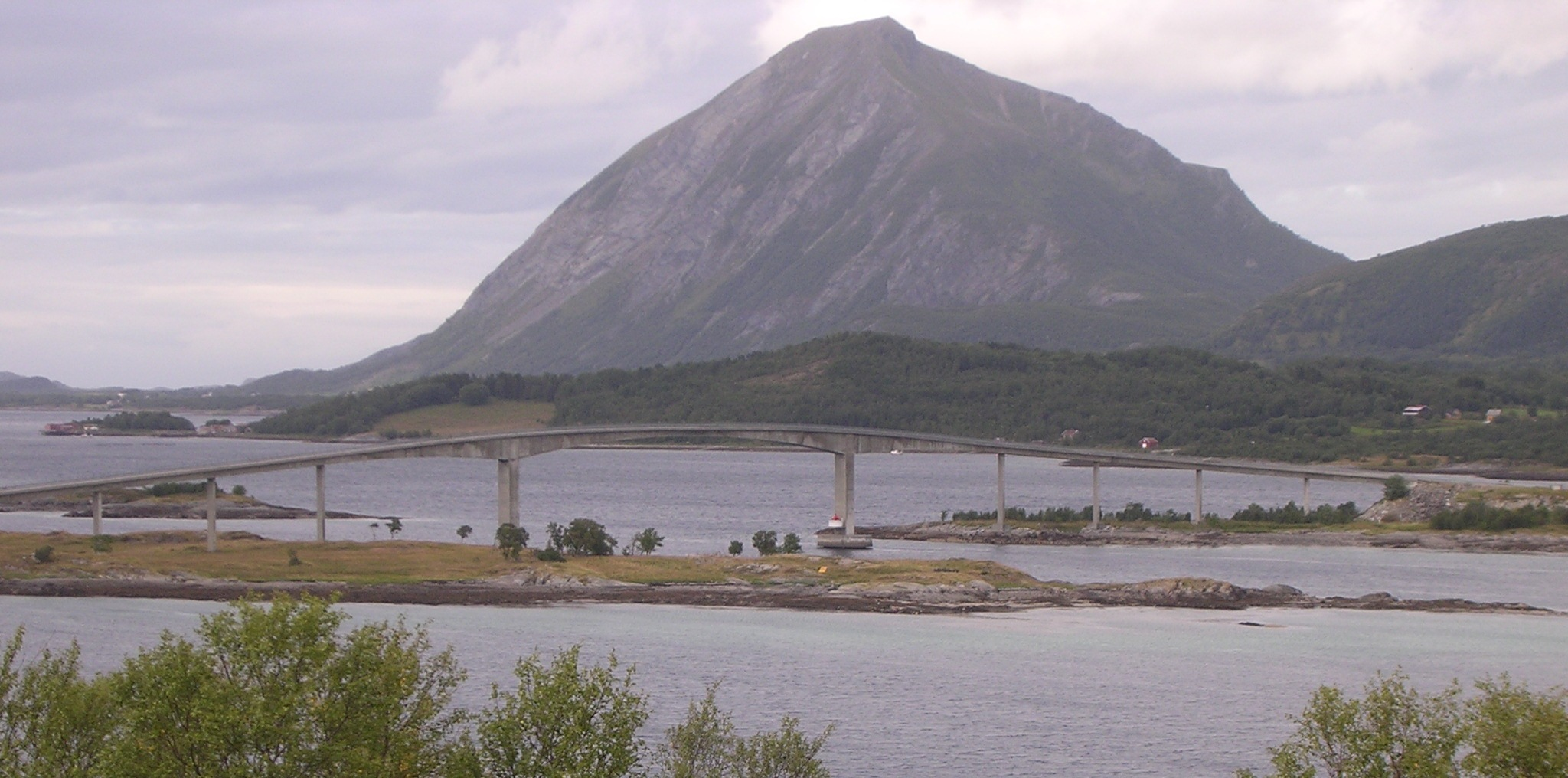
- View of the bridge
- Coordinates: 67.9045°N 15.1811°E
- Carries: Fv835
- Crosses: Bogøysundet
- Locale: Steigen Municipality, Norway

Characteristics
- Design: Cantilever bridge
- Material: Concrete
- Total length: 548 metres (1,798 ft)
- Longest span: 110 metres (360 ft)

The Engeløy Bridges (Norwegian: Engeløybruene) are two bridges in Steigen Municipality in Nordland county, Norway. The bridges were built in 1978 to connect the island of Engeløya to the mainland.

The higher bridge goes from the mainland at the village of Bogen to the small island of Ålstadøya. It is a 548-metre (1,798 ft) long concrete box girder cantilever bridge, with the longest span being 110 metres (360 ft).

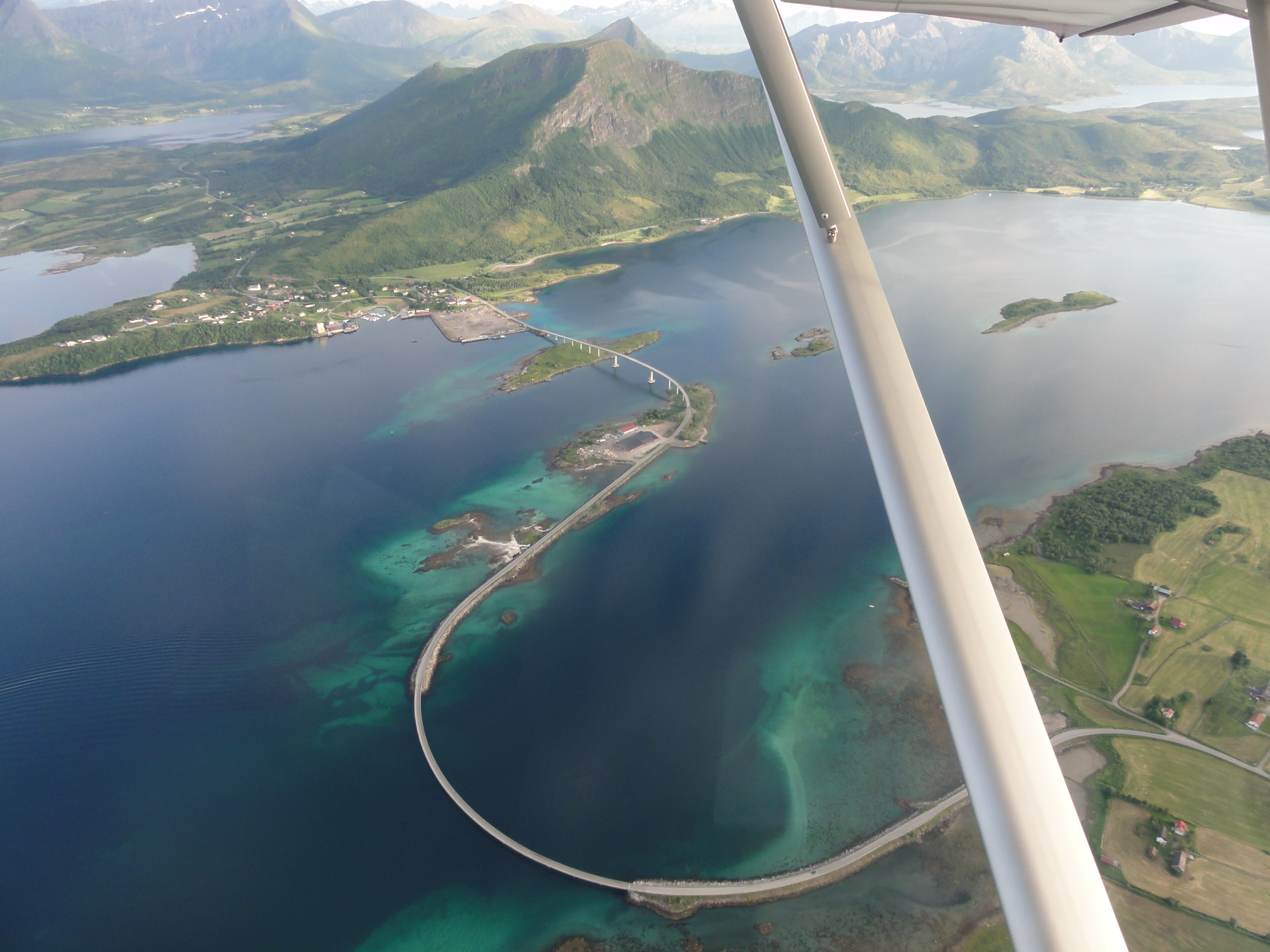
The Engeløy Bridges

The other (lower) bridge curves around from the small island of Ålstadøya to the large island of Engeløya. It is 360 metres (1,180 ft) long, with the longest span being 24 metres (79 ft).

== See also ==
- List of bridges in Norway
- List of bridges in Norway by length
- List of bridges
- List of bridges by length
