= Farrisbrua =

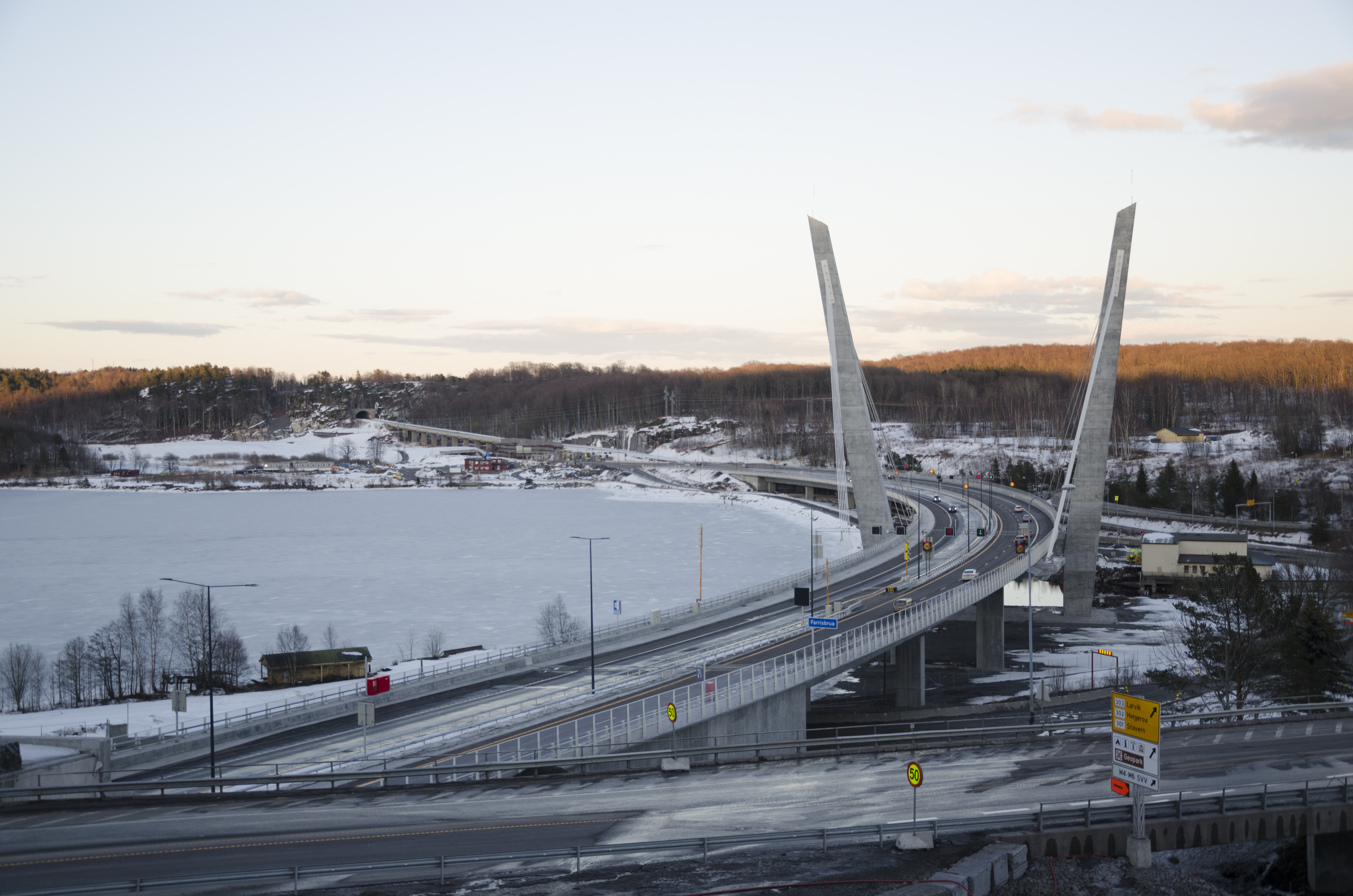
- Photo: Petter Ulleland
- Coordinates: 59.056520°N 10.010844°E
- Carries: Motor vehicles
- Crosses: Farris
- Locale: Larvik Municipality, Norway

Characteristics
- Design: Cable-stayed bridge
- Material: Concrete and steel
- Total length: 570 metres (1,870 ft)
- Width: 28.0 metres (91.9 ft)
- Height: 70 metres (230 ft)
- Longest span: 28 metres (92 ft)

History
- Construction start: 2013
- Construction end: Expected January 2018
- Opened: March 2018

Location
- Interactive map of Farrisbrua

The Farrisbrua (English: Farris Bridge) is a major road bridge crossing the lake Farris in Larvik Municipality in Vestfold county, Norway. The bridge lies just north of the town of Larvik. It is part of the expansion of the E18 motorway from the antiquated single carriageway to modern dual carriageway standards, enabling increased speeds and traffic volumes between the eastern and southern parts of the country. It was built between 2013 and 2018, to a cost of 718 million NOK (excl. VAT).

== Dimensions and structure ==
Farrisbrua is 570 metres (1,870 ft) in length and 28 metres (92 ft) wide. It goes in a horizontal curve around the southern bank of the Farris water. Mainly built in concrete, the 120 meter middle section is a cable-stayed bridge in steel with concrete towers 70 metres (230 ft) tall. The bridge also has a slight incline from the east to the west, up to the tunnel in Martineåsen.

The bridge's largest foundation is that of the tower. This foundation is made of 12 steel pillars measuring 2 metres (6 ft 7 in) in diameter, filled with armour and concrete. The pillars are drilled through the moraine masses down to bedrock, which is around 80 metres (260 ft) below the surface. On top of these pillars lies a concrete plate that is 4 metres (13 ft) thick and covers 1,000 square metres (11,000 sq ft). There are also 9 smaller foundations that vary in size.

== Construction ==
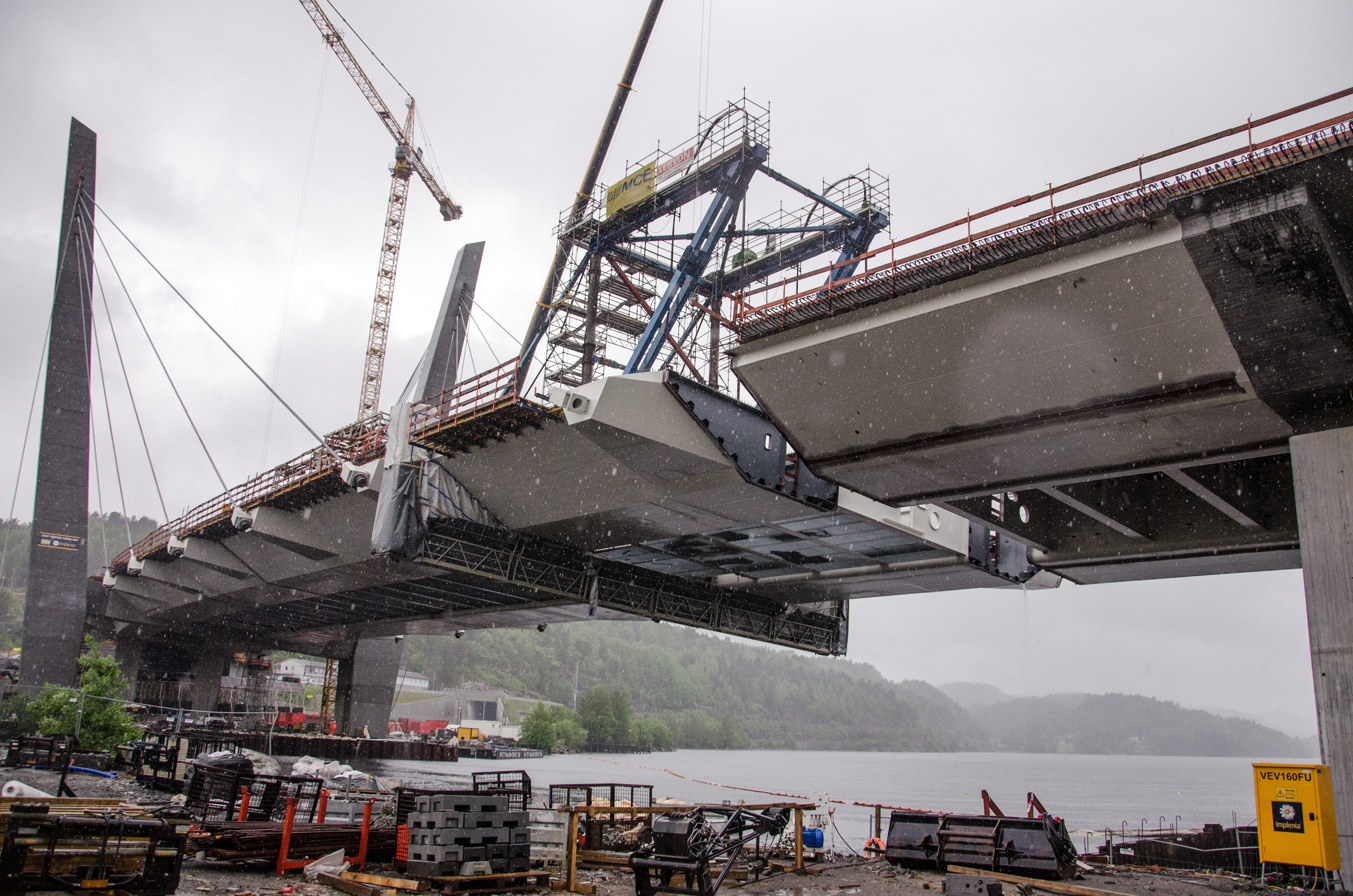
The Farris bridge under construction on 7 June 2017

The expansion of the motorway from Oslo to Kristiansand (and then onwards to Stavanger) was proposed many decades ago, but due to the slow political process, the actual construction is still ongoing. The construction of the Farris bridge was finally agreed upon as part of the building of a 7-kilometre (4.3 mi) stretch of motorway between Bommestad and Sky. Building started in 2013 and completion scheduled for New Year 2018. After a three-month post-ponement, the bridge finally opened in March 2018.

The bridge was built by Joint Venture Farris Bru ANS. Initially, it was Polish Bilfinger Infrastructure (65%) and German Bilfinger Constructions (35%) who formed this joint venture and obtained the contract. The two companies were bought by Austrian PORR and Swiss Implenia in 2015, which continued the work from there.

== Literature ==
- Norwegian Public Roads Administration: Project page.

== See also ==
- List of bridges in Norway by length
