= Mount Baldy Ski Area =

Ski resort in British Columbia, Canada

Mt. Baldy Ski Area
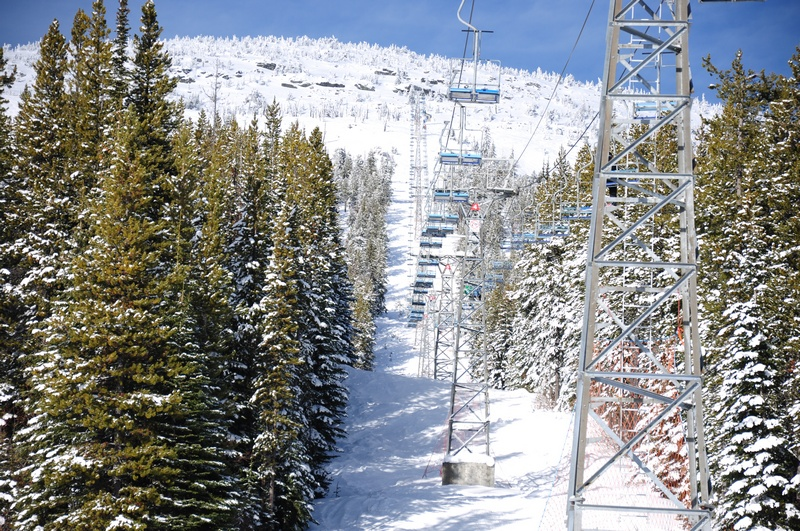
- Interactive map of Mt. Baldy Ski Area
- Location: British Columbia, Canada
- Nearest city: Oliver
- Coordinates: 49°9′14″N 119°14′22″W
- Vertical: 394 m (1,293 ft)
- Top elevation: 2123 m (6,965 ft) + 180 m skiable peak
- Base elevation: 1726 m (5700 ft)
- Skiable area: 600 acres (240 ha)
- Trails: 22 total 23% beginner 41% intermediate 36% expert
- Longest run: 3.25 km (2 mi) Baldy Trail
- Lift system: 4 total 1 double chairlift 1 Magic Carpet; 1 quad lift 1 T-bar lift
- Snowfall: 256 in (6,500 mm)
- Website: baldyresort.com

Baldy Mountain Resort is a family friendly ski resort overlooking the Okanagan Valley in southern British Columbia just north of the Washington state border. Its road access is via McKinney Road from Oliver and from BC Highway 33 north of Bridesville and BC Highway 3 west of Rock Creek, in the Boundary Country. Air access from Penticton Regional Airport (Air Canada from Vancouver, WestJet from Calgary). The summit is in the Okanagan Highland, an intermediary plateau-like area between the Monashee Mountains to the east and the Okanagan Valley immediately below to the west.

In 1968, its first season, Mt. Baldy Ski Area operated as a ski cat area with McKinney T-Bar that has not operated in years although it’s advertised as a lift at the resort. A year later, the resort acquired a Poma T-bar that traveled up the face of Mount Baldy. The T-bar base at 5650 ft above sea level; the highest in British Columbia. The Poma T-bar was replaced with the former Blue Chair (double Mueller lift) from Mount Washington on Vancouver Island. This lift is now called the Eagle Chair.

Sugarlump lift was installed in 2007. The Sugarlump lift is a Leitner Poma fixed-grip quad chair lift. Total uphill capacity is 750 persons per hour. Baldy Mountain Resort consists of 35 downhill skiing trails. In 2012 a trail was cut leading from Sugarlump to the McKinney area to access the terrain park. Nordic trails are also open December through March although not groomed.

The hill is unique as the associated village of 150 ski cottages are ski-in ski-out, although the strata is not associated with the ski hill.

There is a ski school, day-lodge and lounge, ski equipment rentals and snow shoe rentals are available in the Snow Sports Centre.

The ski hill did not open for the 2013–14 season due to financial difficulties.

In July 2014, the Supreme Court of British Columbia granted conduct of sale in a foreclosure action to a secured creditor of Mount Baldy. In the foreclosure, G-Force Real Estate Inc. of Vancouver, B.C. has been appointed as Marketing Agent to sell most of the assets of Mount Baldy Ski Corporation and related companies. Mount Baldy did operate during the 2014–15 season, opening middle of January 2015 with just the Sugarlump lift operating along with the magic carpet. Food and liquor service was offered in the lodge.

New ownership took over in 2016 with rebranding the ski area to Baldy Mountain Resort in an attempt to differentiate itself from other ski areas named Mt. Baldy and opened the ski hill successfully for 2016–17 season. Baldy Mountain Resort is still in operation under the new ownership with plans to update the infrastructure in the near future. Over the 2024–25 winter season, Baldy Mountain Resort saw a record number of seasonal skier visits totaling 32,000 visits. That same season, Baldy Mountain Resort operated for their longest season on record, opening for skiing November 29, 2024, and closing on April 20, 2025.

== See also ==
- List of ski areas and resorts in Canada
