= Rock Creek, British Columbia =

Unincorporated settlement in British Columbia, Canada

Rock Creek
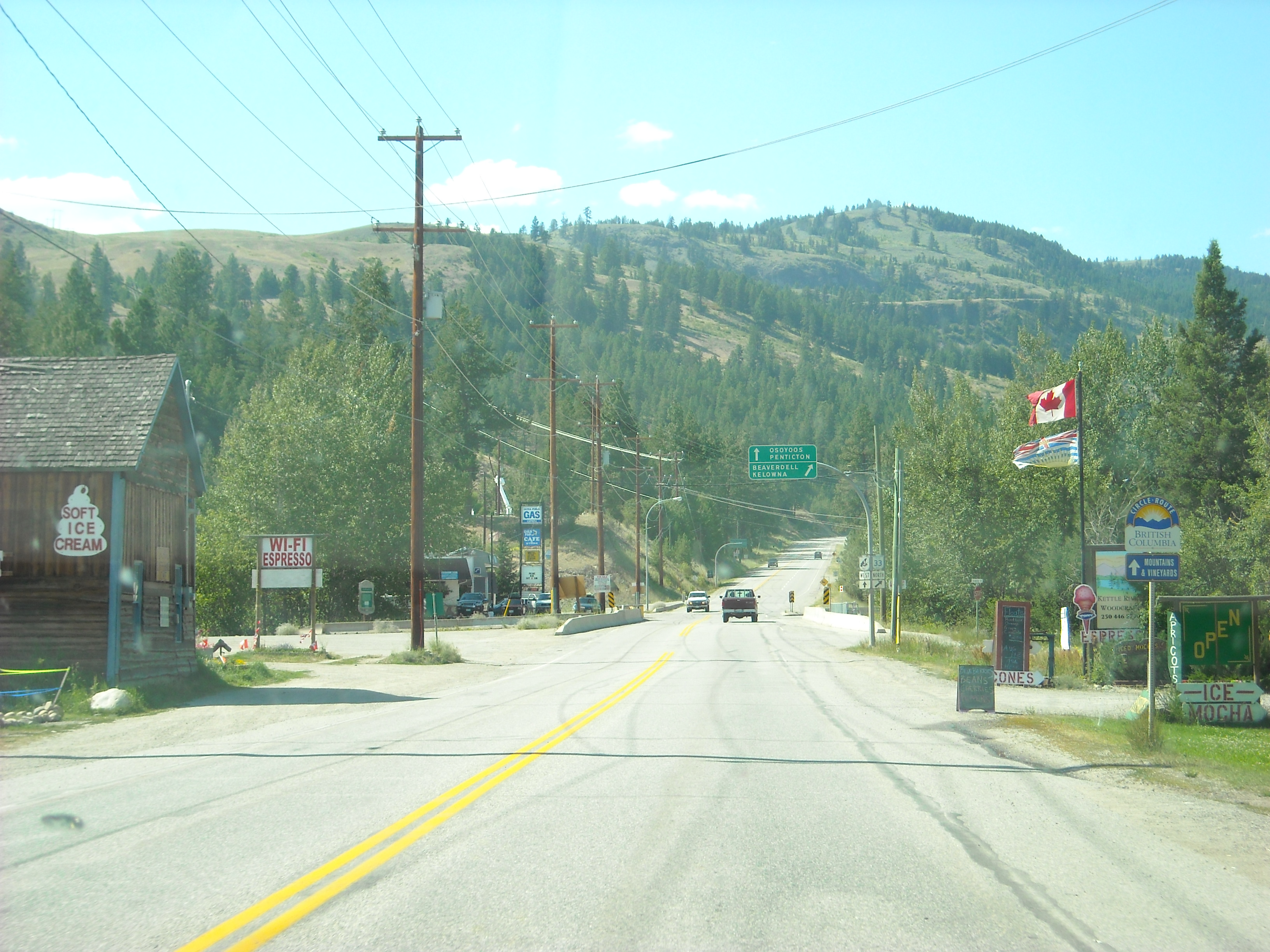
- The small community of Rock Creek & the bridge over its namesake creek in the middle of the image.

- Location of Rock Creek in British Columbia
- Coordinates: 49°03′26″N 119°00′00″W
- Country: Canada
- Province: British Columbia
- Region: Boundary Country
- Regional District: Kootenay Boundary
- Elevation: 603 m (1,978 ft)
- Area codes: 250, 778, 236, & 672
- Highways: Highway 3 Highway 33

Rock Creek is a settlement in the Boundary Country region of south central British Columbia. The unincorporated settlement is mostly on the southwest side of the Kettle River at the confluence with Rock Creek. The place lies at the junction of BC Highway 33 (about 135 kilometres (84 mi) south of Kelowna), and BC Highway 3 (about 32 kilometres (20 mi) west of Greenwood and 51 kilometres (32 mi) east of Osoyoos).

== Gold rush ==
In 1859, gold discovered along the creek (after which the community is named) triggered the placer mining of the Rock Creek Gold Rush. By the following year, many substantial log buildings housed stores and saloons that created the earliest community in the Boundary. However, the prospectors' tents were strung out along the creek beyond what is now Rock Creek Canyon Bridge (13 kilometres (8 mi) west), the most dramatic span on the Crowsnest Highway. To collect taxes on imports and royalties on exported gold, William George Cox was appointed gold commissioner and customs agent, and instructed to proceed to Rock Creek. In the interim, John Carmichael Haynes, his deputy, arrived in October 1860 to establish the first customs post outside the colonial capital of New Westminster.

== Gold bust ==
A reliable road from the coast was needed. At the time, the Dewdney Trail reached as far the Similkameen Valley. In January 1861, Dewdney and Moberly won the £300/mile contract to extend their pack trail to Rock Creek. By the time they entered their destination that August, the boom was over, the prospectors gone, and most of the 23 permanent buildings abandoned. In March 1862, Cox was re-assigned to the Cariboo district and Haynes proceeded to close down the offices.

In 1886 and 1900, high-pressure hoses were used for a few years to dislodge gold, but neither attempt proved profitable. Only four lots sold of a government townsite surveyed to the east in 1898. The Madge family operated a hotel from 1898.

== Railway era ==
The westward construction of the Vancouver, Victoria and Eastern Railway (VV& E), which followed Myers Creek a couple of miles south during 1905, offered no benefit to the settlement. In 1911, the westward advance of the Kettle Valley Railway passed on the northeast side of the river. A bridge soon connected to the station that was 4.7 kilometres (2.9 mi) west of Kettle Valley, and 11.6 kilometres (7.2 mi) south of Zamora. The final passenger train ran in 1964. The line westward closed to all traffic in 1973, and eastward in 1979.

Train Timetables (Regular stop or Flag stop)
Year	1926	1929	1932	1935	1939	1943	1948	1954	1955	1961
Ref.										
Type	Regular	Regular	Regular	Regular	Regular	Regular	Regular	Regular	Regular	Flag

== Lode mining & quarrying ==
Immediately adjacent to the lower few kilometres of Highway 33 were the Riverside and Imperial Mines, where claims began in the late 1890s. The latter were last worked for their gold and silver ores in 1926. During the 1970s much of the area was prospected for Uranium with no apparent success. A joint venture between Rock Creek Resources and Silver Falls Resources surveyed these sites in 1988, noting the presence of greenstone and copper.

Since 1972, several operators have quarried dolomite for crushing into sparkling white gravel for agricultural, landscaping and decorative purposes.

== Commerce ==
Businesses comprise a café, two gas stations, a hotel, a motel, two souvenir shops and a campground. The hotel vies with the Leland Hotel in Nakusp for the title of the oldest operating hostelry in BC. The small settlement remains important as a regional service centre for the farming and mining communities of the Boundary Country and the Monashee Country, which lies northward. It is the effective base town for Mount Baldy Ski Area, which lies to its northwest and overlooks the Okanagan Valley town of Oliver.

== Riverside ==
Riverside existed a mile away, but it is unclear when that community maintained a separate identity. By 1960, nearly all the buildings were gone.

== Television ==
Rock Creek was featured on the historical television documentary series Gold Trails and Ghost Towns, Season 3, Episode 8.

== See also ==
- Anarchist Mountain
- Beaverdell
- Greenwood, British Columbia
- Midway, British Columbia
- Camp McKinney, British Columbia
- Johnstone Creek Provincial Park
