= West Kettle River =

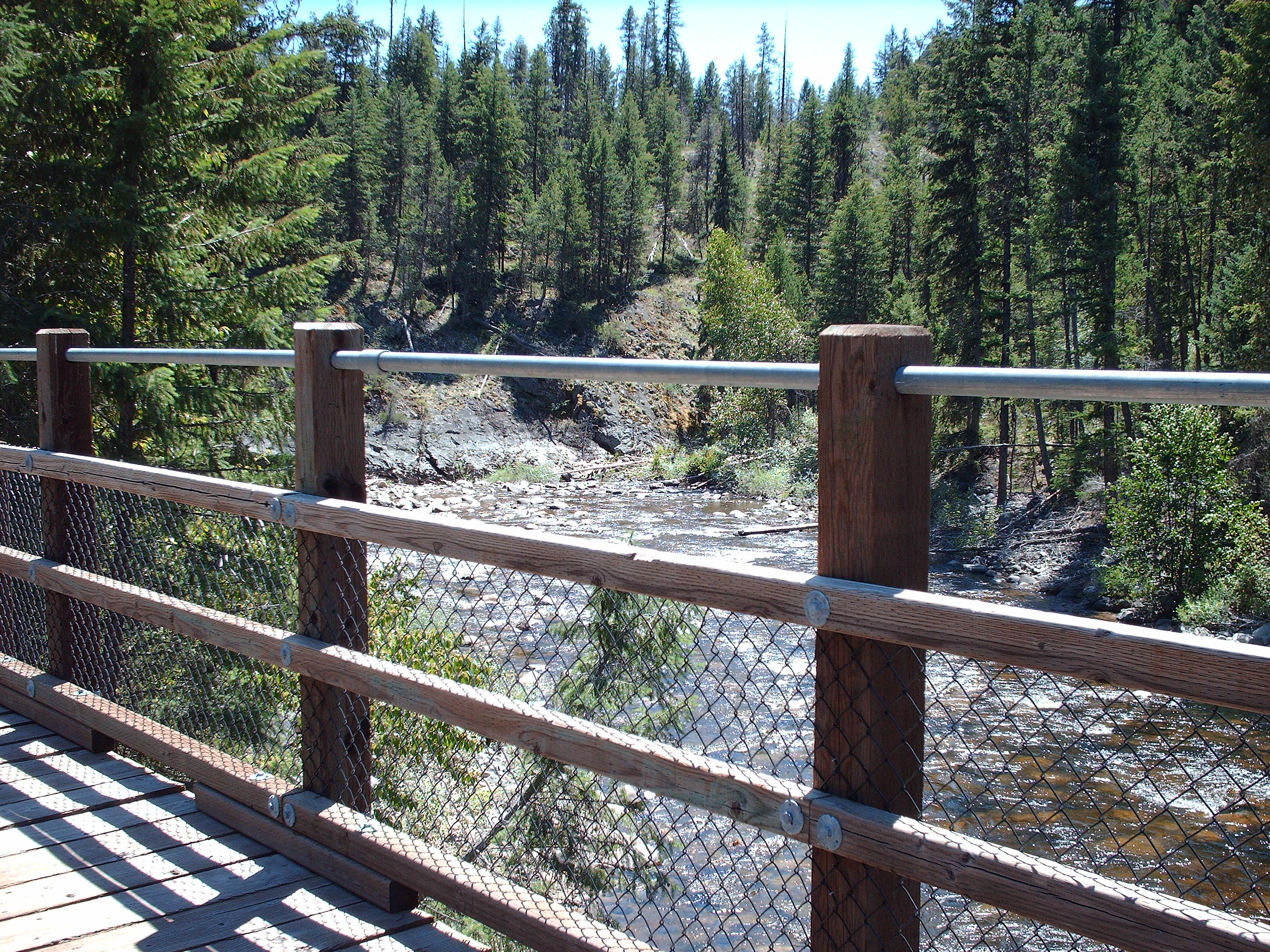
- West Kettle River as seen from the Kettle Valley Rail Trail

Location
- Country: Canada
- Province: British Columbia
- Land District: Similkameen Division Yale

Physical characteristics
- Source: St Margaret Lake
  - location: North of Big White Ski Resort
  - coordinates: 49°56′56″N 118°50′57″W
  - elevation: 1,974 m (6,476 ft)
- Mouth: Kettle River
  - location: Westbridge
  - coordinates: 49°09′58″N 118°58′22″W
  - elevation: 625 m (2,051 ft)
- Discharge
  - location: At Westbridge
  - average: 9.24 m^{3}/s (326 cu ft/s)
  - minimum: 0.991 m^{3}/s (35.0 cu ft/s)
  - maximum: 198 m^{3}/s (7,000 cu ft/s)

The West Kettle River is a tributary of the Kettle River in the Canadian province of British Columbia. It is part of the Columbia River basin, as the Kettle River is a tributary of the Columbia River.

== Course ==
The West Kettle River originates in St Margaret Lake the mountains east of Kelowna, near Jubilee Mountain. The river flows generally south, joining the Kettle River near the community of Westbridge.

== See also ==
- List of rivers of British Columbia
- Tributaries of the Columbia River
