= British Columbia Highway 33 =

Highway in British Columbia

Highway 33
- Rock Creek – Kelowna Highway

Route information
- Maintained by the Ministry of Transportation and Infrastructure
- Length: 129 km (80 mi)
- Existed: 1970–present

Major junctions
- North end: Enterprise Way in Kelowna
- Highway 97 in Kelowna
- South end: Highway 3 in Rock Creek

Location
- Country: Canada
- Province: British Columbia

Highway system
- British Columbia provincial highways
← Highway 31A	→ Highway 35

Highway 33 is a minor two- to four-lane highway connecting the Boundary Country and Okanagan regions of British Columbia, Canada. Highway 33, which is 129 km (80 mi) long, connects Rock Creek, on the Crowsnest Highway (Highway 3), north to Kelowna, on the Okanagan Highway, partially following the West Kettle River. It is also the main access to the Big White Ski Resort, which is near the apex of the pass between the head of the West Kettle and metropolitan Kelowna. The only other visible community on Highway 33 is Beaverdell, 48 km (30 mi) north of Rock Creek. Highway 33 opened in 1970.

== Major intersections ==
Regional District	Location	km	mi	Destinations	Notes
Kootenay Boundary	Rock Creek	0.00	0.00	Highway 3 (Crowsnest Highway) – Greenwood, Grand Forks, Osoyoos, Penticton	Southern terminus
Kootenay Boundary–Central Okanagan boundary		94.18	58.52	Kelowna – Rock Creek Summit — 1,265 m (4,150 ft)	
Central Okanagan		95.87	59.57	Big White Road – Big White Ski Resort	
Central Okanagan	Kelowna	128.82	80.05	Highway 97 – Penticton, City Centre, Vernon	Highway 33 is maintained by the City of Kelowna west of Highway 97
Central Okanagan	Kelowna	129.17	80.26	Enterprise Way	Northern terminus
1.000 mi = 1.609 km; 1.000 km = 0.621 mi

== See also ==
- Kettle Valley Railway
