= Rock Creek (British Columbia) =

Coordinates: 49°3′30″N 118°59′51″W

Rock Creek is a creek in the Boundary Country region of British Columbia. This creek is the most renowned placer gold creek in the Boundary Country. It was discovered in 1859 by a Canadian named Adam Beam. Rock Creek was originally called York Creek. Beam earned $977 in the first six weeks he worked on the creek. It has been estimated that over $250,000 in placer gold was recovered from this creek. The creek contained two types of gold. One was lemon yellow and the other coppery gold. The largest nugget recovered from Rock Creek was valued at $150. The creek was worked extensively from 1860 to 1864 with 500 miners on its banks. Rock Creek was worked again in the 1890s and 1930s. It was mined by both Europeans and Chinese. It was a rich creek for miles of its length. Rock Creek is in the traditional territory of Sinixt people.
